= List of medieval composers =

Medieval music generally refers the Western classical music from approximately the late 8th to early 15th centuries during the Middle Ages. Although Western plainsong originates earlier, and the first Christian music dates to Late Antiquity, the earliest surviving manuscripts date from the Carolingian Empire (800–887). The first and longest major era of Western classical music, medieval music includes composers of a variety of styles, often centered around a particular abbey or composition school. The lives of most medieval composers are generally little known, and some are so obscure that the only information available is what can be inferred from the contents and circumstances of their surviving music. (Note: Adémar de Chabannes and Guillaume de Machaut are among the few medieval composers whose lives are substantially documented.)

Composers of the Early Middle Ages (500–1000) almost exclusively concerned themselves with sacred music, writing in forms such as antiphons, hymns, masses, offices, sequences and tropes. Most composers were anonymous and the few whose names are known were monks or clergy. Of the known composers, the most significant are those from the Abbey of Saint Gall school, particularly Notker the Stammerer (Notker Balbulus); the Saint Martial school and its most prominent member, Adémar de Chabannes; and Wipo of Burgundy, to whom the well-known sequence "Victimae paschali laudes" is usually attributed.

In the High Middle Ages (1000–1250) sequences reached their peak with Adam of Saint Victor. By the late 11th century, the poet-composer troubadours of southern France became the first proponents of secular music to use musical notation; (Note: For a complete list see List of troubadours and trobairitz. As to not overwhelm this list with Troubadours, only those that Grove Music Online designates as the "principal troubadours" are included: Aimeric de Peguilhan, Arnaut Daniel, Arnaut de Mareuil, Bernart de Ventadorn, Bertran de Born, Cerveri de Girona, Folquet de Marselha, Gaucelm Faidit, Giraut de Bornelh, Guiraut Riquier, Jaufre Rudel, Marcabru, Peire d'Alvernhe, Peire Cardenal, Peire Vidal, Peirol, Raimbaut d'Aurenga, Raimbaut de Vaqeiras, Raimon de Miraval, Sordello and William IX, Duke of Aquitaine. In addition, for Trobaritzs, only what Grove identifies as "the most celebrated figures", are listed: Comtessa de Dia and Castelloza.) equivalent movements arose in the mid-12th century, with the Minnesang in Germany, trovadorismo in Galicia and Portugal, and the trouvères in northern France. (Note: For a complete list see Trouvère#List of trouvères. As to not overwhelm this list with Trouvère, only those that Grove Music Online designates as "important trouvères" are listed.) Principal exponents of these traditions include troubadours Arnaut Daniel, Bertran de Born, Bernart de Ventadorn, William IX, Duke of Aquitaine; Minnesänger Gottfried von Strassburg, Hartmann von Aue, Reinmar von Hagenau and Walther von der Vogelweide; and trouvère Adam de la Halle, Blondel de Nesle and Chrétien de Troyes. Simultaneous with the spur of secular activity, Léonin and Pérotin of the religious Notre-Dame school (part of the broader Ars antiqua) developed polyphony in forms such as the clausula, conductus and organum. The nun Hildegard of Bingen was also a prolific sacred composer of this time.

During the Late Middle Ages (1250–1500) the age of secular national schools gradually faded away, in part due to the Albigensian Crusade. In France, the troubadours, trouvère and ars antiqua music was succeeded by the ars nova led by Philippe de Vitry and Guillaume de Machaut. The music of the Trecento in Italy led by Francesco Landini is sometimes considered part of the ars nova style, but by the mid-14th century the movements had become too independent to warrant such a grouping. Part of this divergence was from the death of Machaut, where—after a brief continuance of the Ars nova style through the post-Machaut generation of F. Andrieu, Grimace, Jehan Vaillant and P. des Molins—there was a new rhythmically-complex style now known as ars subtilior. The major figures of ars subtilior included both composers from France and Italy; particularly Johannes Ciconia and Solage.

== Medieval composers ==
Medieval composers
Name	Lifetime	Origin	Musical school	Works	Ref(s)
The Western Roman Empire falls in 476, ushering in the Middle Ages; the oldest manuscripts survive from the Carolingian Empire (800–887).
Notker the Stammerer; Latin: Notker Balbulus also known as Notker I	c. 840 – 912	Frankish	Abbey of Saint Gall	Three works All sequences (attributions uncertain)	
Tuotilo	c. 850 – 915	Frankish	Abbey of Saint Gall	Five works All Tropes	
Stephen of Liège	c. 850 – 920	Frankish	–	Three works All Proper Offices to saints	
Hucbald; Latin: Hucbaldus	c. 850 – 930	Frankish	–	No surviving work Five works recorded	
Odo of Cluny	c. 878 – 942	French	–	15 works 3 hymns and 12 antiphons (?)	
Heriger of Lobbes also known simply as Herigerus	c. 925 – 1007	Frankish	–	No surviving work Four works recorded	
Odo of Arezzo also known as Abbot Oddo	late 10th century	Italian	–	Four works antiphons from a tonary	
Fulbert of Chartres	c. 960 – 1028	French	–	Three chants	
William of Volpiano also known as William of Dijon	962 – 1031	Italian	–	One work? Office of St Benignus	
Notker Physicus also known as Notker II	d. 975	Frankish	Abbey of Saint Gall	Two works One office and hymn	
Adémar de Chabannes	c. 988/9 – 1034	French	Saint Martial school	Two works (?); One office and mass	
Wulfstan the Cantor also known as Wulfstan of Winchester	fl. 992–6	English	–	Seven works Five hymns, two introits (attributions uncertain)	
Wipo of Burgundy also known simply as Wipo	c. 995 – c. 1050	Frankish? (Arles/ Burgundy)	–	One sequence Victimae paschali laudes (attribution uncertain)	
Arnold of Saint Emmeram	c. 1000 – 1050	Benedictine	Saint Emmeram's Abbey	60 works; over 40 antiphons and 20 responsories	
Otloh of Saint Emmeram	c. 1010–1070	Benedictine	Saint Emmeram's Abbey	Exultemus in ista fratres, Kyrie O pater immense and chants	
Hermann of Reichenau; Latin: Hermannus Contractus	1013–1054	German	–	Two works	
Berno of Reichenau	before 1014 – 1048	German	–	Two works, attribution uncertain	
The East–West Schism in 1054 separates the Catholic Church and the Eastern Orthodox Church
Godric	c. 1069 – 1170	English	–	Three songs	
Adam of Saint Victor	c. 1068 – 1146	French	–	Four works	
William IX, Duke of Aquitaine (Guilhem de Peitieus; Guillaume d'Aquitaine)	1071–1126	Occitan	Troubadour	One work; 11 poems total	
Peter Abelard	1079–1142	French	–	Various chants, a hymn, three sequences and seven laments	
Uodalscalc of Maisach	died in 1149 or 1151	German	–	Offices for St Ulrich and for St Conrad	
Hildegard of Bingen	1098–1179	German	–	72 works	
Jerusalem falls in 1099, during the First Crusade
Jaufre Rudel	fl. 1120–47	Occitan	Troubadour	Four works; six poems total	
Marcabru	fl. c. 1129–c1150	Occitan	Troubadour	Four works; 42 poems total	
Archpoet (Archipoeta)	c. 1130 – c. 1165	Western European probably French or German	Goliard	10 medieval Latin poems	
Bernart de Ventadorn	c. 1130–40 – c. 1190–1200	Occitan	Troubadour	19 (1 fragmentary) works; 45 poems total	
Giraut de Bornelh	c. 1140 – c. 1200	Occitan	Troubadour	Four works; 77 poems total	
Heinrich von Veldeke	1140–1150 – c. 1190	German	Minnesänger	No surviving works; 61 poems total	
"Vidame de Chartres" (probably Guillaume de Ferrières)	c. 1145–1155 – 1204	French	Trouvère	Six (nine?) works	
Albertus Parisiensis	fl. 1146–1177	French	–	Congaudeant catholici	
Peire d'Alvernha	fl. 1149–70	Occitan	Troubadour	Two works; 24 poems total	
Dietmar von Aist	fl. mid-to-late 12th century	German	Minnesänger	No surviving music	
Friedrich von Hûsen (Friedrich von Hausen)	c. 1150 – 1190	German	Minnesänger	No music survives; 53 strophes	
Rudolf von Neuenburg	c. 1150 – 30 August 1196	Swiss	Minnesänger		
Léonin	fl. 1150s – c. 1201	French	Notre-Dame school (Ars antiqua)		
Bertran de Born	1150 – before 1215	Occitan	Troubadour	1 work; 40 poems total	
Gaucelm Faidit	c. 1150 – c. 1220	Occitan	Troubadour	14 works; 68 poems total	
Arnaut Daniel	c. 1150–60 – c. 1200	Occitan	Troubadour	Two works; 18 poems total	
Raimbaut de Vaqueiras	c. 1150–60 – 1207	Occitan	Troubadour	Seven works; 35 poems total	
Folquet de Marselha (Folquet de Marseille)	c. 1150–60 – 1231	Occitan	Troubadour	13 works; 29 poems total	
Chrétien de Troyes	fl. c. 1160 – 1191	French	Trouvère		
Conon de Béthune	c. 1160 – 1219 /20	French	Trouvère	Seven works; eight poems total	
Der von Kürenberg	fl. 1160	German	Minnesänger		
Hartmann von Aue	c. 1160–1165 – after 1210	German	Minnesänger		
Gace Brule	c. 1160 – after 1213	French	Trouvère		
Peirol	c. 1160 – after 1221	Occitan	Troubadour	17 works; 34 poems total	
Philippe le Chancelier	c. 1160 – 1236	French	Notre-Dame school (Ars antiqua)		
Raimbaut d'Aurenga	fl. 1162–73	Occitan	Troubadour		
Chastelain de Couci	c. 1165 – 1203	French	Trouvère	–	
Gautier de Dargies	c. 1165 – after 1236	French	Trouvère		
Arnaut de Mareuil	fl. c. 1170–1200	Occitan	Troubadour		
Walther von der Vogelweide	c. 1170 – c. 1230	German	Minnesänger		
Aimeric de Peguilhan	c. 1175 – c. 1230	Occitan	Troubadour	Six works; 50 poems total	
Gautier de Coincy	1177/8 – 1236	French	Trouvère	Eight surviving poems with music	
Blondel de Nesle	fl. 1180–1200	French	Trouvère		
Peire Cardenal	1180–1278	Occitan	Troubadour	Three works; 90 poems total	
Peire Vidal	fl. c. 1183 – c. 1205	Occitan	Troubadour	12 works; 50 poems total	
Raimon de Miraval	fl. 1185–1229	Occitan	Troubadour	22 works; 48 poems total	
Reinmar von Hagenau (Reinmar der Alte)	fl. 1185–1205 – c. 1205	German	Minnesänger		
Audefroi le Bastart	fl. 1190–1230	French	Trouvère		
Comtessa de Dia (Beatriz de Dia)	fl. late 12th/early 13th century	Occitan	Trobairitz		
Neidhart von Reuental	c. 1190 – after 1236	German	Minnesänger		
Guillaume le Vinier	c. 1190 – 1245	French	Trouvère		
Pérotin (Perotinus)	fl. c. 1200	French	Notre-Dame school (Ars antiqua)		
Albrecht von Johansdorf	c. 1180 – c. 1209	German	Minnesänger		
Colin Muset	fl. 1200–50	French	Trouvère	12 works; seven with surviving music	
Jehan Erart	1200–10 – 1258/9	French	Trouvère		
Reinmar von Zweter	c. 1200 – c. 1260	German	Minnesänger	–	
Wincenty of Kielcza	c. 1200 – after 1262	Polish	–		
Castelloza	fl. early 13th century	Occitan	Trobairitz	No surviving music; three poems	
Jehan Bretel	c. 1210 – 1272	French	Trouvère		
Raoul de Soissons	1210–1215 – 1270	French	Trouvère		
Moniot d'Arras	fl. 1213–39	French	Trouvère		
Guiot de Dijon	fl. 1215–25	French	Trouvère	Four works; 17 poems total	
Gontier de Soignies	fl. before 1220	French	Trouvère		
Heinrich von Morungen	d. 1222	German	Minnesänger	33 Minnelieder survive, only one with melody.	
Sordello	c. 1200 — before 1269	Italian	Troubadour		
Gautier d'Épinal	before 1220 – before 1272	French	Trouvère		
Konrad von Würzburg	c. 1230 – 1287	German	Minnesänger	23 songs	
Guiraut Riquier	c. 1230 – c. 1300	Occitan	Troubadour	48 works; 49 poems total	
Martin Codax	fl. c. 1240–70	Galician	Galician-Portuguese lyric	Six songs; one known to be lost	
Adam de la Halle	1245–50 – 1285–8/after 1306	French	Trouvère	78 works	
Tannhäuser	fl. mid 13th-century	German	Minnesänger		
Cerverí de Girona	fl. 1259–1285	Catalan	Troubadour	No music survives; 114 lyric poems	
Heinrich Frauenlob	c. 1260 – 29 November 1318	German	Minnesänger		
Der wilde Alexander (Meister Alexander)	fl. mid-to-late 13th-century	German	Minnesänger	27 works; 24 Spruch strophes, two Minnelieder and one Leich	
Petrus de Cruce	fl. c. 1290	French	Ars antiqua		
W. de Wycombe	fl. late 13th century	English	–		
Philippe de Vitry	1291–1361	French	Ars nova	13 works at least	
Casella	died before 1300	Italian	–	No surviving works	
Jehan de Lescurel	fl. early 14th century	French	Ars nova	34 works; all monophonic except one	
Guillaume de Machaut	c. 1300 – 1377	French	Ars nova	143 works	
Marchetto da Padova	fl. 1305–19	Italian	Trecento	–	
Gherardello da Firenze	c. 1320–1325 – 1362/1363	Italian	Trecento	18 works	
Francesco Landini	c. 1325 – 1397	Italian	Trecento		
Lorenzo da Firenze	c. 1325 – 1372/1373	Italian	Trecento	21 works	
The Hundred Years' War conflict between England and France begins in 1337
Johannes Alanus	fl. late 14th or early 15th centuries	English	English ars nova	Sub Arturo plebs, and maybe four others	
Maestro Piero	fl. 1340–1350	Italian	Trecento	Eight works	
Giovanni da Cascia	fl. 1340–1350	Italian	Trecento	19 works	
Jacopo da Bologna	fl. 1340–1386	Italian	Trecento	34 works	
Vincenzo da Rimini	fl. 1350 fl. mid-14th century	Italian	Trecento	Four madrigals and two Cacce	
Bartolino da Padova	fl. c. 1365 – after 1405	Italian	Trecento		
Matheus de Sancto Johanne (Mayshuet de Joan)	died 1391	French	Ars subtilior		
Donato da Cascia	fl. mid-to-late 14th century	Italian	Trecento		
Magister Franciscus (Note: F. Andrieu and Magister Franciscus may be the same person; scholars identify them as the person with varying degrees of certainty: Reaney 2001a: Their works being from the same manuscript "suggest that the two composers may be the same person".; Abraham & Hughes 1991, p. 27: "Franciscus is doubtless the same man as the F. Andrieu..."; Reaney 1954, p. 67: "It would not be impossible for Magister Franciscus and F. Andrieu to be one and the same person"; Günther 2001a: "[Magister Franciscus] may be the F. Andrieu..."; Strohm 2005, p. 53: "[F. Andrieu] may be the same man as Magister Franciscus"; Magnan 1993, p. 49: "[On the identification between Andrieu and Franciscus] this tenuous identification leads nowhere.")	fl. 1370–80	French	Ars nova?	Two works; both three part ballades	
Philippus de Caserta	fl. c. 1370	Italian?	Ars subtilior	6 ballades	
Mönch von Salzburg (Monk of Salzburg)	fl. Late 14th century	German	–		
F. Andrieu	fl. c. 1377 – c. 1400	French	Ars nova	One work; a ballade for Machaut's death	
Johannes Symonis Hasprois	fl. 1378–1428	French	Ars subtilior		
Petrus de Goscalch	fl. c. 1385–1395	French?	Ars subtilior		
P. des Molins	fl. mid 14th century	French	Ars nova	Two works; among the most popular pieces of their time	
Niccolò da Perugia	fl. mid-to-late 14th century	Italian	Trecento		
Jehan Suzay	fl. c. 1380	French	Ars subtilior		
Trebor	fl. c. 1380 – c. 1400	French	Ars subtilior		
Jan of Jenštejn	1348 – 1400	Bohemian	–	40 works	
Antonio Zacara da Teramo	c. 1350–1360 — after 1413	Italian	Trecento	Very prolific in a variety of genres	
Andrea da Firenze	fl. c. 1375 – c. 1415	Italian	Trecento	–	
Paolo da Firenze	c. 1355 – 1436	Italian	Trecento	Possibly up to 61 works	
Hugo von Montfort	1357 – 1423	German	Minnesänger		
Grazioso da Padova	fl. mid-to-late 14th century	Italian	Trecento	Mass movements, ballata	
Jehan Vaillant	fl. 1360–1390	French	Ars nova	Five (six?) works	
Giovanni Mazzuoli	c. 1360 – 1426	Italian	Trecento	Ballata	
Solage	fl. late 14th century	French	Ars subtilior		
Jacob Senleches	fl. 1382–1383	French	Ars subtilior		
Borlet (Note: He may be the same person as Trebor)	fl. c. 1397? – after 1409	French	Ars subtilior	One work; a four-voice virelai	
Johannes Ciconia	c. 1370 – 1412	Franco-Flemish	Trecento; Ars subtilior		
Leonel Power	c. 1370–1385 – 1445	English	Old Hall Manuscript	Mass movements and other Latin settings	
Johannes Tapissier	c. 1370 – before 1410	French	Burgundian School	Mass movements, motet	
Johannes Cuvelier	fl. c. 1372 – after 1387	French	Ars subtilior	Four works	
Guido	fl. c. 1372 – 1374	French	Ars subtilior	Three works in the Chantilly Codex	
Grimace	fl. mid-to-late 14th century	French	Ars nova	Five (Seven?) Works	
Antonello da Caserta	fl. Late 14th century	Italian	Trecento	Ballades, Rondeaux, Virelai, Ballatas	
Nicolas Grenon	c. 1375 – 1456	French	Burgundian School		
Oswald von Wolkenstein	c. 1376 – 1445	German		Lieder	
Pierre Fontaine	c. 1380–1450	French		Ballades, Rondeaux	
John Dunstaple (John Dunstable)	c. 1390 – 1453	English	Contenance angloise	Mass movements and isorhythmic motets	
Martinus Fabri	died in 1400	North Netherlandish			
Aleyn	fl. c. 1400	English	Old Hall Manuscript	Mass movements	
Egardus	fl. 1400	Flemish	Ars subtilior	3 works	
Queldryk	fl. c. 1400	English	Old Hall Manuscript	Mass movements	
Andrea Stefani	fl. c. 1400	Italian	Trecento	Ballate	
Thomas Fabri	fl. 1400–1415	Franco-Flemish			
Matteo da Perugia	fl. 1400–1416	Italian	Trecento		
Baude Cordier	fl. early 15th century	French	Ars subtilior		
Nicolaus Ricci de Nucella Campli	fl. 1401–1436	Italian	Trecento	Ballata	
Bartolomeo da Bologna	fl. c. 1405–1427	Italian	Trecento	Mass movements, ballate	
Jacobus Vide	fl. 1405–1433?	Franco-Flemish			
Johannes Cesaris	fl. 1406–1417	French		Motet, ballades, rondeaux	
Conradus de Pistoria	fl. Early 15th century	Italian	Ars subtilior	Ballades	
Roy Henry	fl. c. 1410	English	Old Hall Manuscript	Mass movements	
Pycard	fl. 1410	English	Old Hall Manuscript	Mass movements	
Byttering	fl. c. 1410–1420	English	Old Hall Manuscript	Mass movements	
Antonio da Cividale	fl. 1410–1421	Italian	Trecento	Mass movements, motets, ballades, rondeaux, virelais	
Richard Loqueville	died 1418	French		Mass movements, ballades, rondeaux	
Estienne Grossin	fl. 1418–1421	French		Numerous mass movements	
Hugo de Lantins	fl. 1420–1430	Flemish		Mass movements, motets, rondeaux	
Arnold de Lantins	died before 1432	Flemish		Mass movements, ballades, rondeaux	
Jefimija	1349 – 1405	Serbian		Composed tuzhbalice (laments)	
For later composers see the List of Renaissance composers
