= Jehan Vaillant =

14th-century medieval French composer and theorist

Jehan Vaillant (fl. 1360–1390; also spelled Johannes Vayllant) was a French composer and music theorist. He is named immediately after Guillaume de Machaut by the Règles de la seconde rhétorique, which describes him as a "master … who had a school of music in Paris". Besides five (possibly six) pieces of music surviving to his name, he was also the author of a treatise on tuning. With Grimace and F. Andrieu and P. des Molins, Vaillant was part of the post-Machaut generation whose music shows few distinctly ars subtilior features, leading scholars to recognize Vaillant's work as closer to the ars nova style of Machaut.

== Life and career ==
Vaillant's works are conserved in the Chantilly Manuscript, which is also the main source for the works of the Papal singers Matheus de Sancto Johanne, Johannes Symonis Hasprois and Johannes Haucourt. This connexion with the Papal group suggests to certain modern scholars that Vaillant may be the same person who entered the Papal chapel at Avignon as capellanus Johannes Valentis or Valhant on 26 November 1352, during the pontificate of Clement VI. This Vaillant died, still in Papal service, in 1361, probably of bubonic plague. The discovery by Israel Adler, the historian of Hebrew music theory, of an anonymous Hebrew treatise by a Parisian student of Vaillant's shows, in Adler's estimation, that the latter was lecturing the former late into the fourteenth century. A more likely identification of the composer would then be with one of several men with the same name who served John, Duke of Berry (r. 1360–1416), during the latter decades of the century. (Note: In 1377 there was a "clerk of the offices of the household" (clerc des offices de l'ostel), and in 1385 there is first mentioned a secretary (secretarius) who became the keeper of the duke's seal in 1387.) Léopold Delisle made yet a third suggestion: that the composer is the "Poitevin Jean Vaillant" who made an abrégé du roman de Brut—an abridged version of the Roman de Brut—in 1391.

== Music ==
Vaillant may have been "a younger contemporary of Machaut", but if, as the Chantilly Manuscript records, one of his rondeaux was copied in Paris in 1369, then he was "rhythmically in advance of Machaut’s style". This rondeau has two texts, Dame doucement and Doulz amis, while another has three, Tres doulz amis, Ma dame and Cent mille fois. Two of his rondeaux are monotextual: Pour ce que je ne say, which is isorhythmic and pedagogical, and Quiconques veut, a polymetric piece that is actually anonymous but sometimes ascribed to Vaillant. Of his works, only the ballade Onques Jacob is "fully in the style of Machaut".

Vaillant's Par maintes foys, a virelai with imitation bird-calls, was probably one of the most popular works of the time, certainly one of the most copied, surviving in nine sources, including versions with two voices, an added cantus, a Latin contrafactum and one with a German contrafactum by Oswald von Wolkenstein.

== Works ==
List of compositions by Vaillant
Title	Parts	Genre	Apel	Greene
Dame doucement/Doulz amis	3	Rondeau	A 225	G Vol 18
Onques Jacob	3	Ballade	A 220	G Vol 18
Par maintes foys	3	Virelai	A 222	G Vol 19
Pour ce que je ne say	2	Rondeau	A 227	G Vol 18
Tres doulz amis/Ma dame/Cent mille fois	3	Rondeau	A 229	G Vol 18
No other works by Vaillant survive

Uncertain authenticity
Title	Parts	Genre	Greene
Quiconques veut	3	Rondeau	G Vol 22

=== Editions ===
- Apel, Willi [in German] (1970–1972). French Secular Compositions of the Fourteenth Century. Corpus mensurabilis musicae 53. Vol. 1, Ascribed Compositions. Cambridge, Massachusetts: American Institute of Musicology. OCLC 311424615.
- Greene, Gordon K., ed. (1981–89). French Secular Music. Polyphonic Music of the Fourteenth Century. Vol. 18–19, 22. Monaco: Éditions de l'Oiseau-Lyre.

- Greene, Gordon K., ed. (1982). Manuscript Chantilly, Musée Condé 564 Part 1, nos. 1–50. Polyphonic Music of the Fourteenth Century. Vol. 18. Monaco: Éditions de l'Oiseau-Lyre. OCLC 181660103.
- Greene, Gordon K., ed. (1982). Manuscript Chantilly, Musée Condé 564 Part 2, nos. 51–100. Polyphonic Music of the Fourteenth Century. Vol. 19. Monaco: Éditions de l'Oiseau-Lyre. OCLC 181661945.
- Greene, Gordon K., ed. (1989). Rondeaux and Miscellaneous Pieces. Polyphonic Music of the Fourteenth Century. Vol. 22. Monaco: Éditions de l'Oiseau-Lyre. OCLC 19540959.
