= Solage =

French composer

Solage (fl. late 14th century; or Soulage), possibly Jean So(u)lage, was a French composer, and probably also a poet. He composed the most pieces in the Chantilly Codex, the principal source of music of the ars subtilior, the manneristic compositional school centered on Avignon at the end of the century.

== Life ==
Nothing is known about Solage's life, beyond what can be inferred from the texts to his music. Even his name is a puzzle. One possibility is that the single name "Solage" is a nickname or pseudonym, similar to others known from the period, such as Grimace or Hasprois. "Solage" and "soulage" are variant spellings of Old French solaz, solace, meaning "consolation", "joy", or "entertainment". In the refrain to the text of Calextone qui fut dame, the composer refers to himself with such a double meaning, using the spelling "soulage". However, the possibility that it is a genuine name cannot be ruled out. One of the attributions in the Chantilly Codex includes the initial J wrapped into the name, so it is possible his first name was Je(h)an. There are many references from that time to people called Jean Soulas (a name still found in modern times), and the surname Soulage or Soulages also existed (for example, Guillaume de Soulages, count of Canillac, documented from a wedding in 1392), though there are no clear candidates for the composer. Gilbert Reaney's suggestion that the composer's first name might have been Charles rested on a speculative identification of Solage with another composer found in the Chantilly Codex, Goscalch, "a rather German-sounding name" that might be an anagram of "Ch. Solag(e)". However, Reaney's claim that the name occurs nowhere apart from the Chantilly Codex has been proven wrong, as several other identifications have been found, and the possible identity of the two composers has been rejected.

Specific references in the texts of some of his songs indicate he probably was associated with the French royal court. The ballade S'aincy estoit glorifies Jean, duc de Berry, and was written to celebrate his second marriage, to Jeanne de Boulogne, which took place with great pomp near Avignon on 25 May 1389. The pair of ballades, Corps femenin par vertu de nature and Calextone qui fut dame also refer to Jeanne de Boulogne, and their texts show that the former was composed shortly before and the latter shortly after this wedding. Although it is tempting to suppose that Solage might have been in the service of the duke of Berry, it is just as likely that he was in the service of Gaston Fébus, compte de Foix, who had a considerable financial interest in this marriage.

There is also a possible connection to, or at least an indication of some cultural exchange with the court of Giangaleazzo Visconti, the Duke of Milan, in the text of Solage's virelai, Joieux de Cuer. The Visconti family motto, "'a bon droit", is prominently placed at the beginning of the ninth line, at the beginning of the reprise of the first musical section, and just before the return of the refrain. Although Giangaleazzo died in 1402, his daughter Valentina continued to employ the motto until her death in 1408. In his chanson Pluseurs gens Solage mentioned Jacqueline, the granddaughter of Philippe, Duke of Burgundy, who was born in 1401 and betrothed in 1403. The association with Jacqueline is conjectural, however, since the name actually found in Pluseurs gens is "Jaquete".

== Poetry ==
Because the texts of Solage's songs are found only in his musical settings, and because they show amongst them kindred turns of phrase as well as syntactic and lexical preferences that lend a sense of unity, it is probable that he wrote the words as well as the music. Other composers represented in the Chantilly Codex were also likely poet-composers, in particular Jacob Senleches.

One especially plain example of textual interrelationships concerns the two ballades Corps femenin and Calextone qui fut. The former is based on the acrostic CATHELLINE LA ROYNE DAMOURS, and the latter begins with what could be the same acrostic, CATHELLI ..., but the second and third stanzas of this ballade are not preserved. There are no other surviving examples of such twin ballades in the literature of this period.

== Music ==
MIDI sequence of Fumeux fume par fumee

Stylistically, Solage's works exhibit two distinctly different characters: a relatively simple one usually associated with his great predecessor and elder contemporary Guillaume de Machaut, and a more recherché one, complex in the areas of both pitch and rhythm, characteristic of the ars subtilior ("more subtle art"). These two styles mostly exist separately in different songs but sometimes are found mixed in a single composition, where they can be used to underscore the musical and poetic structure. In his simpler "Machaut" style pieces Solage nevertheless makes many personal choices that are very different from what Machaut typically does. Moreover, the simpler style is not necessarily an indication of an earlier date nor the complex style a reliable sign of a later date. Solage uses his techniques to link text and music together, either in terms of form or else of meaning. Nevertheless, some of his ars subtilior music was quite experimental: the best-known example in this complex style is his bizarre Fumeux fume par fumée (approx: "The smoky one smokes through [or for] smoke"), which is extravagantly chromatic for the time; it also contains some of the lowest tessitura vocal writing in any music of the period. (Note: Another rare example of low tessitura writing in this time can be found in Jacob Senleches's Fuions de ci.)

Solage's rondeau is associated with a putative literary school of fumeurs. There have been many interpretations of this sobriquet. Although it is tempting given the outré nature of some poems to suppose that it refers to the smoking of some drug, the simplest explanation in the case of the above work is that it was written for the Parisian Fumeurs, the Society of Smokers, "an eccentric literary clique of ostentatiously dressed bohemians that named themselves after Jean Fumeux and flourished in the 1360s and 1370s". One scholar suggests that Eustache Deschamps's poetry, which contains most of the surviving references to the fumeurs, was satirical. The literature associated with the Fumeurs is dated between 1366 and 1381, and Solage's ballade Plusieurs gens voy also alludes to them. In his Règles de la seconde rhétorique Deschamps claims to be the nephew of Machaut, and in his Ballade 447 states that Machaut "brought me up and did me many kindnesses". Though there is no independent verification of these claims, it seems likely that they must have been on close terms. On the other hand, if indeed the Fumeurs were literally devotees of smoking, since tobacco was not known in Europe for another two centuries, some other drug, e.g. hashish or opium, must have been implied. However, the current consensus among musicologists is that there was no physical smoking. In the Middle Ages, the French expression "avoir des fumées au cerveau" (having smoke in the brain) referred to mental confusion, a condition attributed to internal vapours which, according to ancient authorities such as Hippocrates and Aristotle, could be evacuated from "heated and smoky brains" either by sneezing or by drinking. Similarly, drinking in the morning was referred to as "abattre le brouillard"—"breaking up the fog".

== Works ==
All of Solage's known compositions are found in the Chantilly Codex, and only one of these is found anywhere else. This is the four-voiced ballade Pluseurs gens voy qui leur pensee, which was obviously copied from Chantilly into the important Florentine manuscript Florence, Bibl. Nazionale, Panciatichi 26, only without its text and lacking identification of its composer (Dulong 2009, p. 45; Reaney 1954, pp. 69, 76, 94). Only ten works are inscribed with Solage's name in the Chantilly Codex (one of them, Tres gentil cuer, is found there twice), but two more can be attributed to him on stylistic grounds. One of these, Le mont Aôn de Trace, is also found in the same Florence manuscript with Pluseurs gens voy. These twelve works consist of 9 ballades, 2 virelais and a rondeau:

- Le basile de sa propre nature (ballade, 4 voices, Ch no. 79)
- Calextone, qui fut dame d'Arouse (ballade, 3 voices, Ch no. 80)
- Corps femenin par vertu de nature (ballade, 3 voices, Ch no. 24)
- En l'amoureux vergier (ballade, 3 voices, Ch no. 17)
- Fumeux fume par fumée (rondeau, 3 voices, Ch no. 98)
- Hélas, je voy mon cuer (ballade, 4 voices, Ch no. 95)
- Joieux de cuer en seumellant estoye (virelai, 4 voices, Ch no. 97)
- Pluseurs gens voy qui leur pensee (ballade, 4 voices, Ch no. 96)
- S'aincy estoit que ne feust la noblesce (ballade, 3 voices, Ch no. 50)
- Tres gentil cuer (virelai, 3 voices, Ch no. 13 & 81)

Anonymous in the source, but attributable on stylistic grounds:

- Adieu vous di, tres doulce compaynie (ballade, 3 voices, Ch no. 74)
- Le mont Aôn de Trace, doulz païs (ballade, 3 voices, Ch no. 22)
- Toute clarté (ballade, 3voices, Ch no. 3)

All of Solage's works have been recorded by Gothic Voices on the Avie Records label and by ensemble Tetraktys on the Olive Music label.

== Recordings ==
- The Ars nova. Cappella Cordina, Alejandro Planchart, conductor. Music of the Middle Ages 9; LP recording 1 disc, 33⅓ rpm, 12 in., stereo; Musical Heritage Society MHS 899 (New York: Musical Heritage Society, 1969) (Rondeau: "Fumeux fume par fumée"). Also released on Expériences Anonymes EAS 83 ([New York]: Expériences Anonymes, 1969).
- The Art of Courtly Love; The Early Music Consort of London, David Munrow, dir.; LP recording, 3 discs, stereo; EMI/His Master's Voice SLS 863 (86301, 86302, 86303) (London: EMI Records Limited, 1973) (Ballade: "Helas! Je voy mon cuer"; Rondeau: "Fumeux fume par fumée"). French issue as Chansons d'amour courtois de Guillaume de Machaut à Guillaume Dufay; 3-LP set, La voix de son maître 2C16705410, 2C16705411, 2C16705412 (Paris: Pathé Marconi EMI, 1974).
- Beauté parfaite: L'automne du Moyen Âge: chansons des XIV^{e} et XV^{e} siècles; Alla Francesca; CD recording, 1 disc, stereo; Opus 111 OPS 30-173 (Paris: Opus 111, 1997) (Rondeau: "Fumeux fume par fumée").
- Cesena: Songs for Popes, Princes and Mercenaries, c. 1400. Graindelavoix, Björn Schmelzer, director. Recorded in Eglise de Franc-Waret, Belgium, August 2011. CD recording, 1 disc, stereo. Glossa Platinum GCD P32106 (San Lorenzo de El Escorial, Spain: Glossa Platinum, 2011) ("Corps femenin"; Rondeau: "Fumeux fume par fumée")
- Codex Chantilly: Airs de cour du XIV^{e} siècle; Ensemble Organum, Marcel Pérès, dir. Recorded September 1986; CD recording, 1 disc, stereo; Harmonia Mundi France HMC 901252 (Arles: Harmonia Mundi s. a., 1987) (Rondeau: "Fumeux fume par fumée").
- Codex Chantilly: en l'amoureux vergier. Ensemble de Caelis, Laurence Brisset, director; Recorded at Église Notre-Dame de Centeilles, Siran 13–16 April 2010; CD recording, 1 disc, stereo; Æon AECD 1099 (Paris: Æon, 2010) ("Corps femenin"; "Fumeux fume par fumée"; "Calextone qui fut"; "En l'amoureux vergier").
- Codex Chantilly. Vol. 1. Tetraktys: Jill Feldman, voice; Carlos Mena, voice; Marta Graziolino, harp; Silvia Tecardi, vielle; Kees Boeke, vielle, flute, and direction. Recorded at Pieve de San Pietro a Presciano, Arezzo 12–15 February 2097. CD recording, 1 disc, stereo. Et'cetera KTC 1900. ([Pergine Valdarno, Italy]: Olive Music; [Amsterdam]: Et'cetera, 2008) (Ballade: "S'aincy estoit que ne feust la noblesce").
- Codex Chantilly. Vol. 2. Tetraktys, Kees Boeke, director. Recorded at Pieve de San Pietro a Presciano, Arezzo 23–25 January and 2–4 May 2010. CD recording, 1 disc, stereo. Olive Music KTC 1905 ([Pergine Valdarno, Italy]: Olive Music; [Amsterdam]: Et'cetera, 2011) (Ballade: "En l'amoureux vergier"; Virelai: "Tres gentil cuer").
- Codex Chantilly. Vol. 4 - Solage: Complete Works. Tetraktys, Kees Boeke, director. Zsuzsi Tóth, Georgia Burashko, Jill Feldman, Carlos Mena: chant; Jasper Snow, Fred Thomas, Kees Boeke, Silvia Tecardi, Baptiste Romain: vielle; Cristina Greco, Claire Piganiol, Kirsty Whatley: harp; Fred Thomas: citole and psalterium; Kees Boeke, fluste. Recorded at Pieve de San Pietro a Presciano, Arezzo 25-30 May 2025. CD recording, 2 discs, stereo. Olive Music OM 016 ([Pergine Valdarno, Italy]: Olive Music; [Dordrecht]) ("Adieu vous di"; "S'aincy estoit"; "Calextone"; "Fumeux Fume"; "Treès gentil cuer"; "Bien dire et sagement parler"; "Corps feminin"; "Toute clarté"; "Joieux de cuer"; "Le mont Aön"; "Pluseurs gens voy"; "En l'amoureux vergier"; "Hélas je voy mon cuer"; "Le basile").
- Corps femenin: l'avant-garde de Jean Duc de Berry. Ferrara Ensemble, Crawford Young, director. Recorded at Chiesa di St. Germanus, Seewen, Switzerland, 22–25 March 2000, 7 December 2008, and 16 February 2009. CD recording, 1 disc, stereo; Arcana A 355 ([Omegna (VB), Italy]: Arcana, 2010) ("Corps femenin"; "Calextone qui fut").
- Febus Avant! Music at the Court of Gaston Febus (1331–1391); Huelgas Ensemble, Paul Van Nevel; Recorded in the Chapel of the Irish College, Leuven, Belgium, 25–28 October 1991; CD recording, 1 disc, stereo; Vivarte Sony Classical SK 48195 ([Germany]: Sony Classical GmbH, 1992) (#6: Rondeau: "Fumeux fume par fumée").
- Fleurs de vertus: chansons subtiles à la fin du XIVe siècle; Ferrara Ensemble, Crawford Young, director. Recorded at l'Église S. Germanus de Seewen (Soleure), 8–11 January 1996; CD recording, 1 disc, stereo. Arcana A 40 ([France]: Arcana, 1996) ("S'aincy estoit que ne feust la noblesce"; Virelai: "Tres gentil cuer").
- French Music of the Gothic Era; Deller Consort, Alfred Deller, director; Concentus Musicus, Wien; with ensemble of ancient instruments. LP recording, 1 disc, 33⅓ rpm, 12 in., stereo; Bach Guild BGS-70656 (New York: Bach Guild, 1964) ("Pluseurs gens voy";"Helas je voy")
- A Golden Treasury of Mediæval Music; Sine Nomine Ensemble for Medieval Music. Recorded at Valley Recordings, Littleton-on-Severn, July 1995. CD recording, 1 disc, stereo. Amon Ra CD-SAR-63 (Wotton-under-Edge, Gloucestershire: Amon Ra, 1996) ("Corps femenin"). Reissued, CD recording, Musical Heritage Society 15230M (Oakhurst, NJ: Musical Heritage Society, 1998).
- Guillaume Dufay und seine Zeit; Syntagma Musicum, Kees Otten, director; Alte Werk; LP recording, 2 discs, 33⅓ rpm, 12 in.; Telefunken 6.35257 ([Germany]: Telefunken, 1974) (Rondeau: "Fumeux fume par fumee")
- Johannes Ciconia and His Time; Little Consort, Kees Boeke, director; Recorded in the Cattedrale SS Pietro e Paolo, Sovana, Italy, June 1988; CD recording, 1 disc, stereo; Channel Classics CCS 0290 (Amsterdam, Holland: Channel Classics, 1990) ("Hélas, je voy").
- Lancaster and Valois – French and English Music 1350–1420; Gothic Voices, Christopher Page (dir.); Recorded in Boxgrove Priory, Chichester, 11–13 December 1991; CD recording, 1 disc, stereo; Hyperion CDA66588 (London: Hyperion Records Limited, 1992). (Virelai: "Tres gentil cuer")
- Masters, Monsters & Mazes: Treading the Medieval Labyrinth. Trefoil. Recorded at Martel Recital Hall, Vassar College, Poughkeepsie, NY, 4–5 June 2005; CD recording, 1 disc, stereo. MSR Classics MS 1095 (Elmsford, NY: MSR Classics, 2005) (Ballade: "Le basile").
- Medée fu: ballades e ballate: música francesa e italiana de finales del siglo XIV. Tritonus XIV. Recorded Madrid, May 2001. CD recording, 1 disc, stereo. Verso VRS 2005 (Madrid: Verso, 2001) (Rondeau: "Fumeux fume par fumée")
- The Medieval Romantics – French Songs and Motets 1340–1440; Gothic Voices, Christopher Page (dir.); Recorded in the Hospital of St Cross, Winchester, 3–5 October 1990 and 14 May 1991; CD recording, 1 disc, stereo; Hyperion CDA66463 (London: Hyperion Records Limited, 1991). (Virelai: "Joieux de cuer en seumellant estoye")
- Music of the Hundred Years War. Musica Reservata, John Beckett, director. LP recording, 1 disc, 33⅓ rpm, 12 in.. stereo, [(S.l.]: Philips, 1968) ("S'aincy estoit que ne feust la noblesce").
- The Passion of Reason: The Sour Cream Legacy; Sour Cream; Recorded June 1993 and July 1994; CD recording, 2 discs, stereo; Glossa GCD 921102 ([n.p.]: Glossa Music SL, 1997) (Rondeau: "Fumeux fume par fumée").
- Project Ars Nova: Ars Magis Subtiliter: Secular Music of the Chantilly Codex; Ensemble P. A. N.; Recorded at Wellesley Chapel, Wellesley, MA, 20–22 July 1987; CD recording, 1 disc, stereo; New Albion Records NA 021 CD (San Francisco: New Albon Records, Inc., 1989) (Rondeau: "Fumeux fume par fumée")
- The Study of Love – French Songs and Motets of the 14th Century; Gothic Voices, Christopher Page (dir.); Recorded in Boxgrove Priory, West Sussex, 29 and 30 April, and 1 May 1992; CD recording, 1 disc, stereo; Hyperion CDA66619 (London: Hyperion Records Limited, 1992). (Ballade: "Le basile")
- Très gentil cuer: Höfische Musik des späten Mittelalters. Fortuna Canta. Recorded at the Rolf-Liebermann-Studio, NDR, Hamburg, 9–10 January 2003. CD recording, 1 disc, stereo. Ars Produktion ARS 38 489 ([Ratingen]: Ars Produktion, 2009) ("Tres gentil cuer").
- The Unknown Lover – Songs by Solage and Machaut; Gothic Voices; Recorded St. Andrew's Church, Toddington, Gloucestershire, England 20–22 February 2006; CD recording, 1 disc, stereo; AVIE AV2089 ([London]: Avie Records, 2006) (#1, 3, 5, 6, 7, 11, 12, 13, 17, 19: Ballade: "Le basile", "Calextone qui fut", "Corps femenin", "En l'amoureux vergier", Rondeau: "Fumeux fume par fumée", "Hélas je voy", "Joieux de cuer", "Pluseurs gens voy", "S'aincy estoit". "Tres gentil cuer", and two anonymous pieces, possibly by Solage as well).
- Zodiac – Ars Nova and Ars Subtilior in the Low Countries and Europe; Capilla Flamenca. Eufoda 1360 (2004).

== Sources ==
- Anon. n.d. Solage (Late 14th Century) WBAI Radio "Here of a Sunday Morning" website (Accessed 22 February 2014).
- Boeke, Kees and Jos Haring. 2024. "The Works of Solage - New Edition with Commentary. Olive Music Editions OME 006. Arezzo/Dordrecht.
- Dulong, Gilles. 2009. "En relisant Solage". In A Late Medieval Songbook and Its Context: New Perspectives on the Chantilly Codex (Bibliothèque du Château de Chantilly, Ms. 564), edited by Yolanda Plumley and Anne Stone, 45–61. Collection "Epitome musical". Turnhout: Brepols. ISBN 9782503515984 (pbk).
- Gombosi, Otto. 1950. "French Secular Music of the Fourteenth Century Edited by Willi Apel" (Review). The Musical Quarterly 36, no. 4 (October): 603–10.
- Greimas, A. J. 1982. Dictionnaire de l'ancien français jusqu'au milieu du XIVe siècle, second edition, revised and corrected. Paris: Libraire Larousse. OCLC 222960085 ISBN 978-2-03-340206-8
- Günther, Ursula. 2001. "Goscalch". The New Grove Dictionary of Music and Musicians, second edition, edited by Stanley Sadie and John Tyrrell. London: Macmillan Publishers.
- Leach, Elizabeth Eva. 2007. Sung Birds: Music, Nature, and Poetry in the Later Middle Ages. Ithaca: Cornell University Press. ISBN 978-0-8014-4491-3
- Lefferts, Peter M. (May 1988). "Subtilitas in the Tonal Language of "Fumeux fume"". Early Music. 16 (2). Oxford University Press: 176–183. doi:10.1093/earlyj/XVI.2.176. JSTOR 3127190.
- Lindfors-Nordin, E. G. 1938. "D'où viennent ces vers?" Zeitschrift für französische Sprache und Literatur 61, nos. 3–4:181–87.
- McComb, Todd M. n.d. "Who were the fumeurs?". www.medieval.org (Accessed 22 February 2014).
- Page, Christopher. 1977. "Machaut's 'Pupil' Deschamps on the Performance of Music: Voices or Instruments in the 14th-Century Chanson". Early Music 5, no. 4 (October): 484–91.
- Plumley, Yolanda. 2003. "An 'Episode in the South'? Ars Subtilior and the Patronage of French Princes". Early Music History 22:103–68.
- Plumley, Yolanda. 2004. "Crossing Borderlines: Points of Contact between the Late-Fourteenth Century French Lyric and Chanson Repertories". Acta Musicologica 76, no. 1:3–23.
- Plumley, Yolanda (2009) [2001]. "Solage". Grove Music Online. Oxford: Oxford University Press. doi:10.1093/gmo/9781561592630.article.26126. ISBN 978-1-56159-263-0. (subscription, Wikilibrary access, or UK public library membership required)
- Reaney, Gilbert. 1954. "The Manuscript Chantilly, Musée Condé 1047". Musica Disciplina 8:59–113.
- Wilkins, Nigel (1979). Music in the age of Chaucer. Cambridge: D.S. Brewer. ISBN 978-0-85991-052-1.
