= Grimace (composer) =

14th-century medieval French composer

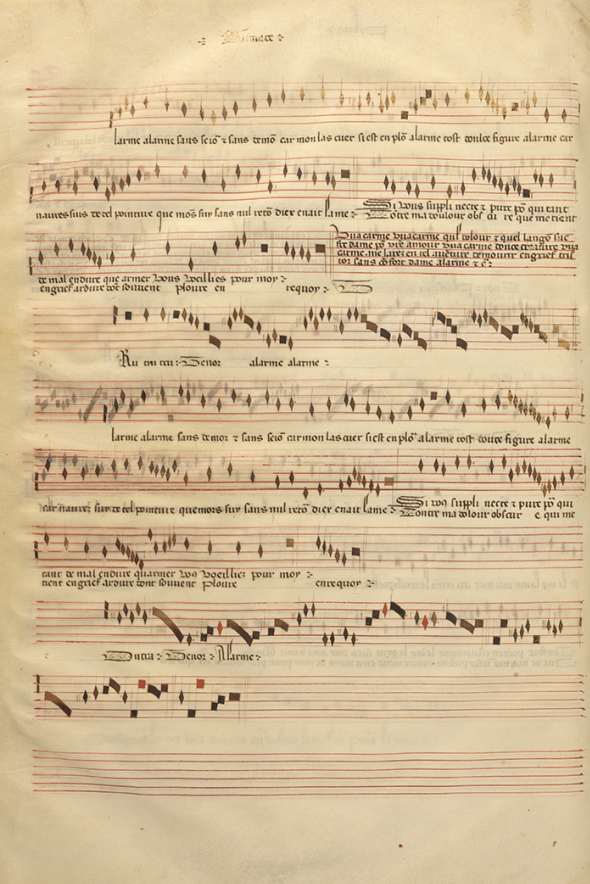
A l’arme A l’arme by Grimace, verso 55 from the Chantilly Codex

Grimace (fl. mid-to-late 14th century; French: [ɡʁi.mas]; also Grymace, Grimache or Magister Grimache) was a French composer in the ars nova style of late medieval music. Virtually nothing is known about Grimace's life other than speculative information based on the circumstances and content of his five surviving compositions of formes fixes: three ballades, a virelai and rondeau. His best known and most often performed work in modern times is the virelai and proto-battaglia: A l’arme A l’arme.

He is thought to have been a younger contemporary of Guillaume de Machaut and based in southern France. Three of his works were included in the Chantilly Codex, which is an important source of ars subtilior music. However, along with P. des Molins, Jehan Vaillant and F. Andrieu, Grimace was one of the post-Machaut generation whose music shows few distinctly ars subtilior features, leading scholars to recognize Grimace's work as closer to the ars nova style of Machaut.

== Identity and career ==
Almost nothing is known about Grimace's life other than the authorship of five works: three ballades, a virelai and rondeau, all of which are formes fixes. Grimace's identity remains unknown and his mononymous name is likely a sobriquet, similar to other composers of his time such as Zacar, Trebor, and possibly also Solage. His name is recorded in medieval manuscript sources with multiple variants, including Grimace, Grymace, Grimache and Magister Grimache. Grimace is thought to be French or to have been active in the courts of southern France, since two of his ballades, Des que buisson and Se Zephirus/Se Jupiter (a double ballade), and the virelai A l’arme A l’arme (Note: Variously referred to as A l’arme A l’arme, Alarme Alarme, or A l’arme/A l’arme/Tru tru.) are included in the Chantilly Codex, a 14th-century manuscript containing almost exclusively secular music by French composers. Similarities to the music of Guillaume de Machaut (c. 1300 – 1377), the most significant European composer of the 14th century, suggests they are contemporaries. The strongest resemblance is found in Machaut's works from the 1360s and 70s, furthering that Grimace was a younger contemporary of Machaut, who flourished in the mid-to-late 14th century. Musicologist Gilbert Reaney speculated that Se Zephirus/Se Jupiter might have been written for Gaston III, Count of Foix and John I of Aragon.

== Music ==
=== Overview ===
External audio
- Des que buisson performed by Fortune Obscure
- Se Zephirus/Se Jupiter performed by the Ferrara Ensemble

The Chantilly Codex is a primary source of ars subtilior music; however, Grimace's works have been noted as lacking the complicated rhythms that characterize the style, without variations in the value of the shortest note and rarely using syncopated rhythms. His music, especially his ballades, bear a closer resemblance to that of Machaut, an ars nova composer. Despite their parallels, Reaney notes that Grimace's contributions to the Chantilly Codex are more advanced than those of Machaut. (Note: This would be in comparison to Machaut's three ballades that appear in the Chantilly Codex: De petit peu, de nient volenté (B18), De Fortune me doy pleindre et loer (B23), and the double ballade, Quant Theseus, Hercules et Jason/Ne quier veoir la beauté d’Absalon (B34).) Nevertheless, with P. des Molins, Jehan Vaillant, and F. Andrieu, Grimace was one of the "post-Machaut" generation whose pieces retain enough ars nova qualities to be separable from those of the rhythmically-complex ars subtilior composers such as Johannes Cuvelier and Johannes Susay. Musicologist Wulf Arlt cites Grimace specifically as a transitional figure from the "Machaut-style" to the "Post-Machaut" style; both before ars subtilior. This especially included the continuation of the ballade in the same general structure and style of Machaut.

In both of Grimace's four-part works, A l’arme A l’arme and Des que buisson, each upper part builds a contrapuntal relationship off the lowest part (tenor), while the tenor itself exchanges this role with the second lowest part (contratenor), usually when the latter goes below the tenor. This happens often since the contratenor is usually lower, except at important section endings, similar to late works by Machaut such as Phyton (B39), although as B39 is in three parts, the lower contratenor does not, there, take on any contrapuntal foundation.

=== Ballades ===
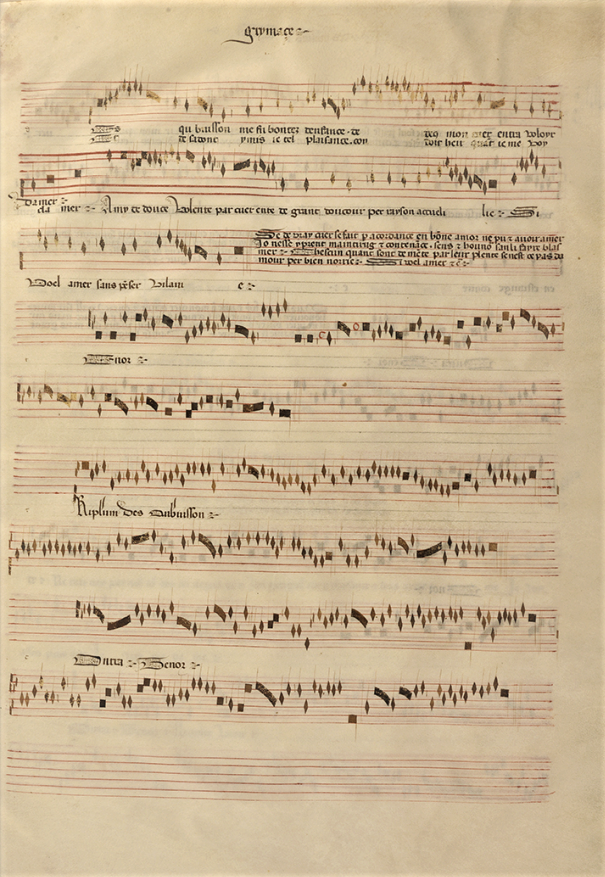
Des que buisson and Se Zephirus/Se Jupiter, recto 53 from the Chantilly Codex

The two part ballade Dedens mon cuer survives, but is incomplete, and shares an identical refrain text with Trebor's ballade Passerose de beaute. Musicologist Yolanda Plumley notes that Dedens mon cuer also has textual similarities to other "Machaut-style" ballades: Egidius's Roses et lis ay veu en une fleur and the anonymous En mon cuer est un blanc cine pourtrait.

En mon cuer est un blanc cine pourtrait
Qu'Amour y a navre si doucement
D'un dart d'amours que ma dame y a trait,
En la playe est un rubins d'orient;
En mon cuer, Anonymous

Dedens mon cuer est pourtrait' un' ymage
Qu'il n'est nulz hom qui peust ymaginer
La grant beaute de son tresdoulz vysage
Qu'Amours y a voulu configurer
Dedens mon cuer, Grimace

One of two surviving four-part works, the ballade Des que buisson is notable for its use of hocket in the triplum (third part) which Günther describes as something that "is striking and contributes to the complementary rhythm of the piece". Since Des que buisson means to represent the coming of spring, musicologist Elizabeth Eva Leach explains the hocket rhythms, as well as falling thirds and repeated notes, as part of a birdsong motif.

In Grimace's double ballade Se Zephirus/Se Jupiter, similarities to Machaut are especially apparent since Grimace adopts musical rhymes at the main cadences. The work has the same rhymes as Machaut's double ballade Quant Theseus/Ne quier (B34), with which it also shares a refrain text. Despite this, Leach notes that Quant Theseus/Ne quier is in four-parts with two texted upper voices and an untexted contratenor, as opposed to the three-part Se Zephirus/Se Jupiter where only the tenor is untexted. Leach furthers that closer technical similarities can be drawn to the polytextual double ballade Je me merveil/J’ay pluseurs fois by Jacob Senleches, and Jehan Vaillant's double rondeau Dame, doucement/Doulz amis. Both texts of Se Zephirus/Se Jupiter have an ubi sunt theme, which is when, as Leach describes it, "hyperbolical comparisons are made between the lady and/or patron and a list of figures from the classical, biblical and/or Christian past". Other works in the Chantilly Codex are representative of this, often signified by also beginning the text with "Se". Se Zephirus/Se Jupiter is Grimace's second most frequently performed work. (Note: Presto Classical lists five recordings of A l’arme A l’arme and two of Se Zephirus/Se Jupiter; Classical Archives only lists three recordings, all of A l’arme A l’arme; ArkivMusic lists three recordings of A l’arme A l’arme and one of Se Zephirus/Se Jupiter; The FAQ CD Index & Directory from Medieval.org lists twelve recordings of A l’arme A l’arme, five of Se Zephirus/Se Jupiter and one of Grimace's other three surviving works.)

=== Virelai ===
External audio
- A l'arme A l'arme performed by the Folger Consort
- A l’arme A l’arme

Grimace's most frequently performed and best known composition is his other four-part work, the virelai A l’arme A l’arme, which musicologist Ursula Günther describes as "unique and extremely interesting", and musicologist Willi Apel characterizes as anticipating the later battaglia form. Musicologist Jeremy Yudkin expands on this, noting the many battle-cry and fanfare-like phrases representing warfare; something that was commonplace in 14th century France. (Note: France was involved in the Hundred Years' War from 1337 to 1453.) The work is for four-parts – two cantus parts, a contratenor, and a tenor – and the cantus voices share text, while the contratenor and tenor parts imitate the upper voices despite being un-texted. At the same time, the contratenor and tenor have their own syncopation and rhythmic interplay with each other. Yudkin notes that the work's second section has a more "chordal texture", leading to a half cadence in the first ending. A copy of the piece in the Codex Reina is missing the second cantus part, although musicologist Virginia Ervin Newes noted that this version is notable "since it has the added text in the tenor and contratenor at each point of imitation".

=== Rondeau ===
Grimace's rondeau for three parts, Je voy ennui, survived in manuscript 222 C. 22 in the Bibliothèque municipale of Strasbourg until 1870/1, when it was destroyed during the Franco-Prussian War. The music is now known only in a c. 1866 transcription of this source by musicologist Edmond de Coussemaker; it is preserved in Brussels, Bibliothèque du Conservatoire Royal de Musique, MS 56286. Je voy ennui has less directional counterpoint than his other works, potentially due to errors in the transcription that are now uncheckable.

=== Doubtful works ===
Apel proposed that two virelais – C’estoit ma douce and Rescoés: Horrible feu d’ardent desir/Rescoés: Le feu de mon loyal servant – are by Grimace based on stylistic similarities, the latter of which shows considerable textual and musical similarities to A l’arme A l’arme. Their attribution remains doubtful.

== Works ==
List of compositions by Grimace
| Title | No. of voices | Genre | Manuscript source: Folios (Note: "v" and "r" stand for verso and recto respectively; in left-right language books, verso is the front page while recto is the back page.) | Apel | Greene |
|---|---|---|---|---|---|
| Dedens mon cuer | 2 | Ballade | Bern, Burgerbibliothek. Sammlung Bongarsiana, A. 471, f 23v University of Pennsylvania, MS 11 (text only) | A 34 | G Vol 20: 14 |
| Des que buisson | 4 | Ballade | Chantilly Codex: 53r San Lorenzo: 146v [99v] | A 35 | G Vol 19: 86 |
| Se Zephirus/Se Jupiter | 3 | (Double) Ballade | Chantilly Codex: 53r | A 36 | G Vol 18: 15 |
| A l’arme/A l’arme/Tru tru | 4 | Virelai | Chantilly Codex: 55v | A 37 | G Vol 19: 91; G Vol 21: 22 |
| A l’arme/A l’arme/Tru tru | 3 | Virelai | Codex Reina: 69v | – | – |
| Je voy ennui | 3 | Rondeau | [F-Sm 222 C. 22]: 25r (Note: This manuscript was destroyed in 1870/1.) | – | – |
| Je voy ennui | 3 | Rondeau | MS 56286: 25r | A 38 | G Vol 22: 5 |
No other works by Grimace survive

Doubtful attributions
| Title | No. of voices | Genre | Manuscript source: Folios | Apel | Greene |
|---|---|---|---|---|---|
| C’estoit ma douce nouriture | 3 | Virelai | Codex Reina: 64r San Lorenzo: 133v-134r [101v-102r] Munich, Bayerische Staatsbibliothek Clm 29775 vol. 8 | A 186 | G Vol 21: 22 |
| Horrible feu d’ardent desir/Rescoés: Le feu de mon loyal servant | 3 | Virelai | Codex Reina: 58r | A 222 | G Vol 21: 57 |

=== Editions ===
Grimace's works are included in the following collections:

- Apel, Willi, ed. (1970). French Secular Compositions of the Fourteenth Century. Corpus mensurabilis musicae. Vol. 1, Ascribed Compositions. Cambridge: American Institute of Musicology. OCLC 311424615.
- Mudge, Charles Roswell (1972–78). The Pennsylvania Chansonnier: A Critical Edition of Ninety-five Anonymous Ballades from the Fourteenth Century with Introduction, Notes and Glossary. Bloomington: Indiana University Press. OCLC 32768372.
- Greene, Gordon K., ed. (1981–89). French Secular Music. Polyphonic Music of the Fourteenth Century. Vol. 18–22. Monaco: Éditions de l'Oiseau-Lyre.

- Greene, Gordon K., ed. (1982). Manuscript Chantilly, Musée Condé 564 Part 1, nos. 1–50. Polyphonic Music of the Fourteenth Century. Vol. 18. Monaco: Éditions de l'Oiseau-Lyre. OCLC 181660103.
- Greene, Gordon K., ed. (1982). Manuscript Chantilly, Musée Condé 564 Part 2, nos. 51–100. Polyphonic Music of the Fourteenth Century. Vol. 19. Monaco: Éditions de l'Oiseau-Lyre. OCLC 181661945.
- Greene, Gordon K., ed. (1982). Ballads and Canons. Polyphonic Music of the Fourteenth Century. Vol. 20. Monaco: Éditions de l'Oiseau-Lyre. OCLC 880124843.
- Greene, Gordon K., ed. (1987). Virelais. Polyphonic Music of the Fourteenth Century. Vol. 21. Monaco: Éditions de l'Oiseau-Lyre. OCLC 16712618.
- Greene, Gordon K., ed. (1989). Rondeaux and Miscellaneous Pieces. Polyphonic Music of the Fourteenth Century. Vol. 22. Monaco: Éditions de l'Oiseau-Lyre. OCLC 19540959.
