= F. Andrieu =

14th-century medieval French composer

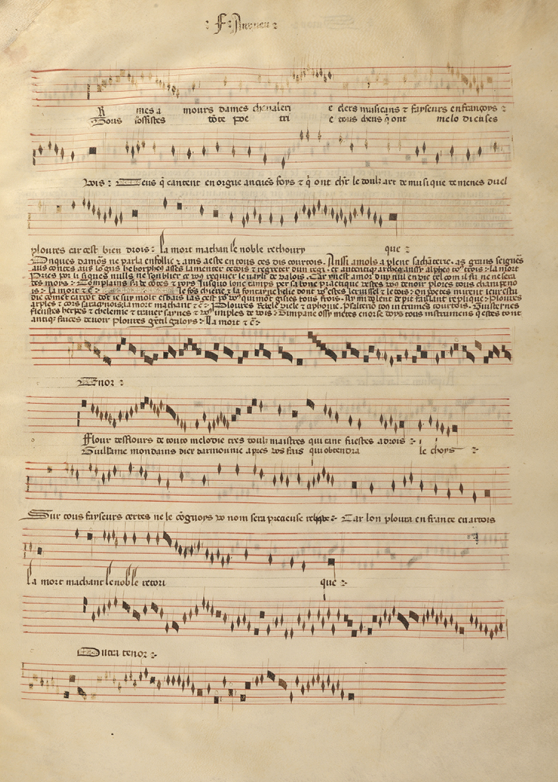
Andrieu's Armes, amours/O flour des flours, recto 52 in the Chantilly Codex

F. Andrieu (fl. late 14th century; possibly François or Franciscus Andrieu) was a French composer in the ars nova style of late medieval music. Nothing is known for certain about him except that he wrote Armes, amours/O flour des flours (Weapons, loves/O flower of flowers), a double ballade déploration, for the death of the composer and poet Guillaume de Machaut in 1377. The work has been widely praised and analyzed; it is notable for being one of two extant medieval double ballades for four voices, the only known contemporary musical setting of Eustache Deschamps and the earliest representative of the longstanding medieval and Renaissance lamentation tradition between composers.

Andrieu may be the same person as Magister Franciscus, although the scholarly consensus on this identification is unclear. With P. des Molins, Jehan Vaillant and Grimace, Andrieu was one of the "post-Machaut" generation whose pieces retain enough ars nova qualities to be differentiated from composers of ars subtilior.

== Identity and career ==
Nothing is known for certain about Andrieu except his authorship of the double ballade for four voices: Armes, amours/O flour des flours (Weapons, loves/O flower of flowers), a déploration tribute for the death of poet-composer Guillaume de Machaut (c. 1300–1377), the most significant European composer of the 14th century. The work is adapted from two texts by a student of Machaut, the poet Eustache Deschamps, making Andrieu's work the only surviving contemporary musical settings of over 1,500 lyrics by Deschamps. (Note: De Narcissus by Magister Franciscus may have text by Deschamps but this is uncertain.) Musicologist Gilbert Reaney notes that this would mean that, from what is known about Andrieu, he is a "pure musician". (Note: Based on the information available, since Andrieu only wrote the music, not the text, he can be seen as a "pure musician"; as opposed to a poet-composer like Machaut.) The work is contained in the Chantilly Codex from the Musée Condé. (Note: The text alone survives in two other manuscript sources: F-Pn fr. 840 and f. 28r-v.) While historian Gaston Raynaud dates the text between April and 28 May 1377, Andrieu may have set it to music anytime from then up until 15 years later (the Chantilly Codex was likely assembled sometime during 1393 to 1395).

Andrieu's association with Machaut's death in 1377 suggests he was French and flourished in the late 14th century. The "F." most likely stands for either "François" or "Franciscus". References to "F. Andrieu" outside of the Chantilly Codex are absent from other manuscript sources, leading to speculation that he is the composer Magister Franciscus, who wrote two ballades also present in the Chantilly Codex: De Narcissus and Phiton, Phiton, beste tres venimeuse. The scholarly consensus on the certainty of this identification is unclear. (Note: Scholars identify F. Andrieu as Magister Franciscus with varying degrees of certainty: Reaney 2001: Their works being from the same manuscript "suggest that the two composers may be the same person".; Reaney 1986, p. 27: "Franciscus is doubtless the same man as the F. Andrieu..."; Reaney 1954, p. 67: "It would not be impossible for Magister Franciscus and F. Andrieu to be one and the same person"; Günther 2001: "[Magister Franciscus] may be the F. Andrieu..."; Strohm 2005, p. 53: "[F. Andrieu] may be the same man as Magister Franciscus"; Magnan 1993, p. 49: "[On the identification between Andrieu and Franciscus] this tenuous identification leads nowhere.") Reaney notes that Magister Franciscus's works are likely earlier than Andrieu's, between 1370 and 1376. Musicologist Guillaume de Van proposed that the Chantilly Codex was created for use in music schools; because of this, stylistic similarities to Machaut, and the lack of additional records on Andrieu, musicologist Robert Magnan suggested Andrieu was a student or teacher, utilizing Machaut's style to honor his master.

== Music ==
=== Overview ===
External audio
- Performances of Armes, amours/O flour des flours
- Performance by the Sollazzo Ensemble
- Performance by the Musica Nova

Andrieu's only surviving work is the double ballade déploration for four voices: Armes, amours/O flour des flours, although Reaney notes that "this work alone, however, makes him of considerable interest". Written for Machaut's death, Andrieu's style is understandably similar to his, with musicologist Gustave Reese noting that the work shows the "vigorous survival" of Machaut's influence. Andrieu's work is one of two extant four-part double ballades of medieval music, the other being Quant Theseus/Ne quier veoir (B 34) by Machaut. A polyphonic double ballade is a fitting homage for Machaut, since he is credited as the genre's originator. As a double ballade, Armes, amours/O flour des flours has two texts sung simultaneously between the cantus voices, Cantus I beginning with "Armes, amours" and Cantus II with "O flour des flours". The work's four part division—two cantus (with text), contratenor, and tenor (without text)—was an older style and atypical of the usual three part—cantus (with text), contratenor and tenor (without text)—structure that dominated the 14th-century ballade repertory. (Note: In early music polyphony, the cantus refers to the highest voice. The lower voices were the contratenor and tenor, and by the late 14th-century they stayed in relatively same range of each other.) Andrieu's decision to use more traditional vocal parts may be a reflection of Deschamps's text, which is written in a "classicized high poetic style".

It is also the earliest surviving déploration for the death of a fellow composer—a popular tradition in medieval and Renaissance music. Later examples included Johannes Ockeghem's Mort, tu as navré de ton dart (1460) for Gilles Binchois; Josquin des Prez's Nymphes des bois (1497) for Ockeghem; and William Byrd's Ye Sacred Muses (1585) for Thomas Tallis. (Note: See Rice (1999, p. 31) for a complete list of extant medieval and Renaissance déplorations.) While the Chantilly Codex is a primary source of ars subtilior music, with P. des Molins, Jehan Vaillant and Grimace, Andrieu is part of the "post-Machaut" generation whose pieces retain enough ars nova qualities to be differentiated from those of the rhythmically-complex ars subtilior composers such as Johannes Cuvelier and Johannes Susay.

Musicologist Eric Rice identifies two common characteristics in the text of typical déplorations: the "planctus" (from Latin: planctus) and the "discourse". (Note: The "planctus" is not to be confused with the medieval Latin genre of lamentation of the same name.) The "planctus" refers to an involuntary sudden outburst of emotion, while the "discourse" is a calmer and clearer expression of grief. Deschamps's text contains both recurring and nonrecurring "planctus" exclamations. "Las!" (Old French for 'Alas!'), from the second strophe, is a "planctus" exclamation that is nonrecurring; Rice considers this a "stereotyped exclamation of grief".

Le fons Dircé et la fontayne Helie
Dont vous estes le ruissel et le dois,
Ou poëtes mirent leur estudie,
Conveint taire, dont je suy molt destrois.
Las! C'est pour vous qui mort gisiés tous frois
[Qu']ay un dolent depit, faillant replique,
Plourés, arpes et cors saracynois,
La mort Machaut, le noble retorique.
(second strophe by Cantus II) Eustache Deschamps

The fount of Dirce, the fountain of Helie,
Of which you are the stream and the course
In which poets have put their study
Must now be muted, which me much distresses.
Alas! It is for you, who lie cold and dead,
That I have grievous pain, lacking reply,
Weep, harps and Saracenhorns, for
The death of Machaut, the noble rhetorician
English translation by Howard B. Garey

=== Refrain ===
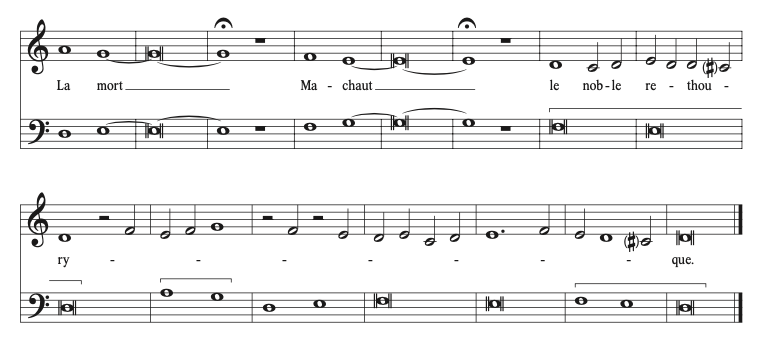
The refrain from Armes, armes/O flour des flours in modern notation

The text of Deschamps's two ballades share a refrain: "La mort Machaut, le noble retorique". (Note: Retorique has also been spelled as "rethouryque", or "rhetorique".) Musicologist Elizabeth Randell Upton notes that the "shared refrain receives the most striking coordination of the ballades' voices". Rice considers the refrain a reoccurring "planctus" since it appears at the end of each strophe; ballades were typically in aabC form – where C is always the same. Andrieu signifies the "planctus" by setting the words "La mort" and "Machaut" in long notes but followed by rests. By inserting rests, Andrieu disrupts the music and signifies the sudden outburst of emotion that characterizes a "planctus". The practice of using "planctus" during the refrain was abandoned by future composers who used more formal structures such as the cantus firmus.

Andrieu's musical setting of the refrain also highlights the name of the dedicatee (Machaut), by giving all four voices the same rhythm for the first four syllables ("La mort Machaut"). Such an effect gives the phrase a "striking and singular four-voice effect". The following bars give the lower voices subsidiary supporting roles, sustaining the dominance of the texted upper voices. This is assisted by the refrain's repetition, which naturally emphasizes Machaut's name. The designation of "le noble retorique" ("the noble rhetorician") is invented by Deschamps in order to give Machaut a formal title.

=== Similarities to other works ===
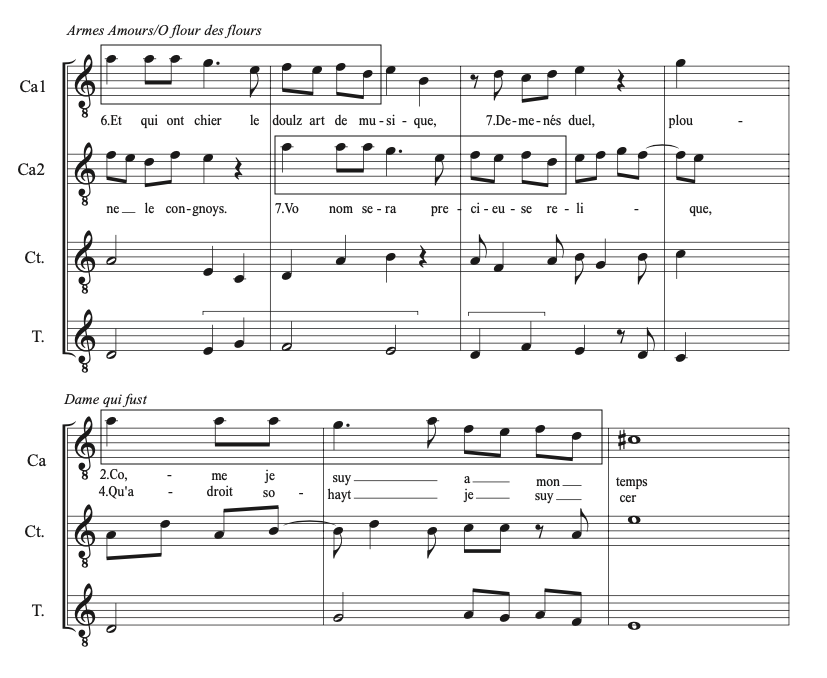
A similar theme in Armes, Amours/O flour des flours and Dame qui fust in modern notation

The Chantilly Codex contains six works – four ballades and two motets – that include their dedicatee's name directly. (Note: Ballades with a direct citation of their dedicatee's name: Armes, Amours/O flour des flours by F. Andrieu; Fuions de ci, fuions povre campaigne by Jacob Senleches; S'aincy estoit que ne feust la noblesce by Solage; Par les bons Gedeon et Sanson deliver by Philippus de Caserta; Motets with a direct citation of their dedicatee's name: Rex Karole, Johannis Genite/Leticie, Pacis, Concordie by Phillipe Roylart; Pictagore per dogmata/O terra sancta by anonymous) (Note: See Upton (2013, p. 77) for a detailed table of all six; see Upton (2013, pp. 79–84) for further information on each ballade.) The dedicatee's proper name is mentioned in all four of these ballades, making them the only ballades of the 14th century to do so. Two of these – Armes, amours/O flour des flours and Jacob Senleches's Fuions de ci, fuions povre campaigne for Eleanor of Aragon, Queen of Castile – lament their subject's death. Both works have the word "retorique" embellished by a melisma on the "ri" for six double whole notes. While Senleches includes himself as part of larger group of mourners, Deschamps names himself directly in the third stanza by stating "Ce vous requiert le bayli de Valois" ("This asks of you the Baliff of Valois"). Nevertheless, Deschamps also includes an invitation to a large group of mourners:

Armes, amours, dames, chevalerie,
Clers, musicans et fayseurs en françoys,
Tous sosfistes, toute poeterie,
Tous cheus qui ont melodieuses vois,
Ceus qui cantent en orgue aucunes foys
Et qui ont chier le doulz art de musique,
Demenés duel, plourés! Car c'est bien drois,
La mort Machaut, le noble ret[orique].
(first strophe by Cantus I) Eustache Deschamps

Weapons, loves, ladies, chivalry,
Clerks, musicians, and writers in French,
All sophists, all poetry,
All those who have melodious voices,
Those who sing to the organ on occasion
And who value the gentle art of music,
Give way to grief, lament, for it is only right,
The death of Machaut, the noble rhetorician
English translation

Musicologist Elizabeth Eva Leach notes that the Armes, amours/O flour des flours has both textual and musical similarities to Machaut's poetry and music respectively. In the refrain, Andrieu's work imitates a passage from the Gloria of Machaut's Messe de Nostre Dame. It also shows a resemblance to Machaut's ballade De Fortune (B23); both works have "the same tonal emphases" and "similar tenor notes at key structure points". Armes, amours/O flour des flours shares a musical theme with the anonymous ballade Dame qui fust, in the Reina Codex, which itself is based on Machaut's De Fortune me doy pleindre (B 23). (Note: The exact time when Dame qui fust was written is unclear so it is uncertain whether Armes, amours/O flour des flours is quoting Dame qui fust or vice versa.) In Andrieu's work, the shared theme appears when the two cantus voices engage in musical imitation, something which was uncommon at the time.

=== Interpretation ===
Leach notes that the work has been "widely discussed by literary and musical scholars alike". According to Leach, the existence of this déploration suggests there was "interest in [Machaut's] own posterity... in the short term at least". Some scholars say this remembrance of Machaut mainly concerned his poetry and suggest that Deschamps did not intend Armes, amours/O flour des flours to be set to music. Magnan argues that Deschamps recognized termed musique artificiele (vocal and instrument performance) and musique naturele (poetry alone) as equally enjoyable. Furthermore, the fact that no other of Deschamps's poems have survived with music indicates that this one would not be any different. Leach disagrees, saying that it being the earliest known musical lamentation for a fellow composer recognizes his "poet-composer" status, as do the words "faysaur" (maker) and "retorique" (rhetorician). The work calls on "those who hold dear the sweet art of music" to mourn Machaut's death, suggesting his musical importance.

According to Leach, the line "Your name will be a precious relic" is contradictory to the traditional Platonism of the time: it dismisses the Platonic idea that a name is only a representation of someone, by suggesting Machaut's name alone is a "relic" and all encompassing to his being.

== Works ==
List of compositions by F. Andrieu
Title	No. of voices	Genre	Manuscript source: Folios (Note: "v" and "r" stand for verso and recto respectively; in left-right language books, verso is the front page while recto is the back page.)	Apel	Greene
Armes, amours/O flour des flours (Note: Sometimes referred to as Armes, amours/O flour or with the longer title: Armes, amours, dames chevaleries/O flours de toute melodie.) (Weapons, loves/O flower of flowers)	4	(Double) ballade	Chantilly Codex: 52r	A 2	G Vol 19: 84
No other works by Andrieu survive (Note: If F. Andrieu is identifiable with Magister Franciscus, then Franciscus's compositions would be his as well.)

=== Editions ===
Andrieu's work is included in the following collections:

- Droz, Eugénie; Thibault, Geneviève, eds. (1924). Poètes et musiciens du XVe siècle [Poets and Musicians of the 15th Century] (in French). Paris. OCLC 3865780.
- Apel, Willi [in German] (1970–1972). French Secular Compositions of the Fourteenth Century. Corpus mensurabilis musicae 53. Vol. 1, Ascribed Compositions. Cambridge, Massachusetts: American Institute of Musicology. OCLC 311424615.
- Greene, Gordon K., ed. (1982). Manuscript Chantilly, Musée Condé 564 Part 2, nos. 51–100. Polyphonic Music of the Fourteenth Century. Vol. 19. Monaco: Éditions de l'Oiseau-Lyre. OCLC 181661945.

== Recordings ==
F. Andrieu's Armes, amours/O flour des flours is included in the following albums:

Recordings of Armes, amours/O flour des flours
Year	Album	Performers	Director	Label
1973	Music au temps des Papes en Avignon	Florilegium Musicum de Paris	Jean-Claude Malgoire	CBS Masterworks 76534
1973	The Art of Courtly Love. Vol. I. "Guillaume Machaut and His Age"	Early Music Consort of London	David Munrow	Conte HMV SLS 863
1974	Dufay and His Times	Syntagma Musicum	Kees Otten	Telefunken ER 6.35257
1975	Guillaume de Machaut: 1. The Musical Art of Machaut. 2. Le Remède de	Ensemble Guillaume de Machaut of Paris	–	Adès 7078
1978	Hommage à Machaut	Ars Cameralis	–	Panton 8111 0056
1979 [1977]	Guillaume de Machaut Messe de Nostre Dame. Trois motets latins	Séminaire Européen De Musique Ancienne	Bernard Gagnepain	Erato EFM 18041 (LP)
1986	A Distant Mirror: Music of the 14th Century and Shakespeare's Music	Folger Consort	–	Delos DE1003
1987	The Chantilly Codex	Ensemble Organum	Marcel Pérès	Harmonia Mundi HMC 1252
1987	Codex Chantilly: airs de cour	Ensemble Organum	Marcel Pérès	HMC 901252
1989	Ars Magis Subtiliter	Project Ars Nova (Ensemble P.A.N.)	–	New Albion Records NA 021
2003	Guillaume de Machaut: Unrequited	Liber UnUsualis	–	LU 1001
