= P. des Molins =

14th-century medieval French composer

P. des Molins (fl. mid 14th century), probably Pierre des Molins, (Note: A few medieval sources refer to him as Die molen van Pariis) was a French composer-poet in the ars nova style of late medieval music. His two surviving compositions – the ballade De ce que fol pensé and rondeau Amis, tout dous vis – were tremendously popular as they are among the most transmitted pieces of fourteenth-century music. The ballade is found in 12 medieval manuscript sources and featured in a c. 1420 tapestry; the rondeau is found in 8 sources and referenced by the Italian poet Simone de' Prodenzani. Along with Grimace, Jehan Vaillant and F. Andrieu, Molins was one of the post-Guillaume de Machaut generation whose music shows few distinctly ars subtilior features, leading scholars to recognize Molins's work as closer to the ars nova style of Machaut.

== Identity and career ==
P. des Molins is only known for two works, the three-part ballade De ce que fol pensé and three-part rondeau Amis, tout dous vis. No secure biographical information about Molins exists. His name is given as "P. des Molins" in the Chantilly Codex and as "Mulino" in the codex, Paris, Bibl. Nat. MS ital. 568. In several sources, the title of Amis, tout dous [le] vis is given as "The mills of Paris," (Molendium de Paris, Die molen van Pariis, and El Molin de Paris), probably misconstruing the name of the composer (Molins means mill) as the title of the piece. His name signifies that he originally hailed from the north of France, although he is thought to have emigrated to southern France at the Avignon court. In doing so he would have been in the company of many composers of the time, such as Grimace, Jacob Senleches and Trebor.

Craig Wright has suggested that he was the musician in the court of Jean II, King of France, named "Perotus de Molyno," placing him in England from 1357 to 1359. The reference to the "languid en estrange contrée" in De ce que fol could refer to the captivity of the court under King Edward III. Earlier, Suzanne Clercx and Richard Hoppin suggested that he could have been the Petrus de Molendino, civis parisiensis mentioned in connection with Pope Clement VI in 1345. Ursula Günther has connected him tentatively with a Perrotum Danielis alias del moli from a document from 1387 or as the chancellor of the Duke of Berry, Philippe de Moulins mentioned in 1368 and 1371.

Con l'organi framegni fe' Rigolti
Et fe' Très belles dames de la Spagnia
Et Mach Got frou de la Magnia
Sciuch et chic noc et sambergotti
Et Molin de Paris con dolce botti...

== Music ==
External image
- Tapestry which includes De ce que fol pense

=== De ce que fol pense ===
De ce que fol pense appears in twelve sources. In one of these sources, Strasbourg 222, it is attributed to Guillaume de Machaut, an ascription universally rejected by scholars. The composition's opening cantus part appears in a 15th-century tapestry depicting a lady harp player reading from the score held by her servant.

=== Amis, tout dous vis ===
Amis, tous dous [le] vis appears in eight musical sources and is cited in Il Solazzo by Simone de' Prodenzani. Amis, tout dous vis is found as a highly decorated version in some sources; the work is listed as Di molen van Pariis and is likely intended to be instrumental.

== Works ==
List of compositions by P. des Molins
Title	No. of voices	Genre	Manuscript source: Folios (Note: "v" and "r" stand for verso and recto respectively; in left-right language books, verso is the front page while recto is the back page.)	Apel	Greene
De ce que fol pense	3	Ballade	F-CA 1328 (CaB): 18v, previously 5v F-CA 1328 (CaB): 16, previously 10r (unreadable) F-Pn 6771 (PR): 71v (partial text) F-CH 564 (Ch): 53v (full text) F-Pn 568 (Pit): 124r (partial text) B-Gr 3360 (Gr): 3v (partial text) I-Fn 26 (FP): 87r-86v (partial text) GB-Lbl 41667(I) (McV), part I: f.26r, no. 2 (partial text) D-Mbs 15611 (Mu): 229v–230r (partial text) F-Sm 222 (Str): f.36v, no. 52 (partial text) F-Pn 23190 (Trém): f.13, no. 88 (lost) (Note: An incipit of De ce que fol pense is listed in the index of F-Pn 23190 (Trém), but the page on which the piece appeared is lost.) I-FZc 117 (Fa): 40r–40v. Instrumental version (partial text) F-Pn n.a.f. 6221 (I): 19v (full text only)	A 84	G Vol 19
Amis, tout dous vis	3	Rondeau	I-IV 115 (Iv): 3r–2v, 3st F-Pn 568 (Pit): 4r–3v, 3st (partial text only in Cantus part) CS-Pu XI E9 (Pg): 251r, no. 20, 2st (no text) F-Sm 222 (Str): 24r, no.33, 4st F-Sm 222 (Str): 79v, no.134, 3st (partial text only_ F-Pn 23190 (Trém): 10, no. 86. (lost) (Note: An incipit of Amis, tout dous vis is listed in the index of F-Pn 23190 (Trém), but the page on which the piece appeared is lost.) I-GR 16 (Gr): 1r, 3st (fragmented) I-CORac: verso of single folio 3st (fragmented)	A 85	G Vol 22

=== Editions ===
P. des Molins's works are included in the following collections:

- Apel, Willi, ed. (1970). French Secular Compositions of the Fourteenth Century. Corpus mensurabilis musicae 53. Vol. 1, Ascribed Compositions. Cambridge: American Institute of Musicology. OCLC 311424615.
- Greene, Gordon K., ed. (1981–89). French Secular Music. Polyphonic Music of the Fourteenth Century. Vol. 19, 22. Monaco: Éditions de l'Oiseau-Lyre.

- Greene, Gordon K., ed. (1982). Manuscript Chantilly, Musée Condé 564 Part 2, nos. 51–100. Polyphonic Music of the Fourteenth Century. Vol. 19. Monaco: Éditions de l'Oiseau-Lyre. OCLC 181661945.
- Greene, Gordon K., ed. (1989). Rondeaux and Miscellaneous Pieces. Polyphonic Music of the Fourteenth Century. Vol. 22. Monaco: Éditions de l'Oiseau-Lyre. OCLC 19540959.

== Recordings ==
Recordings of Music by P. des Molins
Year	Album	Performers	Piece	Label
1973	Art of Courtly Love	Early Music Consort of London	Amis, tous dous	Conte HMV SLS 863
1989	Ars Magis Subtiliter	Ensemble Project Ars Nova	De ce que fol pense	New Albion 021
1999	D'amours loial servant	Alla Francesca	De ce que fol pense	Virgin Veritas 7243 5 45357 2 7
2002	Wolkenstein	Ensemble Alta Musica	De ce que fol pense	Carpe Diem 16265
2003	Unrequited	Liber Unusualis	De ce que fol pense	LU 1001
2004	Zodiac	Capilla Flamenca	De ce que fol pense	Eufoda 1360
2005	Alta musica	Ensemble Alta Musica	Amis, tous dous	Carpe Diem 16260
2010	Oswald von Wolkenstein - Songs of Myself	Andreas Scholl & Shield of Harmony	Amis, tous dous	Harmonia Mundi HMC 902051
