= Chantilly Codex =

Medieval music manuscript

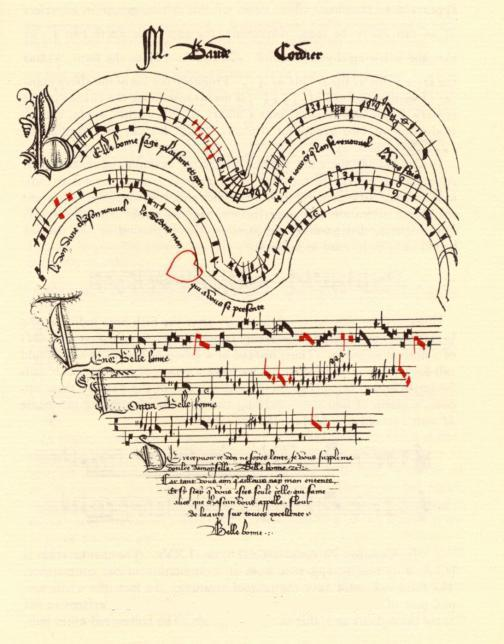
The chanson Belle, Bonne, Sage by Baude Cordier, written in the shape of a heart, with a red note coloration string of notes forming another heart

The Chantilly Codex (Chantilly, Musée Condé MS 564) is a manuscript of medieval music containing pieces from the style known as the Ars subtilior. It is held in the museum at the Château de Chantilly in Chantilly, Oise.

Most of the compositions in the Chantilly Codex date from c. 1350–1400. There are 112 pieces total, mostly by French composers, and all of them polyphonic. The codex contains examples of many of the most popular French song styles of its time, such as ballades, rondeaus, virelais, and isorhythmic motets. Some of the motets are rhythmically extremely complex, and are written in intricately exact musical notation. Two pieces by Baude Cordier were added at a slightly later date at the front of the manuscript, and use unusual shapes to reflect their musical contents. The piece "Belle, Bonne, Sage, Plaisant" (image right) was written to a special lady for the New Year, and reflects the shape of the notation with the text (Lovely, good, wise, and pleasant). The graphic layout of the notation is a play on words on the "Cor" ("heart") in "Cordier".

The Chantilly Codex is known to contain music from the composers Johannes Symonis, Jehan Suzay, P. des Molins, Goscalch, Solage, Baude Cordier, Grimace, Guido, Guillaume de Machaut, Jehan Vaillant, F. Andrieu, Magister Franciscus, Johannes Cuvelier, Rodericus, Trebor, and Jacob Senleches.

== Editions ==
The majority of the 112 pieces are found in Willi Apel, ed., French Secular Compositions of the Fourteenth Century (American Institute of Musicology, 1970)

== Selected recordings ==
The following recordings include selections from the 112 pieces:

- Ensemble Organum (Marcel Pérès, dir.). Codex Chantilly: Airs de cour du XIVe siècle. Arles: Harmonia Mundi, 1987. CD recording HMC 901252.
- Ensemble P. A. N. Ars Magis Subtiliter: Secular Music of the Chantilly Codex''. San Francisco: New Albion, 1989. CD recording NA 021.
- Medieval Ensemble of London (Peter Davies and Timothy Davies, dir. Ce diabolic chant: Ballades, Rondeaus & Virelais of the Late Fourteenth Century). Florilegium Series. London: Éditions de L'Oiseau-Lyre, 1983. LP recording DSDL 704; Reissued 2007 on L'Oiseau-Lyre CD 475 9119.
- New London Consort (Philip Pickett, dir.). Ars subtilior. Glasgow, Scotland: Linn Records, 1998. CD recording CKD 039.
- De Caelis Codex Chantilly dir. Laurence Brisset. Aeon 2010.
- Figures of Harmony, Songs of Codex Chantilly, c. 1390, 2015. 4-CD box set.
