= Jehan de Lescurel =

14th-century medieval French composer

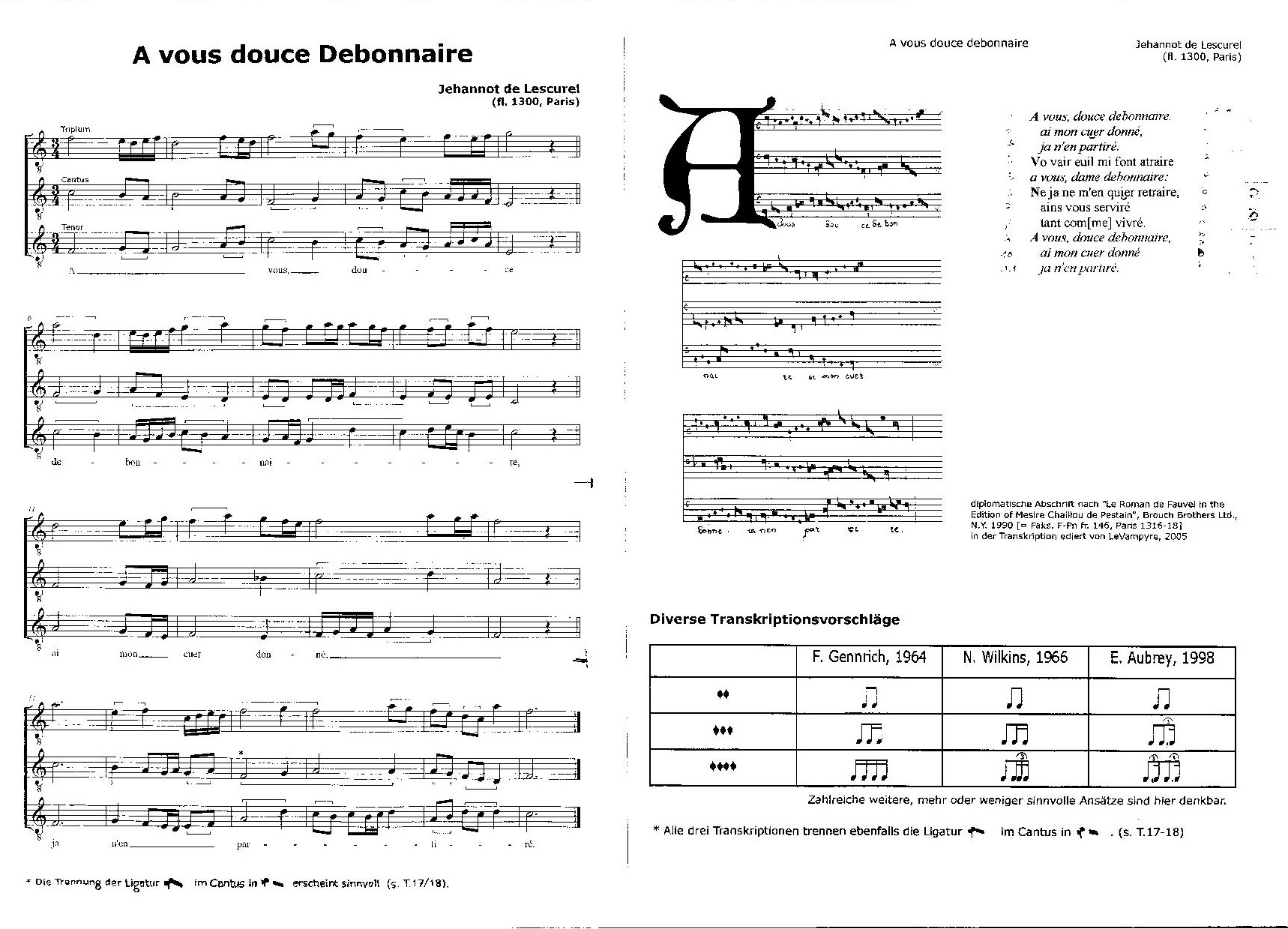
Score of A vous douce debonnaire by Jehan

Jehan de Lescurel (fl. early 14th century; also Jehannot de l'Escurel) was a composer-poet of late medieval music. Jehan's extensive surviving oeuvre is an important and rare examples of the formes fixes before the time of Guillaume de Machaut; it consists of 34 works: 20 ballades, 12 rondeaus and two long narrative poems, diz entés. All but one of his compositions is monophonic, representing the end of the trouvère tradition and the beginning of the polyphonic ars nova style centered around the formes fixes.

== Identity and career ==
Jehan de Lescurel is also known as Jehannot de l'Escurel. Very little is known of his life; the transmission, notation and circumstances of his works suggest he was active in the early 14th century, and his compositions's textual references indicate he was active in Paris. It has also been inferred that Jehan was the son of a merchant and probably received his musical training at the Notre Dame de Paris. For many years, scholars assumed he was the 'Jehan de Lescurel' who had been hanged on 23 May 1304 along with three other young clerics of Notre Dame, including Oudinet Pisdoé, for "debauchery" and "crimes against women". Recent research has shown that "Jehan de Lescurel" was a rather common name in early fourteenth-century Paris, and there is no other clear link between the composer and cleric.

== Music ==
He was a transitional figure from the trouvère period to the ars nova. His lyrical style unites him with the composers of the later period. The sole source for his music is the same manuscript (Paris, Bibliothèque nationale de France, MS français 146) which preserves the interpolated version of the Roman de Fauvel.

Most of his works are monophonic songs, in the style of the trouvères; only one of his 34 works is polyphonic, although he wrote other works which have not survived. The songs are virelais, ballades, rondeaux; they include word painting more in the style of the later 14th-century composers than those of the 13th century; they are simple, charming, and debauchery is not a prominent theme. Jehan also has two extant diz entés, lengthy poems with music set only to the refrain text.

== Works ==
List of compositions by Jehan de Lescurel
W	Title	Genre
W 1	A vous, douce debonnaire (Note: Version for three voices)	Rondeau
W 2	Amours aus vrais cuers commune	Ballade
W 3	A vous, douce debonnaire (Note: Version for one voice)	Rondeau
W 4	Amours cent mille merciz	Ballade
W 5	Amour, voules vous acorder	Ballade
W 6	Amours que vous ai meffait	Ballade
W 7	Abundance de felonnie	Ballade
W 8	Amours trop vous doi cherir	Ballade
W 9	Bietris est mes delis	Rondeau
W 10	Bien se lace	Ballade
W 11	Bontes, sen, valours et pris	Ballade
W 12	Bonne amour me rent	Ballade
W 13	Bonnement m'agree	Rondeau
W 14	Belle et noble a bonne estrainne	Rondeau
W 15	Bien se peust apercevoir	Ballade
W 16	Belle com loiaus amans	Ballade
W 17	Comment que pour l'eloignance	Ballade
W 18	De gracieuse dame amer	Rondeau
W 19	De la grant joie d'amours	Ballade
W 20	Douce Amour confortez moi	Ballade
W 21	Dame vo regars m'ont mis en la voie	Ballade
W 22	D'amour qui n'est bien celee	Ballade
W 23	Dame gracieuse et bele	Ballade
W 24	Dame, par vo dous regart	Rondeau
W 25	Douce dame je vous pri	Rondeau
W 26	Douce desirree	Rondeau
W 27	Dame, si vous vient a gre	Rondeau
W 28	Diex quant la verrai	Rondeau
W 29	Dis tans plus qu'il ne faudroit flours	Ballade
W 30	Fi, mesdisans esragie	Ballade
W 31	Guilleurs me font mout souvent	Rondeau
W 32	Gracieusette	Ballade
W 33	Gracieuse, faitisse et sage	Diz entez
W 34	Gracieus temps est quant rosier	Diz entez
No other works by Jehan survive

=== Editions ===
- Wilkins, Nigel [in French] (1966). The Works of Jehan de l'Escurel. Corpus mensurabilis musicae. Vol. 30. Cambridge, Massachusetts: American Institute of Musicology. OCLC 1123637753.
