= Magister Franciscus =

14th-century medieval French composer

- Occupation: Composer
- Era: Ars nova
- Known for: De Narcissus; Phiton, Phiton, beste tres venimeuse

Magister Franciscus (fl. 1370–80) was a French composer in the ars nova style of late medieval music. He is known for two surviving works, the three-part ballades: De Narcissus and Phiton, Phiton, beste tres venimeuse; the former was widely distributed in his lifetime. Modern scholarship disagrees on whether Franciscus was the same person as the composer F. Andrieu.

== Identity and career ==
Franciscus may be the same person as the F. Andrieu who wrote Armes, amours/O flour des flours, a déploration on the death of poet-composer Guillaume de Machaut (c. 1300–1377). Although, the scholarly consensus on this identification is unclear. (Note: Scholars identify F. Andrieu as Magister Franciscus with varying degrees of certainty: Reaney 2001: Their works being from the same manuscript "suggest that the two composers may be the same person".; Reaney 1986, p. 27: "Franciscus is doubtless the same man as the F. Andrieu..."; Reaney 1954, p. 67: "It would not be impossible for Magister Franciscus and F. Andrieu to be one and the same person"; Günther 2001: "[Magister Franciscus] may be the F. Andrieu..."; Strohm 2005, p. 53: "[F. Andrieu] may be the same man as Magister Franciscus"; Magnan 1993, p. 49: "[On the identification between Andrieu and Franciscus] this tenuous identification leads nowhere.") He may also be Franciscus de Goano (a papal choir chaplain; d. 1404) or the singer Johannes Franchois. Machaut was the most dominant and important composer of the 14th century, and Franciscus's works show many similarities to his, suggesting the two were contemporaries.

== Music ==
Only two of his works survive, the three-part ballades: De Narcissus and Phiton, Phiton, beste tres venimeuse. They are both contained in the Chantilly Codex. Reaney notes that Magister Franciscus's works are likely earlier than Andrieu's, between 1370 and 1376. Phiton, Phiton is dedicated to Gaston III of Foix and includes a musical quotation of Machaut's Phyton, le mervilleus (B38), a ballade written sometime after 1369.

== Works ==
List of compositions by Magister Franciscus
Title	No. of voices	Genre	Manuscript source: Folios	Apel	Greene
De Narcissus	3	Ballade	Chantilly Codex: 19v	A 26	G Vol 18: 16
Phiton, Phiton, beste tres venimeuse	3	Ballade	Chantilly Codex: 20v	A 27	G Vol 18: 18
No other works by Magister Franciscus survive (Note: If Magister Franciscus is identifiable with F. Andrieu, then Andrieu's compositions would be his as well.)

=== Editions ===
Franciscus's works are included in the following collections:

- Apel, Willi, ed. (1970–72). French Secular Compositions of the Fourteenth Century. Corpus mensurabilis musicae. Vol. 53. Cambridge, Massachusetts: American Institute of Musicology. ISBN 9780910956291. OCLC 311424615.
- Greene, Gordon K., ed. (1982). Manuscript Chantilly, Musée Condé 564 Part 1, nos. 1–50. Polyphonic Music of the Fourteenth Century. Vol. 18. Monaco: Éditions de l'Oiseau-Lyre. OCLC 181660103.

== Recordings ==
Recordings of music by Magister Franciscus
Year	Album	Performers	Piece	Label
1950 or before	Monuments of the Ars Nova, vol. 102	Various	De Narcissus	Oiseau-Lyre OL 102
1973	The Late 14th Century Avant Garde	Early Music Consort of London	Phiton, Phiton, beste tres venimeuse	EMI/HMV ASD 3621
