= A Ballade of Suicide =

Poem by G. K. Chesterton

"A Ballade of Suicide" is a ballade by G. K. Chesterton, originally published in his 1915 collection Poems.
