= Guido (composer) =

French composer (fl. 1372–1374)

Guido (fl. 1372–1374) was a French composer and cantor in the ars subtilior style of late medieval music. His only known music is contained in the Chantilly Codex.

== Identity and career ==
Not much is known for certain about Guido other than he was cantor at the Avignon Cathedral from 1372 through 1374. Scholars are certain that he was not the music theorist Guido frater who flourished during the early fourteenth century, but have speculated that he may be Guido de Lange, a Parisian cleric who was associated with the French cardinal Guillaume de la Jugié in 1362. There is an extant petition written by Guido de Lange on 9 November 1363 in which he refers to himself as rector of St Pierre-de-Montfort in the Roman Catholic Archdiocese of Rouen.

The only known music by Guido is contained within the Chantilly Codex. There are three musical works by Guido in this manuscript: a ballade, a rondeau, and a bitextual rondeau. These are written in the style of the ars subtilior in a manner reminiscent of Marchetto da Padova.
