= Deborah Sinnreich-Levi =

American scholar of medieval literature

Deborah Sinnreich-Levi is an American scholar of medieval literature who specializes in the work of the French 14th-century poet Eustache Deschamps and was called a "pioneer in the revival of interest in Deschamps", a poet who had long been neglected. Sinnreich-Levi received her B.A. from Queens College, City University of New York and her graduate degrees (Ph.D., M.A., M.Ph.) from Graduate Center, CUNY; her doctorate was granted in 1987. She attended the Summer Latin Workshop at University of California, Berkeley, in 1980. From 1990-2024, she taught at Stevens Institute of Technology. She continues to be the Vice President of TEAMS (Teaching Association for Medieval Studies), and Managing Editor of The Once and Future Classroom, TEAMS' on-line, peer-reviewed journal dedicated to all aspects of teaching medieval studies.

She edited and translated Deschamps' L’Art de dictier et de fere chancons, balades, virelais et rondeaulx, his treatise on verse.

== Selected bibliography ==
- Selected Poetry of Eustache Deschamps. Co-eds. and co-trs. I.S. Laurie, David Curzon, Jeffrey Fiskin. New York: Routledge, 2003.
- The Rhetorical Poetics of the Middle Ages: Reconstructive Polyphony: Essays in Honor of Robert O. Payne. Co-ed. John Hill. Fairleigh Dickinson University Press, 2000.
- The French and Occitan Middle Ages: Dictionary of Literary Biography Vol. 208. Co-ed. I.S. Laurie. Columbia, SC: Bruccoli, Clark Layman, Inc., 1999.
- Editor, Eustache Deschamps, French Courtier-Poet: His Work and His World. Intros. Stephen Nichols and Glending Olson. New York: AMS Press, 1998.
- Eustache Deschamps' L'Art de dictier. East Lansing, MI: Colleagues Press, 1994.
- Voices in Translation: The Authority of "Olde Bookes" in Medieval Literature: Essays in Honor of Helaine Newstead. Intros. Allen Mandelbaum and Frederick Goldin. Co-ed. Gale Sigal. New York: AMS Press, 1992.
