= Matheus de Sancto Johanne =

French composer

Matheus de Sancto Johanne (died after 10 June 1391), also known as Mayshuet, was a French composer of the late Medieval era. Active both in France and England, he was one of the representatives of the complex, manneristic musical style known as the ars subtilior which flourished around the court of the Avignon Papacy during the Great Schism.

== Life and career ==
Matheus was probably born in the diocese of Noyon, northeast of Paris. Nothing of his early life is known, nor is his age when he begins to appear in historical records. He worked in England from about 1366 as a clerk for the son-in-law of Edward III, and later for Philippa of Hainault, queen consort of Edward. In 1368 he came back to France. The next ten years are a blank, but at some time during this period he had begun working for Robert of Geneva, who later became Antipope Clement VII. In November 1378 – the same year Clement became pope – he is recorded as being a clerk for the Louis I, Duke of Anjou, and between 1382 and 1387 he was at the papal court in Avignon as a chaplain.

== Music ==
Six of his compositions have survived with reliable attribution. They include an unusual motet for five voices, Ave post libamina/Nunc surgunt (very few motets of the period have more than four voices), and five secular works: three ballades and two rondeaux. Two of the ballades, and one of the rondeaux, are for three voices, and these are later compositions more associated with the ars subtilior style; the others are four voices, and were possibly written earlier. That he was well-appreciated in England can be seen in late copies of his motet made there around 1430, for example, in the Old Hall Manuscript.

Two of his works are in the Codex "ModA" (Modena, Biblioteca Estense, α.M.5.24), but without attribution. The motet Ave post libamina is included in Corpus mensurabilis musicae, vol. 46 (1969).
