= Petrus de Goscalch =

Medieval Italian composer

Petrus de Goscalch (fl. 1378–94) was a composer from the papal choir at Avignon of whom only one composition, "En nul estat", survives in the Chantilly Codex, but who may be significant as the possible author of the third part of The Berkeley Treatise of 1375.

== Sources ==
- Günther, Ursula (2001). "Goscalch". Grove Music Online. Oxford: Oxford University Press. doi:10.1093/gmo/9781561592630.article.11496. ISBN 978-1-56159-263-0. (subscription, Wikilibrary access, or UK public library membership required)
