= Ars nova =

Musical style of the Late Middle Ages

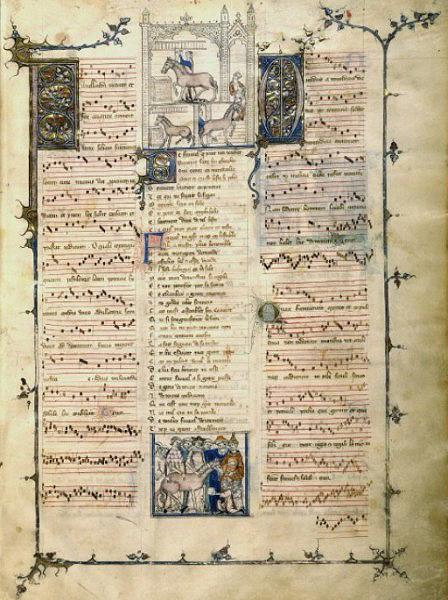
Page of the French manuscript Roman de Fauvel, Paris, B.N. Fr. 146 (c. 1318), "the first practical source of Ars nova music".

Ars nova (Latin for 'new art') is a musical style which flourished in the Kingdom of France and its surroundings during the Late Middle Ages. More particularly, it refers to the period between the preparation of the Roman de Fauvel (1310s) and the death of composer Guillaume de Machaut in 1377. The term is sometimes used more generally to refer to all European polyphonic music of the fourteenth century. For instance, the term "Italian ars nova" is sometimes used to denote the music of Francesco Landini and his compatriots, although Trecento music is the more common term for the contemporary 14th-century music in Italy. The "ars" in "ars nova" can be read as "technique", or "style". The term was first used in two musical treatises, titled Ars novae musicae (New Technique of Music) (c. 1320) by Johannes de Muris, and a collection of writings (c. 1322) attributed to Philippe de Vitry often simply called "Ars nova" today. Musicologist Johannes Wolf first applied to the term as description of an entire era (as opposed to merely specific persons) in 1904.

The term ars nova is often used in juxtaposition to two other periodic terms, of which the first, ars antiqua, refers to the music of the immediately preceding age, usually extending back to take in the period of Notre Dame polyphony (from about 1170 to 1320). Roughly, then, ars antiqua refers to music of the thirteenth century, and the ars nova that of the fourteenth; many music histories use the terms in this more general sense.

The period from the death of Machaut (1377) until the early fifteenth century, including the rhythmic innovations of the ars subtilior, is sometimes considered the end of, or late, ars nova but at other times an independent era in music. Other musical periods and styles have at various times been called "new art." Johannes Tinctoris used the term to describe Dunstaple; however, in modern historiographical usage, it is restricted entirely to the period described above.

== Versus ars antiqua ==
Stylistically, the music of the ars nova differed from the preceding era in several ways. Developments in notation allowed notes to be written with greater rhythmic independence, shunning the limitations of the rhythmic modes which prevailed in the thirteenth century; secular music acquired much of the polyphonic sophistication previously found only in sacred music; and new techniques and forms, such as isorhythm and the isorhythmic motet, became prevalent. The overall aesthetic effect of these changes was to create music of greater expressiveness and variety than had been the case in the thirteenth century. Indeed, the sudden historical change which occurred, with its startling new degree of musical expressiveness, can be likened to the introduction of perspective in painting, and it is useful to consider that the changes to music in the period of the ars nova were contemporary with the great early Renaissance revolutions in painting and literature.

The most famous practitioner of the new musical style was Guillaume de Machaut, who also had a distinguished career as a canon at Reims Cathedral and as a poet. The ars-nova style is evident in his considerable body of motets, lais, virelais, rondeaux and ballades.

Towards the end of the fourteenth century, a new stylistic school of composers and poets centered in Avignon in southern France developed; the highly mannered style of this period is often called the ars subtilior, although some scholars have chosen to consider it a late development of the ars nova rather than separating it into a separate school. This strange but interesting repertory of music, limited in geographical distribution (southern France, Aragon and later Cyprus), and clearly intended for performance by specialists for an audience of connoisseurs, is like an "end note" to the entire Middle Ages.

== List of composers ==
Composers of the ars nova style
Name	Lifetime	Works that survive	Ref(s)
Philippe de Vitry	1291–1361	Many works	
Jehan de Lescurel	fl. early 14th century	Many ballades and rondeaus; two "Diz entez"	
Guillaume de Machaut	c. 1300 – 1377	Substantial amount in various forms Notably Messe de Nostre Dame, Ma fin est mon commencement and Rose, liz, printemps, verdure	
P. des Molins	fl. mid 14th century	The ballade De ce que fol pensé and the rondeau Amis, tout dous vis	
Jehan Vaillant	fl. 1360–1390	Three rondeau a ballades and virelai Notably Par maintes foys	
Grimace	fl. mid-to-late 14th century	Three ballades, a virelai and rondeau Notably A l'arme A l'arme and Se Zephirus/Se Jupiter	
F. Andrieu	fl. late 14th century	The (double) ballade Armes amours	
Briquet	fl. early 15th century	The rondeau Ma seule amour et ma belle maistresse	

== Discography ==
- Chants du XIV^{ème} siècle. Mora Vocis Ensemble. France: Mandala, 1999. CD recording MAN 4946.
- Denkmäler alter Musik aus dem Codex Reina (14./15. Jh.). Syntagma Musicum (Kees Otten, dir.). Das Alte Werk. [N.p.]: Telefunken, 1979. LP recording 6.42357.
- Domna. Esther Lamandier, voice, harp, and portative organ. Paris: Alienor, 1987. CD recording AL 1019.
- La fontaine amoureuse: Poetry and Music of Guillaume de Machaut. Music for a While, with Tom Klunis, narrator. Berkeley: 1750 Arch Records, 1977. LP recording 1773.
- Guillaume de Machaut. Je, Guillaumes Dessus Nommez. Ensemble Gilles Binchois (Dominique Vellard, dir.). [N.p.]: Cantus, 2003. CD recording 9804.
- Guillaume de Machaut. La Messe de Nostre Dame und Motetten. James Bowman, Tom Sutcliffe, countertenors; Capella Antiqua München (Konrad Ruhland, dir.). Das Alte Werk. Hamburg: Telefunken, 1970. LP recording 6.41125 AS.
- Guillaume de Machaut. La messe de Nostre Dame; Le voir dit. Oxford Camerata (Jeremy Summerly, dir.). Hong Kong: Naxos, 2004. CD recording 8553833.
- Guillaume de Machaut. Messe de Notre Dame. Ensemble Organum (Marcel Pérès, dir.). Arles: Harmonia Mundi, 1997. CD recording 901590.
- Guillaume de Machaut. Messe de Notre Dame; Le lai de la fonteinne; Ma fin est mon commencement. Hilliard Ensemble (Paul Hillier, dir.). London: Hyperion, 1989.
- Guillaume de Machaut. Motets. Hilliard Ensemble. Munich: ECM Records, 2004.
- Philippe De Vitry and the Ars Nova—Motets. Orlando Consort. Wotton-Under-Edge, Glos., England: Amon Ra, 1990. CD recording CD-SAR 49.
- Philippe de Vitry. Motets & Chansons. Sequentia (Benjamin Bagby and Barbara Thornton, dir.) Freiburg: Deutsche Harmonia Mundi, 1991. CD recording 77095-2-RC.
- Roman de Fauvel. Jean Bollery (speaker), Studio der Frühen Musik (Thomas Binkley, dir.). Reflexe: Stationen europäischer Musik. Cologne: EMI, 1972. LP recording 1C 063-30 103.
- Le roman de Fauvel. Anne Azéma (soprano, narration), Dominique Visse (countertenor, narration), Boston Camerata and Ensemble Project Ars Nova (Joel Cohen, dir.). France: Erato, 1995. CD recording 4509-96392-2.
- The Service of Venus and Mars: Music for the Knights of the Garter, 1340–1440. Gothic Voices (Christopher Page, dir.). London: Hyperion, 1987. CD recording CDA 66238.
- The Spirit of England and France I: Music of the Late Middle Ages for Court and Church. Gothic Voices (Christopher Page, dir.). London: Hyperion Records, 1994. CD recording CDA66739.
- The Study of Love: French Songs and Motets of the 14th Century. Gothic Voices (Christopher Page, dir.). London: Hyperion Records, 1992. CD recording CDA66619.
