= Musica Nova (French ensemble) =

Formed in 2000, the Musica Nova ensemble unites singers and musicians under the artistic direction of singer and conductor Lucien Kandel. A passionate quest in search of emotion through music drives the group to produce a diverse musical programme. From the Middles Age to Baroque, Musica Nova departs into various musical periods and universes. The ensemble approaches its music with an eye for historical accuracy, through the use of original manuscripts. Working with the documents from the era is conducted with reflection upon the musical rules of the time (such as musica ficta and pronunciation) as well as the intended nuances of the pieces. The singers and musicians read their music in facsimile and their interpretation of it is thus inevitably modified. The result is a sound, a movement, a line, which makes Musica Nova so exceptionally rich and vibrant; the acoustic of which transports the listener; temporally and spiritually. The Musica Nova Ensemble appears on prestigious stages in France and all over the world. Recordings of their works are available, some of which have set the standard for current adaptations of the musical style.

== Discography ==
- Guillaume de Machaut - Motets (Zig-Zag Territoires)
- Guillaume Dufay - Flos Florum (Zig-Zag Territoires)
- Guillaume de Machaut - Ballades (Aeon Records)
- Johannes Ockeghem - Missa Cuisusvis Toni
- Guillaume de Machaut Messe Notre Dame
- Johannes Ockeghem Missa Prolationum
- Josquin Desprez Se congie prens Chansons profanes à 5 et 6 voix. (Raumklang)
