= Simone de' Prodenzani =

Italian poet

Simone de' Prodenzani (Orvieto, b. 1351? d. 1433–8), also spelled Prudenzani, was an Italian poet known for his narrative stories in the form of sonnets and ballades.

== Life ==
Prodenzani was a descendant of a French noble family from provençal who moved to Umbria in the thirteenth century, settling in the town of Prodo (from which his familial name comes). Prodenzani held important public offices in Orvieto.

== Works ==
Prodenzani's two most important works are Il Sollazzo which tells a series of popular folk tales as short stories and Il Saporetto (The little tastes) which speaks of bourgeois customs, including concerts and banquets, surrounding the main character Sollazzo, taken from the previous work. The descriptions of concerts and of the pieces performed at the concerts are particularly detailed and have furnished musicologists with information about performance practice and knowledge of repertory of the late fourteenth and early fifteenth century. Among the composers specifically mentioned are Jacopo da Bologna, Bartolino da Padova, Francesco il Cieco, Johannes Ciconia, and Antonio Zacara da Teramo.

Il Sollazzo and Il Saporetto were first published in modern editions in 1913 by Santorre Debenedetti, and have been republished several times since the late 1990s. Further poetic and prose works were edited in 2003.
