= Eustache Deschamps =

French poet (1346–1406/7)

Eustache Deschamps (French pronunciation: [østaʃ deʃɑ̃]; 1346 – 1406 or 1407) was a French poet, byname Morel, in French "Nightshade".

== Life and career ==
Deschamps was born in Vertus. He received lessons in versification from Guillaume de Machaut and later studied law at Orleans University. He then traveled through Europe as a diplomatic messenger for Charles V, being sent on missions to Bohemia, Hungary and Moravia. In 1372 he was made huissier d'armes to Charles. He received many other important offices, was bailli of Valois, and afterwards of Senlis, squire to the Dauphin, and governor of Fismes.

In 1380, Charles died, and Deschamps's estate was pillaged by the English, after which he often used the name "Brulé des Champs". In his childhood he had been an eyewitness of the English invasion of 1358, he had been present at the siege of Reims in 1360 and seen the march on Chartres, and he had witnessed the signing of the Treaty of Brétigny. In consequence he hated the English and continuously abused them in his many poems.

== Works ==
Deschamps wrote as many as 1,175 ballades, and he is sometimes credited with inventing the form. All but one of his poems are short, and they are mostly satirical, attacking the English, whom he regards as the plunderers of his country, and against the wealthy oppressors of the poor. His satires were also directed at corrupt officials and clergy but his sharp wit may have cost him his job as Bailli of Senlis.

He was the author of a treatise on French verse entitled L'Art de dictier et de fere chansons, balades, virelais et rondeaulx, completed on 25 November 1392. Besides giving rules for the composition of the kinds of verse mentioned in the title he enunciates some theories on poetry. He divides music into music proper and poetry. Music proper he calls artificial on the ground that everyone could by dint of study become a musician; poetry he calls natural because he says it is not an art that can be acquired but a gift. He stresses the harmony of verse, because, as was the fashion of his day, he practically took it for granted that all poetry was to be sung.

His one long poetic work, Le Miroir de Mariage, is a 12,103-line satirical poem on the subject of women. This work influenced Geoffrey Chaucer who used themes from the poem in his own work. Chaucer seems to be one of the few Englishmen Deschamps liked, as he composed a ballade in his honour (n. 285, probably written sometime after 1380) praising Chaucer as a great philosopher, translator, ethicist, and poet.

He also wrote about the decline in morals of his time, and also of the worsening state of affairs during the late Middle Ages, mentioning war, famine and disease.

Deschamps wrote two texts upon his teacher Machaut's death in 1377. They were combined and set to music into Armes, amours/O flour des flours (Weapons, loves/O flower of flowers), a double ballade for four voices by F. Andrieu. (Note: See F. Andrieu § Music for a lengthy discussion of the ballade, which includes commentary on Deschamps's poetry)

Deschamps translated Vitalis of Blois's Geta, a 12th-century Latin elegiac comedy, into French.

== Sources ==
- Boudet, Jean-Patrice, and Hélène Millet (eds.). 1997. Eustache Deschamps et son temps. Textes et Documents d'Histoire Médiévale 1. Paris: Publications de la Sorbonne.
- Deschamps, Eustache. 1878–1903 Oeuvres complètes de Eustache Deschamps, edited by Gaston Raynaud and Henri Auguste Edouard, le marquis de Queux de Sainte-Hilaire. 11 vols. Paris: Firmin-Didot. Reprinted, New York: Johnson Reprint, 1966.
- Deschamps, Eustache. 1994. Eustache Deschamps' L'Art de dictier, edited and translated by Deborah M. Sinnreich-Levi. East Lansing, MI: Colleagues Press.
- Deschamps, Eustache. 2003. Selected Poetry of Eustache Deschamps, edited and translated by I.S. Laurie, Deborah M. Sinnreich-Levi, David Curzon, and Jeffrey Fiskin. New York: Routledge.
- Hoepffner, Ernst. 1904. Eustache Deschamps: Leben und Werke. Diss. Strassburg. Strassburg: Karl J. Trübner. Reprinted, Geneva: Slatkine, 1974.
- Huot, Sylvia. 1999. [Untitled review of Boudet and Millet 1997]. Speculum 74, n. 3 (July): 699–700.
- Kendrick, Laura. 1983. "Rhetoric and the Rise of Public Poetry: The Career of Eustache Deschamps". Studies in Philology 80, n. 1 (Winter): 1–13.
- Kendrick, Laura (2014). "Medieval Vernacular Versions of Ancient Comedy: Geoffrey Chaucer, Eustache Deschamps, Vitalis of Blois and Plautus' Amphitryon". In S. Douglas Olson (ed.). Ancient Comedy and Reception: Essays in Honor of Jeffrey Henderson. De Gruyter. pp. 377–396.
- Reaney, Gilbert (2001). "Andrieu, F.". Grove Music Online. Oxford: Oxford University Press. doi:10.1093/gmo/9781561592630.article.00904. (subscription, Wikilibrary access, or UK public library membership required)
- Sinnreich-Levi, Deborah (ed.). 1998. Eustache Deschamps, French Courtier-Poet: His Work and His World, with introductions by Stephen Nichols and Glending Olson. New York: AMS Press, 1998.
