= Johannes Symonis Hasprois =

Medieval French composer

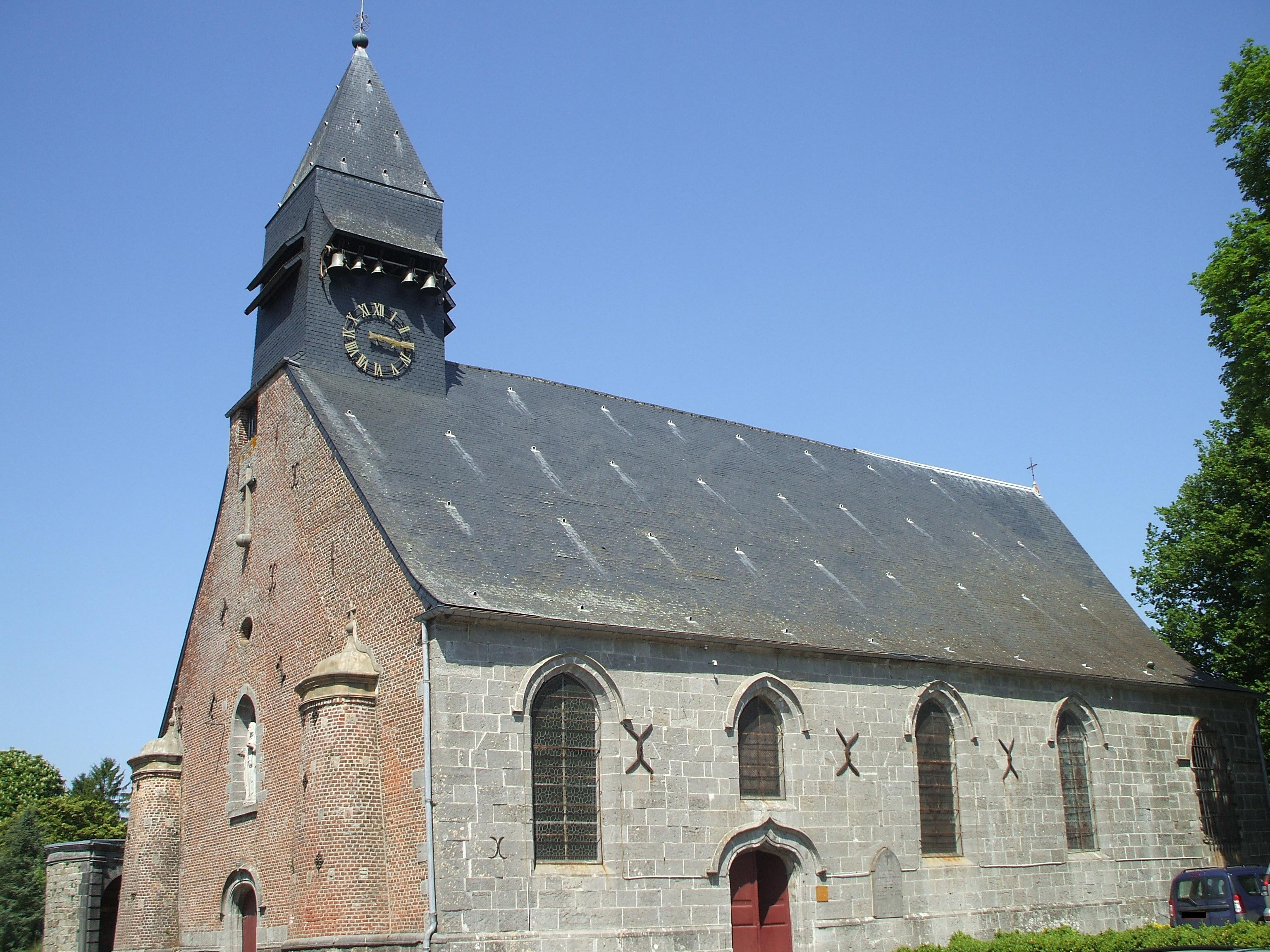
The church of Saint Hiltrude at Liessies was Hasprois's parish church from 1388 until 1390.

Johannes Symonis (Jehan Simon) Hasprois (died 1428) was a French composer originally from Arras. Four of his works of music survive in four different manuscripts, and he may also have written a treatise on astrology.

== Career ==
Hasprois led an itinerant life. His career began in royal courts. In 1378, in our earliest record of him, he was serving at the court of Ferdinand I of Portugal, but by 1380 he was at the court of Charles V of France. His career afterwards was in the church. In 1384 he was the petit vicaire (lesser vicar) of Cambrai Cathedral, and in the same diocese he obtained the rectorate of the parish church of Liessies, probably in 1388. He also held benefices at Arras, Rozoy in the Aisne département and Cambrai Cathedral. He left his parish between August 1390 and 1393 and went to serve as a private chaplain to Pope Clement VII at the Papal chapel at Avignon. As his name always precedes that of Johannes de Bosco, who became a chaplain in 1391, in the registers, it is likely that he was appointed chaplain earlier than 1391. Hasprois continued to serve under Benedict XIII down to 1403. He was possibly the same person as the magister Johannes Symonis who attended the Council of Constance in 1417 and wrote an essay on astrology. Hasprois served in the Roman Curia as an apostolic notary until his death in 1428.

== Music ==
Hasprois's early two-voice ballade "Puisque je sui fumeux" is "a prime example of the exceedingly complex style of the ars subtilior." The text of this ballade is also preserved anonymously as "Balade de maistre fumeux". It is similar to a rondeau by Solage, "Fumeux fume par fumee", and both were probably written for the "highly eccentric circle" gathered around Jean Fumée. If so, then it probably dates to the time when Hasprois was at the court of Charles V.

Hasprois wrote two other ballades in the tradition of courtly love as it was being expressed circa 1400. "Ma doulce amour" is preserved in three manuscripts and is the more complicated of the two. The syllabic "Se mes deux yeux" is found in only one manuscript, alongside "Ma doulce". There is also an incomplete rondeau refrain, "Jone, gente, joyeuse", with a tenor part lacking a text, ascribed to Hasprois in one manuscript.

Modern scholars have suggested several anonymous compositions as having possibly been composed by Hasprois: three from the manuscript GB-Ob 213, based on style, and two songs from the so-called "Leiden fragments", because his name appears in their texts. One of these, the drinking song "Ho, ho, ho", is in the simpler early 15th-century style of Hasprois's two later ballades.

== Sources ==
- Günther, Ursula (2001). "Hasprois [Asproys, de Haspre, de Haspra, de Aspre, Haprose], Johannes Symonis". Grove Music Online. Oxford: Oxford University Press. doi:10.1093/gmo/9781561592630.article.12511. ISBN 978-1-56159-263-0. (subscription, Wikilibrary access, or UK public library membership required)
