= Trebor (composer) =

14th century musical composer

Trebor was a 14th-century composer of polyphonic chansons, active in Navarre and other southwest European courts c. 1380–1400. He may be the same person also called Triboll, Trebol, and Borlet in other contemporaneous sources. His name is possibly an anadrome of Robert.

== Music ==
His compositions are associated with the style known as ars subtilior, and six of his works survive in one of the most important surviving manuscripts of ars subtilior music, the Chantilly Codex. Some of his pieces explicitly reference historical events such as the Aragonese conquest of Sardinia in 1388-89 and the reign of Gaston Febus, the count of Foix. His music was well known to Avignonese composers of the time, such as Grimace and F. Andrieu, who quoted some of his pieces in their works. He is noted for his use of displacement syncopation and sustained chords, the former of which is one of the hallmark devices of ars subtilior.

The compositions attributed to Trebor, most of them in the Chantilly Codex, are:

- En seumeillant m’avint une vision
- Se July Cesar, Rolant et roy Artus
- Se Alixandre et Hector fussent en vie
- Quant joyne cuer en may est amoureux
- He, tres doulz roussignol joly – also attributed to Borlet
- Passerose de beaute
- Helas! pitie envers moy dort si fort

== See also ==
- Borlet
