= Arts de seconde rhétorique =

The term la seconde rhétorique (French for "second rhetoric") came into use in the fifteenth century as a description of secular, vernacular verse in France. The term embodied these three characteristics in opposition to (i) la première rhétorique, that is, prose; (ii) to writing in medieval Latin; and (iii) to the writings of the clergy (clercs). The earliest vernacular treatise on poetry in France was the prologue written by Guillaume de Machaut for publication of his complete works (1370s), but the earliest that is one of the traditional Arts de seconde rhétorique is L'art de dictier by Eustache Deschamps (1392). Several examples of Arts de la seconde rhétorique followed:

- Des rimes by Jacques Legrand (1405)
- Les règles de la seconde rhétorique (1411–32)
- Le doctrinal de la seconde rhétorique by Baudet Harenc (1432)
- Traité de l'art de rhétorique (1450?)
- L'art de rhétorique by Jean Molinet (1493)
- Traité de rhétorique (1495–1500)
- L'art et science de rhétorique vulgaire (1524–25)

Most of the surviving treatises of the "second rhetoric" are found in single manuscripts, although there is evidence of borrowing between them and of common models. Some may have been drawn up for the use of judges at poetry competitions, puys d'amour, while others are clearly designed for the use of noble patrons.

== Edition ==
- E. Langlois, ed.: Recueil d'arts de seconde rhétorique (Paris, 1902) (full text)

== Sources ==
- Ardis T. B. Butterfield. "Arts de seconde rhétorique". Medieval France: An Encyclopedia. William W. Kibler and Grover A. Zinn, eds. Psychology Press, 1995.
- Marijke Spies, H. Duits, A. van Strien. Rhetoric, Rhetoricians, and Poets: Studies in Renaissance Poetry and Poetics. Amsterdam University Press, 1999.
