= Johannes Susay =

Medieval French composer

Jo[hannes] Susay or Jehan Suzay (sometimes written Suzoy or Susoy) (fl. c. 1380; d. after 1411) was a French composer of the Middle Ages. He is the composer of three ballades in the ars subtilior style, all found in the Chantilly Codex: A l'albre sec, Prophilias, un des nobles, and Pictagoras, Jabol et Orpheus. The last ballade is also found in the Boverio Codex, Turin T.III.2, with the more accurate incipit "Pytagoras, Jobal, et Orpheus" . A a three-voice Gloria "in fauxbourdon-like style" found in the Apt codex (ff. 25v/26r) is also attributed to Susay.

Susay's secular works have been edited in Willi Apel, French Secular Music of the Fourteenth Century and Gordon Greene, Polyphonic Music of the Fourteenth Century, volumes 18 and 19, and his Gloria by Stäblein-Harder and Cattin/Facchin.

According to the anonymous, early-fifteenth century treatise, Règles de la seconde rhétorique, the poet Jehan de Suzay (named along with Tapissier and others) was still alive at the time of writing. He is generally supposed to be this composer.
