= Johannes Cuvelier =

14th-century composer

Johannes Cuvelier (fl c. 1372–d. after 1387) was a composer of the ars subtilior, whose surviving works are preserved in the Chantilly Codex. He was possibly born in Tournai and worked at the court of Charles V.

His most important work is the poem La Chanson de Bertrand du Guesclin, a tribute to the Breton military commander Bertrand du Guesclin. He also has four works in the Chantilly Codex:

- Se Galaas et le puissant Artus
- Onques Arthur, Alixandre et Paris
- Se Genevre, Tristan, Yssout, Helaine
- En la saison que toute riens encline

== Editions ==
- The Song of Bertrand du Guesclin, ed. and trans. Nigel Bryant, Boydell and Brewer, 2019.
