= Rondeau (forme fixe) =

French medieval and Renaissance poetic and musical genre

A rondeau (French: [ʁɔ̃do]; plural: rondeaux) is a form of medieval and Renaissance French poetry, as well as the corresponding musical chanson form. Together with the ballade and the virelai it was considered one of three formes fixes, and one of the verse forms in France most commonly set to music between the late 13th and the 15th centuries. It is structured around a fixed pattern of repetition of verse with a refrain. The rondeau is believed to have originated in dance songs involving singing of the refrain by a group alternating with the other lines by a soloist. The term "Rondeau" is used both in a wider sense, covering older styles of the form which are sometimes distinguished as the triolet and rondel, and in a narrower sense referring to a 15-line style which developed from these forms in the 15th and 16th centuries. The rondeau is unrelated to the much later instrumental dance form that shares the same name in French baroque music, which is more commonly called the rondo form in classical music.

== Verse structure ==
Structural plan of 14th century rondel/rondeau forms

The older French rondeau or rondel as a song form between the 13th and mid-15th century begins with a full statement of its refrain, which consists of two halves. This is followed first by a section of non-refrain material that mirrors the metrical structure and rhyme of the refrain's first half, then by a repetition of the first half of the refrain, then by a new section corresponding to the structure of the full refrain, and finally by a full restatement of the refrain. Thus, it can be schematically represented as $\mathrm{AB \,\, aAab \,\, AB}$, where $\mathrm{A}$ and $\mathrm{B}$ are the repeated refrain parts, and $\mathrm{a}$ and $\mathrm{b}$ the remaining verses. If the poem has more than one stanza, it continues with further sequences of $\mathrm{aAab \,\, AB}$, $\mathrm{aAab \,\, AB}$, etc.

In its simplest and shortest form, the rondeau simple, each of the structural parts is a single verse, leading to the eight-line structure known today as triolet, as shown in "Doulz viaire gracieus" by Guillaume de Machaut:

Doulz viaire gracieus,
de fin cuer vous ay servi.
Weillies moy estre piteus,
Doulz viaire gracieus,
Se je sui un po honteus,
ne me mettes en oubli:
Doulz viaire gracieus,
de fin cuer vous ay servi.

A
B
a
A
a
b
A
B

Sweet gracious face,
I have served you with a sincere heart.
If you will have pity on me,
sweet gracious face,
then if I am a bit shy,
do not embarrass me:
Sweet gracious face,
I have served you with a sincere heart.

In larger rondeau variants, each of the structural sections may consist of several verses, although the overall sequence of sections remains the same. Variants include the rondeau tercet, where the refrain consists of three verses, the rondeau quatrain, where it consists of four (and, accordingly, the whole form of sixteen), and the rondeau cinquain, with a refrain of five verses (and a total length of 21), which becomes the norm in the 15th century. In the rondeau quatrain, the rhyme scheme is usually $\mathrm{ABBA \,\, ab \,\, AB \,\, abba \,\, ABBA}$; in the rondeau cinquain it is$\mathrm{AABBA \,\, aab \,\, AAB \,\, aabba \,\, AABBA}$.

A typical example of a rondeau cinquain of the 15th century is the following:

Allés, Regrez, vuidez de ma presence;
allés ailleurs querir vostre acointance;
assés avés tourmenté mon las cueur,
rempli de deuil pour estre serviteur
d'une sans per que j'ay aymée d'enfance.

Fait lui avés longuement ceste offence,
Ou est celluy qui onc fut ne en France,
qui endurast tel mortel deshonneur?

Allés, Regrez, …

N'y tournés plus, car, par ma conscience,
se plus vous voy prochain de ma plaisance,
devant chascun vous feray tel honneur
que l'on dira que la main d'ung seigneur
vous a bien mis a la malle meschance.

Allés, Regrez, …

Structural plan of the literary 13-line rondel and 15-line rondeau of the later Renaissance.

In the medieval manuscripts, the restatement of the refrain is usually not written out, but only indicated by giving the first words or first line of the refrain part. After the mid-15th century, this feature came to be regarded no longer as a mere scribal abbreviation, but as an actual part of the poetry. As the form was gradually divorced from the musical structure and became a purely literary genre, it is often not entirely clear how much of the refrain material was actually meant to be repeated. A rondeau quatrain in which the first refrain interjection (lines 7–8, rhymes $\mathrm{AB}$) is preserved in full, while the final restatement of the refrain is reduced to a single line ($\mathrm{A}$) or again just two lines ($\mathrm{AB}$), ends up with a total of 13 or 14 lines respectively. This form is usually defined as the "rondel" in modern literary compendia.

Another version has the refrains shortened even further. Both restatements are reduced to just the first two or three words of the first line, which now stand as short, pithy, non-rhyming lines in the middle and at the end of the poem. These half-lines are called rentrement. If derived from the erstwhile rondeau quatrain, this results in a 12-line structure that is now called the "rondeau prime", with the rentrements in lines 7 and 12. If derived from the erstwhile 21-line rondeau cinquain, the result is a 15-line form with the rentrements in lines 9 and 15 (rhyme scheme $\mathrm{aabba}$–$\mathrm{aabR}$–$\mathrm{aabbaR}$). This 15-line form became the norm in the literary rondeau of the later Renaissance, and is known as the "rondeau" proper today. The following is a typical example of this form:

Avant mes jours mort me fault encourir,
Par un regard dont m'as voulu ferir,
Et ne te chault de ma grefve tristesse;
Mais n'est ce pas à toy grande rudesse,
Veu que to peulx si bien me secourir?

Auprés de l'eau me fault de soif perir;
Je me voy jeune, et en aage fleurir,
Et si me monstre estre plein de vieillesse

Avant mes jours.

Or, si je meurs, je veulx Dieu requerir
Prendre mon ame, et sans plus enquerir,
Je donne aux vers mon corps plein de foiblesse;
Quant est du cueur, du tout je te le laisse,
Ce nonobstant que me faces mourir

Avant mes jours.

A large corpus of medieval French rondeaux was collected, catalogued, and studied by Nico H.J. van den Boogaard in his dissertation Rondeaux et refrains du XIIe siècle au début du XIVe: Collationnement, introduction et notes (Paris: Klincksieck, 1969).

== Musical form ==
Machaut, "Doulz viaire gracieus", a typical Rondeau setting of the 14th-century Ars nova. MIDI rendering

Like the other formes fixes, the Rondeau (in its original form with full refrains) was frequently set to music. The earliest surviving polyphonic rondeaux are by the trouvère Adam de la Halle in the late 13th century. In the 14th and 15th centuries, Guillaume de Machaut, Guillaume Dufay, Hayne van Ghizeghem and other prominent composers were prolific in the form. Early rondeaux are usually found as interpolations in longer narrative poems, and separate monophonic musical settings survive. After the 15th century, the musical form went out of fashion and the rondeau became a purely literary form.

The musical rondeau is typically a two-part composition, with all the "$\mathrm{A}$" sections of the poem's $\mathrm{AB}$-$\mathrm{aAab}$-$\mathrm{AB}$ structure set to one line of music, and all the "$\mathrm{B}$" parts to another.

Although far rarer than the French usage, the Italian equivalent, the rondello was occasionally composed and listed among the Italian forms of poetry for music. A single rondello appears in the Rossi Codex. In addition, several rondeaux in French appear entirely in sources originating in Italy, the Low Countries, and Germany, suggesting that these works (including Esperance, qui en mon cuer) may not have a purely French provenance.

Later, in the Baroque era, the label rondeau (or the adjectival phrase en rondeau) was applied to dance movements in simple refrain form by such composers as Jean-Baptiste Lully and Louis Couperin.

Arnold Schoenberg's Pierrot Lunaire sets 21 poems by Albert Giraud, each of which is a 13-line poetic rondeau.

== English rondeau ==
The French rondeau forms have been adapted to English at various times by different poets. Geoffrey Chaucer wrote two rondeaus in the rondeau tercet form, one of them at the end of The Parliament of Fowls, where the birds are said to "synge a roundel" to a melody "imaked in Fraunce":

Now welcome, somer, with thy sonne softe,
That hast thes wintres wedres overshake,
And driven away the longe nyghtes blake!

Saynt Valentyn, that art ful hy on-lofte,
Thus syngen smale foules for they sake:

Now welcome, somer, with thy sonne softe,
That hast thes wintres wedres overshake,

Wel han they cause for to gladen ofte,
Sith ech of hem recovered hath hys make,
Ful blissful mowe they synge when they wake:

Now welcome, somer, with thy sonne softe,
That hast thes wintres wedres overshake,
And driven away the longe nyghtes blake!

In its classical 16th-century 15-line form with a rentrement (aabba–aabR–aabbaR), the rondeau was used by Thomas Wyatt. Later, it was reintroduced by some late 19th-century and 20th-century poets, such as Paul Laurence Dunbar ("We Wear the Mask"). It was customarily regarded as a challenge to arrange for these refrains to contribute to the meaning of the poem in as succinct and poignant a manner as possible. Perhaps the best-known English rondeau is the World War I poem, In Flanders Fields by Canadian John McCrae:

In Flanders fields the poppies blow
Between the crosses, row on row,
That mark our place; and in the sky,
The larks, still bravely singing, fly,
Scarce heard amid the guns below.

We are the dead; short days ago
We lived, felt dawn, saw sunset glow,
Loved and were loved, and now we lie

In Flanders fields.

Take up our quarrel with the foe!
To you from failing hands we throw
The torch; be yours to hold it high!
If ye break faith with us who die
We shall not sleep, though poppies grow

In Flanders fields.

== Rondeau redoublé ==
A more complex form is the rondeau redoublé. This is also written on two rhymes, but in five stanzas of four lines each and one of five lines. Each of the first four lines (stanza 1) get individually repeated in turn once by becoming successively the respective fourth lines of stanzas 2, 3, 4, & 5; and the first part of the first line is repeated as a short fifth line to conclude the sixth stanza. This can be represented as - $\mathrm{A_1,B_1,A_2,B_2}$ - $\mathrm{b,a,b,A_1}$ - $\mathrm{a,b,a,B_1}$ - $\mathrm{b,a,b,A_2}$ - $\mathrm{a,b,a,B_2}$ - $\mathrm{b,a,b,a,(A_1)}$.

The following example of the form was written from the point of view of one of the RAF officers carrying the coffin of Diana, Princess of Wales to the plane that was to carry it to England.

Guard of Honour
by Paul Hansford

The burden I bear is more heavy than lead.
The physical weight is a thing that I share,
but the loss that I feel will not leave my head.
Why did you have to die? Why is death so unfair?

I am close to you now. Yes, touching my hair
the flag with its lions of gold and of red
that wraps round your coffin. I know you are there.
The burden I bear is more heavy than lead.

My comrades move with me in slow, solemn tread.
Our eyes are all fixed in an unseeing stare.
Our shoulders support you in your oaken bed.
The physical weight is a thing that I share.

As I feel the world watching I try not to care.
My deepest emotions are best left unsaid.
Let others show grief like a garment they wear,
but the loss that I feel will not leave my head.

The flowers they leave like a carpet are spread,
In the books of remembrance they have written, "Somewhere
a star is extinguished because you are dead.
Why did you have to die? Why is death so unfair?"

The tears that we weep will soon grow more rare,
the rawness of grief turn to memory instead.
But deep in our hearts you will always be there,
and I ask, will I ever be able to shed
the burden I bear?

== See also ==
- Rondel
- Roundel
- Rondo
