= Ballade (forme fixe) =

Form of medieval and Renaissance French poetry

Se la face ay pale,
La cause est amer,
C'est la principale
Et tant m'est amer
Amer, qu'en la mer
Me voudroye voir;
Or, scet bien de voir
La belle a qui suis
Que nul bien avoir
Sans elle ne puis.

Se ay pesante male
De dueil a porter,
Ceste amour est male
Pour moy de porter;
Car soy deporter
Ne veult devouloir,
Fors qu'a son vouloir
Obeisse, et puis
Qu'elle a tel pouvoir,
Sans elle ne puis.

C'est la plus reale
Qu'on puist regarder,
De s'amour leiale
Ne me puis guarder,
Fol sui de agarder
Ne faire devoir
D'amours recevoir
Fors d'elle, je cuij;
Se ne veil douloir,
Sans elle ne puis.

— Guillaume Dufay

The ballade (/bəˈlɑːd/; French: [balad]; not to be confused with the ballad) is a form of medieval and Renaissance French poetry as well as the corresponding musical chanson form. It was one of the three formes fixes (the other two were the rondeau and the virelai) and one of the verse forms in France most commonly set to music between the late 13th and the 15th centuries.

The formes fixes were standard forms in French-texted song of the fourteenth and fifteenth centuries. The ballade is usually in three stanzas, each ending with a refrain (a repeated segment of text and music).

The ballade as a verse form typically consists of three eight-line stanzas, each with a consistent metre and a particular rhyme scheme. The last line in the stanza is a refrain. The stanzas are often followed by a four-line concluding stanza (an envoi) usually addressed to a prince. The rhyme scheme is therefore usually $\mathrm{ababbcbC \,\, ababbcbC \,\, ababbcbC}$, where the capital $\mathrm{C}$ is a refrain.

The many different rhyming words that are needed (the $\mathrm{b}$ rhyme needs at least fourteen words) makes the form more difficult for English than for French poets. Geoffrey Chaucer wrote in the form. It was revived in the 19th century by English-language poets including Dante Gabriel Rossetti and Algernon Charles Swinburne. Other notable English-language ballade writers are Andrew Lang, Hilaire Belloc and G. K. Chesterton (at Wikisource). A humorous example is Wendy Cope's Proverbial Ballade; another, by T. S. Eliot and satirising literary critics in a way akin to Catullus' Carmen 16, is entitled Triumph of Bullshit.

== Musical form ==
Schematic representation of a ballade stanza

Balladelle stanza

Cantus voice of Machaut's "Honte, paour, doubtance". Note the musical rhyme between the clos of part A (m.15–18) and the end of the refrain (m.27–29). MIDI rendering.

The musical form of a ballade stanza is a bar form ($\mathrm{AAB}$), with a first, repeated musical section (stollen) setting the two initial pairs of verses (rhyme scheme $\mathrm{ab \,\, ab}$), and the second section (abgesang) setting the remaining lines including the refrain verse ($\mathrm{bcbC}$). The two statements of the "$\mathrm{A}$" section often have different endings, known as "ouvert" and "clos" respectively, with the harmony of the "ouvert" ending leading back to the beginning and that of the "clos" ending leading forward into the "$\mathrm{B}$" section. In many ballades, the final part of the "$\mathrm{B}$" section may reintroduce melodic material referring back to the end of the $\mathrm{A}$ part, a feature known as "musical rhyme" (or, in German, Rücklaufballade). An alternative form employed by Machaut, known as ballade duplex or balladelle, has the $\mathrm{B}$ part also divided into two repetitions, with the refrain line sung as part of the repetition.

A famous exception to the normal form is "Se la face ay pale" by Guillaume Dufay, where the entire stanza is through-composed, i.e. without a repetition between the two "$\mathrm{A}$" sections.

== Notable writers of ballades ==
Guillaume de Machaut wrote 42 ballades set to music. A few of them set two or even three poems to music simultaneously, with different texts sung in different voices. Most of the others have a single texted voice with either one or two untexted (instrumental) accompanying voices. One of the most notable writers of ballades in the 15th century was François Villon.

== Variations ==
There are many easy-to-identify variations to the ballade; it is in many ways similar to the ode and chant royal. Some ballades have five stanzas. A seven-line ballade, or ballade royal, consists of four stanzas of rhyme royal, all using the same three rhymes, all ending in a refrain, without an envoi.

A ballade supreme has ten-line stanzas rhyming $\mathrm{ababbccdcD}$, with the envoi $\mathrm{ccdcD \,\, ccdccD}$. An example is Ballade des Pendus by François Villon. There are also instances of a double ballade and double-refrain ballade.
