= Johannes Cesaris =

French composer

Johannes Cesaris (fl. 1406 – 1417) was a French composer of the late Medieval era and early Renaissance. He was one of the composers of the transitional style between the two epochs, and was active at the Burgundian court in the early 15th century.

== Life and career ==
Little is known about his life, excepting the years he was active in Bourges. He was a cleric for the Duke of Berry in Bourges in 1406, and maître des enfants (choirmaster to the boys) at the cathedral there from 1407 to 1409. In 1417 he was probably the organist at Angers cathedral. A Pierre Cesaris, possibly a relative, was active in Bourges until 1443. There is a reference in a contemporary poem, Le champion des dames by Martin le Franc to Johannes Cesaris being a popular composer in Paris in the early part of the century (this is the same manuscript that contains the famous portraits of Guillaume Dufay and Gilles Binchois).

== Music ==
Of his works, one motet, two ballades, and five rondeaux survive, as well as a sixth rondeau which has a contested attribution (it may be by Passet). Stylistically, they span both the manneristic complexities of the ars subtilior, which was the predominant style in Avignon in the 1390s, and the relatively simple song style of the early 15th century as it was developing in the courts of France and Burgundy. His motet A virtutis ignitio/Ergo beata/Benedicta filia, for four voices with three simultaneously sung texts, is isorhythmic in all parts. One of the secular songs, the rondeau A l'aventure va Gauvain, is in a style which suggests the later generation, and may have been written later than 1417; indeed many of his pieces are from manuscripts dated from early to mid-century.

One of his pieces, the ballade Le dieus d'amours, was copied into the famous Chantilly Codex, the illuminated manuscript which is the primary source for the Avignon repertory of the ars subtilior.

Tapissier is among the musicians mentioned by Martin le Franc in his long poem, Le Champion des dames:

Tapissier, Carmen, Cesaris,
N'a pas longtemps si bien chanterrent
Qu'ilz esbahirent tout Paris

(Tapissier, Carmen, and Cesaris
Not long ago they did sing so well,
That they astonished all of Paris)

Cesaris seems to have been mostly forgotten before the 20th-century; in 1866, the musicologist François-Joseph Fétis remarked that the names Tapissier, Carmen and Cesaris were unknown to music scholars.

== Editions ==
Cesaris's works are included in the following collections:

- Reaney, Gilbert, ed. (1955). Early Fifteenth-Century Music. Corpus mensurabilis musicae 11. Vol. 1, Works of Baude Cordier, Johannis Cesaris, Johannis Carmen, Johannis Tapissier. Cambridge: American Institute of Musicology. OCLC 83198152.

== Recording ==
- Arnold de Lantins, Missa Verbum Incarnatum, Ricercar CD RIC 207, sung by the Capilla Flamenca Psallentes. Contains the motet A virtutis ignitio by Cesaris, as well as music by Arnold de Lantins and Johannes Brassart.
- Gothic Voices, Christopher Page, Lancaster & Valois: French & Engl Music 1350-1420, Hyperion Records CDH55294. Contains 2 rondeaux Se vous scaviez, ma tres douce maistresse and Mon seul voloir/Certes m’amour by Cesaris.
