= Gilles Binchois =

Franco-Flemish Renaissance composer (c. 1400–1460)

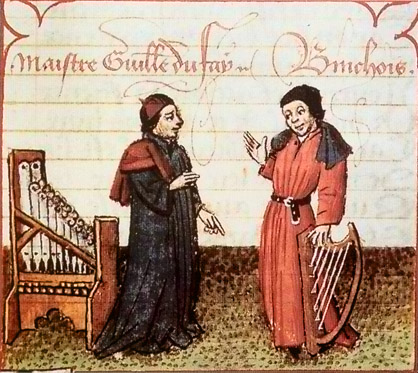
Binchois (right) holding a small harp and Guillaume Du Fay (left) beside a portative organ in a c. 1440 Illuminated manuscript copy of Martin le Franc's Le champion des dames (Note: This illustration is the only certain depiction of Binchois, and may not even be an accurate likeness.)

Gilles de Bins dit Binchois (also Binchoys; c. 1400 – 20 September 1460) was a Franco-Flemish composer and singer of early Renaissance music. A central figure of the Burgundian School, Binchois is a renowned melodist and miniaturist; he generally avoided large scale works, and is most admired for his shorter secular chansons. Contemporary musicologists generally rank his importance below his colleague Guillaume Du Fay and the English composer John Dunstaple, but together the three were the most celebrated composers of the early European Renaissance.

Binchois was born in Mons (modern-day Belgium) to an upper-class family from Binche. His youth is largely unknown, although early chorister training is likely; by late 1419 he had obtained a local organist post. By 1423 he was in Lille and probably a soldier under the Englishman William de la Pole, eventually in Paris and Hainaut. Sometime during the 1420s, Binchois settled in the culturally thriving court of Burgundy under Philip the Good, where he became a subdeacon and was awarded numerous prebends. He retired to Soignies in 1453 amid a substantial courtly pension, dying in 1460.

It is thought that considerably more of his sacred music survives than secular music, creating a "paradoxical image" of the composer. Reflecting on his style, the Encyclopædia Britannica comments that "Binchois cultivated the gently subtle rhythm, the suavely graceful melody, and the smooth treatment of dissonance of his English contemporaries".

== Life ==
=== Early life ===
The composer's full name is Gilles de Bins dit Binchois, consisting of the byname 'Gilles de Binche' (also spelled 'Gilles de Bins') and the dit name Binchois (also spelled 'Binchoys'). (Note: The composers dit name is usually spelled Binchois or Binchoys; however, early manuscripts transmit a variety of alternative spellings. These include Binchis, Binchoy, Bincoys, Bynczoys, Bynzoys, Prachoys, Vinczois and Wintzois.) Obituary records from St Vincent, Soignies name his parents as Johannes and Johanna de Binche, usually identified with Jean de Binch (d. 1425?) and his wife Jeanne, née Paulouche (d. 1426?). His parents were of the upper class in Mons and probably from the town of Binche; his father was a councillor to Duke William IV of Hainault and later Jacqueline, Countess of Hainaut. The elder Binchois was also a councillor for the Ste Waudru church of Mons, and built a chapel for the St Germain church. Their son Gilles Binchois was probably born in Mons c. 1400, then in the County of Hainaut, the same city in which the composer Orlande de Lassus would be born a century later. There is no documentary evidence that Binchois was born in the town of Binche, a few miles from Mons, as is sometimes assumed.

Nothing for certain is known about Binchois until 8 December 1419, when he is known to have been the organist at Ste Waudru in Mons. It is possible that Gilles Binchois received an early musical education near the court of Mons, and like other composers of his time, he probably trained as a chorister in his youth, perhaps at St Germain. An account from Jules Houdoy (1880) which refers to the chorister Jean de Binche at Cambrai Cathedral has often been misinterpreted as referring to Binchois. There is no evidence that Binchois was a chorister at Cambrai in his youth. From what is known, he never received an academic degree of any kind.

Records from 28 July 1423 indicates that he soon moved to Lille. Around this time he may have been a soldier, as indicated by a line in the funeral motet Deploration for Binchois, composed in his memory by the composer Johannes Ockeghem. Binchois might have served under the Englishman William de la Pole, 1st Duke of Suffolk, who was in France for the Hundred Years' War; Binchois is assumed to have been in Paris, alongside the composer Estienne Grossin. This association is evidenced by a 1426 document which records that the Duke of Suffolk commissioned the otherwise unknown rondel Ainsi que a la foiz m’y souvient from a 'Binchoiz'. At some point Binchois went with William to Hainaut.

=== Burgundian court ===
Sometime during the late 1420s Binchois joined the court chapel choir of Burgundy; the exact date is unknown due to chapel's lost employment records from 1419 to 1436. A 1427 disposition from Guillaume Benoit which includes Binchois' name suggests he was there by then, though this is uncertain. He was certainly in the chapel when he wrote the motet Nove cantum melodie—one of his only datable compositions—on 18 January 1431, as it was for the baptism of Anthony, bastard of Burgundy; the motet's text names Binchois alongside the composer Pierre Fontaine. The musicologist David Fallows notes that "he must have been there some years earlier since the list of 1436 places him as fifth chaplain in order of seniority within the choir". The Burgundian court under Philip the Good was perhaps the most lively and prominent court of the area; its members compared it to that of Alexander the Great. The musicologist Reinhard Strohm commented that Philip's court of "eclectic and flamboyant culture typified the feudal aspirations of the age". This golden age was not from any specific innovations by Philip specifically, but his continued patronage after a long-line of monarchial support for the arts.

You have heard the blind [men]
play at the court of Burgundy
haven't you? Surely you have.
Has there ever been anything like it?
I have seen Binchois shamed
and fall silent before their rebec playing
and Du Fay vexed and scowling
because he has no melody as beautiful.

Le champion des dames by Martin le Franc, stanza 2037 (lines 16289–16296) translated by Nancy Freeman Regalado

Among the residents of the court was the painter Jan van Eyck, who, according to the art historian Erwin Panofsky, may have portrayed Binchois in the Léal Souvenir portrait, though there is no widespread agreement for this. Binchois was associated with the leading composer of his day, Guillaume Du Fay. They likely met, alongside the poet Martin le Franc, during a meeting at Chambéry of the Burgundian and Savoy courts in February 1434. It was probably here that Le Franc wrote his famous Le champion des dames poem, which depicts the two composers and blind Burgundian vielle players. The only certain meeting of the composers was in March 1449, when Du Fay resided with Binchois in Mons for a convocation of canons. (Note: Fallows has noted that Du Fay's employer Jehan Hubert was associated with Binchois' father in numerous documents, suggesting that "there is therefore a possibility that the two composers knew one another from an early age.".) Aside from Du Fay, important composer contemporaries of the region included Hugo de Lantins and Arnold de Lantins. (Note: See a more complete list of Binchois' contemporaries in Brown (1976, pp. 59–65). See List of Renaissance composers for a broader list of the entire period)

The Burgundian chapel choir was unique in allowing its members to become clergy without being ordained as a priest; in 1437 Binchois became a subdeacon. Probably due to Philip's favor, he held prebends for at least four churches until his death: St Donatian, Bruges (from 7 January 1430); Ste Waudru, Mons (from 17 May 1437); St Vincent, Soignies (from 1452); and St Pierre, Cassel (from 21 May 1459). He was also made honorary court secretary in 1437 by Philip, who paid for a now-lost work by him on 29 May 1438, Passions en nouvelle maniere. It is possible that Binchois had some experience in medicine, since he attended to a duchess's toothache in July 1437, receiving 30 sous. The choir's attendance records are fairly thorough, and indicate that Binchois did not travel much on his own.

=== Final Soignies years ===
Binchois eventually retired in Soignies by February 1453, receiving a substantial pension until his death, presumably for his long years of exemplary service to the Burgundian court. In 1452 he became provost of the collegiate church of St Vincent. Around this time Soignies grew its reputation for musical excellence; Guillaume Malbecque and Johannes Regis were active there, while the contemporary writers Jacobus Lessabaeus and Lodovico Guicciardini praised the town's musical standards. Binchois may have been involved in the well known 1454 Feast of the Pheasant in Lille, as the motet Lamentatio sanctae matris ecclesiae Constantinopolitanae was performed, which may be by Binchois, but is usually ascribed to Du Fay.

On 20 September 1460 Binchois died in Soignies; his will mentions otherwise unknown family members, including his brothers Andri de Binch and Ernoul de Binch. He was buried in St. Vincent's collegiate church. Upon his death Ockeghem wrote a deploration, Mort, tu as navré de ton dart; its opening appears to quote an otherwise unknown chanson by Binchois. Fallows has suggested that Du Fay composed the rondeau En triumphant in 1460 for his colleague's death, since it seemingly references two songs by Binchois. (Note: Composers writing laments for fellow composers was a long-standing tradition in medieval and Renaissance music. Other examples include F. Andrieu's Armes, amours/O flour des flours (1377) for Guillaume de Machaut, Josquin des Prez's Nymphes des bois (1497) for Ockeghem, and William Byrd's Ye Sacred Muses (1585) for Thomas Tallis. See Rice (1999, p. 31) for a complete list of extant medieval and Renaissance laments.)

== Music ==
External videos
- Triste plaisir et douleureuse joye performed by the Sollazzo Ensemble
- Triste plaisir et douleureuse joye

The Encyclopædia Britannica characterizes Binchois' musical style as emphasizing "gently subtle rhythm, the suavely graceful melody, and the smooth treatment of dissonance [found in the music] of his English contemporaries". As a melodist, he is often considered among the finest of the 15th century; Fallows argues that in this regard, he had no contemporary equal. Binchois' composed exclusively vocal music; his compositions include 28 mass movements, 32 psalms, 28 smaller sacred works, 54 chansons, and a variety of motets. Most are written for three voices, although some have four.

Most commentators agree that Binchois was not a progressive composer. The musicologist Reinhard Strohm concludes that although he "earned his enormous reputation in the one genre in which he excelled as a composer [...] this master of melody and courtly performer apparently does not explore the depths of the art". Binchois utilized a limited range of techniques, favoring older melodic styles that echoed the 12th-century amour courtois (lit. 'courtly love') tradition of the troubadours and trouvères. His genre preference was equally conservative, favoring small-scale works over more fashionable cyclic masses and cantus firmus masses based on secular tunes. This preference led to musicologist Anthony Pryer to describe him as a "supreme miniaturist". Indeed only a single large-scale work of his survives, the incomplete isorhythmic motet Nove cantum melodie (1481). (Note: Binchois' disdain for large-scale genres may be a reflection of the Burgundian court culture, which Fallows presumes was "less festive and ambitious than its emulators in the south and less longwinded in its devotions than the more pretentious English establishments".)

Binchois' treatment of cadences was more forward-looking; he occasionally approached the dominant scale-degree and leading-tone with a tonal sensibilities of the later common practice period. His progressive use of dissonance has also incited much discussion—he often embraced moments of dissonant part writing, even when it was "easily avoided". On occasion, Binchois also treated the contratenor like a bass instrument, with a uniquely low and wide range.

Like Du Fay, Binchois was deeply influenced by the contenance angloise style of John Dunstaple and Lionel Power, which uniquely emphasized the third and sixth intervals and often highlighted duets within larger textures. Although Binchois probably never visited England, the Burgundian court had good relations with the English, with whom they established both diplomatic and cultural links; the Renaissance scholar Gordon Campbell notes that Binchois was "ideally placed to absorb and reflect styles from across the channel". (Note: This proximity probably permitted Binchois an earlier English-contact than Du Fay, whose main career was spent in the further south Italy. Some compositions by Binchois set the English Use of Sarum liturgy and some of his songs can be found in English manuscripts. The English composer John Bedyngham based a mass setting on Binchois' ballade "Dueil angoisseus".) The English influence was such that three settings of antiphons by Power and Dunstaple, along with a motet by Standley, were long-misattributed to Binchois. Strohm cautions that this influence was not prevalent enough to consider any of Binchois' works to be English in style or imitating an English model: "he followed his own, aural version of contenance angloise".

=== Secular ===
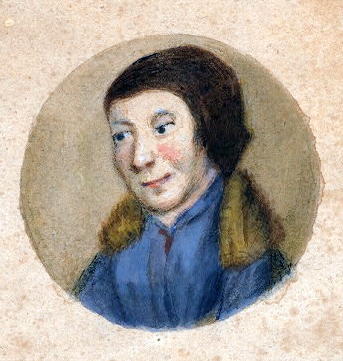
Watercolor of Binchois from Le Champion des dames

Binchois is best known for his lyric-driven secular French songs, known as chansons, which were widely transmitted and imitated by fellow composers. During Binchois' lifetime, the rondeau became the dominant chanson-type of the three formes fixes. This was reflected in Binchois' body of work: of his 54 chansons, the vast majority (47) are rondeaux and seven are ballades. His songs are almost exclusively in triple time, save for the rondeau "Seule esgaree" in duple meter. Other stylistic tropes include the use of under-third cadences (Landini cadences), the favoring of short phrases and material repetition. Pryer explains that "these superficial repetitions serve to demonstrate Binchois' flexibility, since it is rare for two phrases to have exactly the same rhythmic or melodic contour, and consecutive phrases rarely end on the same pitch or note-value." His melodies value simplicity, economy of material and, outside of the codas, minimal rhythmic activity. The musicologist Hans-Otto Korth has noted a resemblance between the melodic character and simplicity of Binchois' music and that of folk music, emphasizing it is a similarity in effect, not necessarily an influence. Fallows highlights these sentiments in numerous works: the "unforgettable grace" of "De plus en plus"; "restrained elegance" of "Mon cuer chante"; and "carefully balanced phrases" of "Adieu jusques je vous revoye".

The lyrics Binchois set were often by prominent French poet contemporaries, such as Charles, Duke of Orléans, Alain Chartier and Christine de Pizan. (Note: Fallows has doubted the apparent neatness of his exclusive setting the texts of major French poets, pointing out many of the authors have only been tentatively identified or unidentified. A text by his patron, William de la Pole was set by Binchois.) He chiefly prioritized serious courtly subjects, unlike his contemporaries who wrote spoof songs and celebratory songs for May Day and New Year's Day; the combinative chanson "Filles a marier/Se tu t’en marias", which cautions against marriage, is an exception. Binchois' method of text setting was often unique from his peers; his melodies are generally independent of the poem's rhyme scheme. Scholars note that his tendency to favor musical structure over poetic form has made their combination unpredictable in his works. This is a stark departure from the careful music-text balance of Guillaume Du Fay's compositions. Fallows suggests that this approach is an attempt to counter the strict structural rules of the formes fixes, while Slavin describes this attitude as more medieval than Humanistic-Renaissance.

In addition to not prioritizing poetic structure, Binchois heavily emphasized musical symmetry. The musicologist Wolfgang Rehm was the first to note that numerous Binchois songs, particularly early works, are symmetrically constructed in their length and the location of their middle cadence. Rehm also observed that in five-line rondeaux, Binchois added a sixth non-texted musical line, so that the music remained symmetrical. In works such as the rondeau "Amours et souvenir", abba poems are offset by an abab musical passage. As such, Binchois stands out from other Renaissance composers in that "poetic form of a song cannot always be deduced correctly from the music alone".

=== Sacred ===
Most of Binchois' sacred output is individual mass movements, alongside psalm and canticle settings (particularly magnificats) and a variety of smaller sacred works. No complete cyclic mass is extant and although scholars such as Laurence Feininger and Arthur Parris have attempted to combine movements into a complete work, Fallows considers these nowhere near the coherency of other Renaissance masses. Although a few pairs of movements are known, their unification comes from overarching stylistic similarities, not specific musical material. These mass movements are based around chant; unlike his contemporaries, the chant is used in a forward-looking manner: a starting point, not a strict foundation, allowing for more creative liberty. Conversely the overall mass movement structure is relatively conservative.

It is generally assumed that considerably more of Binchois' total sacred music (about 60 works) survives than secular, creating a "paradoxical image" of a composer best known for the latter. Regardless, the ease at which his secular output can be analyzed—both stylistically and chronologically—does not transfer here. The various church forms are treated distinctly, often without stylistic parallels. There are also departures from Binchois' secular characteristics: very few Burgundian cadences (octave-leap cadences), less major prolation, more selective tempus perfectum diminutum and less regular symmetry.

Counterpoint was not a priority to Binchois, who instead emphasized text declamation and musical contour. Thus his sacred output is often considered comparatively uninspired and routine; "severely practical" in the opinion of Pryer. Oftentimes the work's chant source is harmonized in a basic, "note-against-note" manner, with such harmony in the top voice, akin to the continental standard then. Homophony is his sacred texture of choice, typically in the fauxbourdon style, with melodies based on the Parisian rite—a then-fashionable approach in Burgundy. Fallows notes that even the simplistic counterpoint in his magnificats is more extreme in unremarkability than routine magnificats by Du Fay and Dunstaple. From these characteristics, Fallows considers Binchois' sacred works most similar to those of Johannes Brassart and Johannes de Limburgia.

== Legacy ==
"He had taught Dea and Gwynplaine to sing, according to the method of Orpheus and of Egide Binchois. Frequently he interrupted the lessons with cries of enthusiasm, such as 'Orpheus, musician of Greece! Binchois, musician of Picardy!'"

— The Man Who Laughs, chp. 6, by Victor Hugo

Many musicologists hold Binchois, Du Fay, and Dunstaple as the three major European composers of the early 15th-century. Fallows grants, "the extent to which [Binchois'] works were borrowed, cited, parodied and intabulated in the later 15th century implies that he had more direct influence than either [Du Fay or Dunstaple]". But Reinhard Strohm questions whether Binchois compares with Du Fay, stating that while Binchois "earned his enormous reputation in the one genre in which he excelled as a composer, performer and possibly even poet, Du Fay's creativity unfolded along many more musical lines". Indeed, Du Fay's career was both lengthier and more prolific than that of Binchois. (Dunstaple, meanwhile, is described by musicologist Margaret Bent as "probably the most influential English composer of all time.")

Works by Binchois circulated for decades after his death, and were often used as sources for Mass composition by later composers. About half of his extant secular music is found in the manuscript Oxford, Bodleian Library MS Canon. misc. 213.

== Editions ==
The standard editions for Binchois' sacred and secular music are Rehm 1957 and Kaye 1991 respectively
Historical editions

- Riemann, Hugo, ed. (1892). Sechs bisher nicht gedruckte dreistimmige Chansons … von Gilles Binchois (ca. 1425) aus dem Codex Mus. Ms. 3192 der Münchener Hof- und Staatsbibl. in moderne Notierung übertragen, mit neuem (deutschem) Text [Six previously unpublished three-voice chansons … by Gilles Binchois (c. 1425) from Codex Mus. Ms. 3192 of the Munich Court and State Library, transcribed into modern notation with a new (German) text] (in German). Wiesbaden. OCLC 17704139.
- Stainer, John Frederick Randall; Stainer, Cecie, eds. (1898). Dufay and his Contemporaries: Fifty Compositions (Ranging from about A.D. 1400 to 1440). Introduction by Edward Nicholson; musical analysis by John Stainer (1 ed.). London: Novello & Co. OCLC 1120811734. Archive.org
  - Stainer, John Frederick Randall; Stainer, Cecie, eds. (1963). Dufay and his Contemporaries: Fifty Compositions (Ranging from about A.D. 1400 to 1440). Introduction by Edward Nicholson; musical analysis by John Stainer (2 ed.). Amsterdam: Frits A.M. Knuf. OCLC 21452928.
- von Ficker, Rudolf, ed. (1924). Sieben Trienter Codices. Denkmäler der Tonkunst in Österreich. Vol. XXXI. Vienna: Universal Edition. OCLC 20376641.
- Droz, Eugénie; Thibault, Geneviève, eds. (1924). Poètes et musiciens du XVe siècle [Poets and Musicians of the 15th Century] (in French). Paris. OCLC 3865780.
- Van den Borren, Charles [in French], ed. (1932). Polyphonia Sacra. Nashdom: Plainsong and Medieval Music Society. OCLC 663506936. 2nd edition, 1962
- Marix, Jeanne, ed. (1937). Les musiciens de la cour de Bourgogne au XVe siècle [Musicians of the Burgundy court in the 15th century]. New York: AMS Press. OCLC 1312495580.

Modern editions

- Rehm, Wolfgang, ed. (1957). Die Chansons von Gilles Binchois (1400–1460). Musikalische Denkmäler 2. Mainz: Schott Music. OCLC 20617065.
- Kaye, Philip R., ed. (1991). The Sacred Music of Gilles Binchois. Oxford: Oxford University Press. OCLC 23975354.
