= Burgundian School =

15th-century European composers

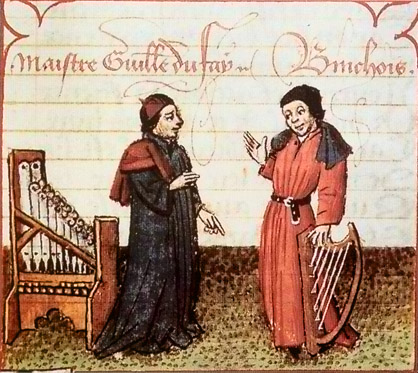
Composer Guillaume Dufay (left) and Gilles Binchois (right), Martin le Franc, "Champion des Dames"

The Burgundian School was a group of composers active in the 15th century in what is now northern and eastern France, Belgium, and the Netherlands, centered on the court of the Dukes of Burgundy. The school inaugurated the music of Burgundy.

The main names associated with this school are Guillaume Dufay, Gilles Binchois, Antoine Busnois and (as an influence), the English composer John Dunstaple. The Burgundian School was the first phase of activity of the Franco-Flemish School, the central musical practice of the Renaissance in Europe.

== Background ==
In late Medieval and early Renaissance Europe, cultural centers tended to move from one place to another due to changing political stability and the presence of either the spiritual or temporal power, for instance the Pope, Anti-pope or the Holy Roman Emperor. In the 14th century, the main centers of musical activity were northern France, Avignon, and Italy, as represented by Guillaume de Machaut and the ars nova, the ars subtilior, and Landini respectively; Avignon had a brief but important cultural flowering because it was the location of the Papacy during the Western Schism. When France was ravaged by the Hundred Years' War (1337–1453), the cultural center migrated farther east, to towns in Burgundy and the Low Countries, known then collectively as the Netherlands.

During the reign of the House of Valois, Burgundy was the most powerful and stable political division in western Europe, and added, a bit at a time, Flanders, Brabant, Holland, Luxembourg, Alsace and Lorraine. Especially during the reigns of Philip the Good (1419–1467) and Charles the Bold (1467–1477), this entire area, loosely known as Burgundy, was a center of musical creativity. Most of the musical activity did not take place in what is modern-day Burgundy, which has its capital in Dijon (even though the Dukes of Burgundy maintained an administrative center there). The main centers of music-making were Brussels, Bruges, Lille, and Arras, as well as smaller towns in that same general area.

Musicians from the region came to Burgundy to study and further their own careers as the reputation of the area spread. The Burgundian rulers were not merely patrons of the arts, but took an active part: Charles the Bold himself played the harp, and composed chansons and motets (although none have survived with reliable attribution). The worldly dukes also encouraged the composition of secular music to a degree seen only rarely before in European music history, a characteristic which itself defines the Burgundian epoch as a Renaissance phenomenon.

This migration of musical culture east from Paris to Burgundy also corresponds with the conventional (and by no means universally accepted) division of music history into Medieval and Renaissance; while Guillaume de Machaut is often considered to be one of the last Medieval composers, Dufay is often considered to be the first significant Renaissance composer.

Charles the Bold was killed in 1477 in the Battle of Nancy, during one of his attempts to add territory to his empire. After his death, music continued to flourish as before, but the region was split politically, with the duchy of Burgundy being absorbed into France, and most of the Low Countries becoming part of the holdings of the Spanish Habsburgs. Both the French court and the Habsburgs were patrons of music; however, a French style began to diverge from that of the Low Countries, especially in secular music, and in the period after 1500.

== Composers ==
The history of Burgundian music began with the organization of the chapel in 1384; twenty years later, it rivaled the famous establishment at Avignon in splendor. Names associated with this early phase of Burgundian music include Johannes Tapissier and Nicolas Grenon, who carried the tradition across to the next phase of the chapel, when it was reorganized in 1415. Other early composers there were Hugo and Arnold de Lantins, both of whom Dufay later met in Italy.

Of all the names associated with the Burgundian School, the most famous was Guillaume Dufay, who was probably the most famous composer in Europe in the 15th century. He wrote music in many of the forms which were current, music which was melodic, singable and memorable (more than half of his sacred music consists of simple harmonizations of plainsong, for example). Contemporary with Dufay were composers such as Gilles Binchois, who was at the Burgundian court between approximately 1430 and 1460, and Hayne van Ghizeghem, a composer, singer and soldier who may have been killed in the last military campaign of Charles the Bold.

After the death of Dufay in 1474, the most prominent Burgundian musician was Antoine Busnois, who was also a prolific composer of chansons, and who possibly wrote the famous L'homme armé tune.

== Musical style and forms ==
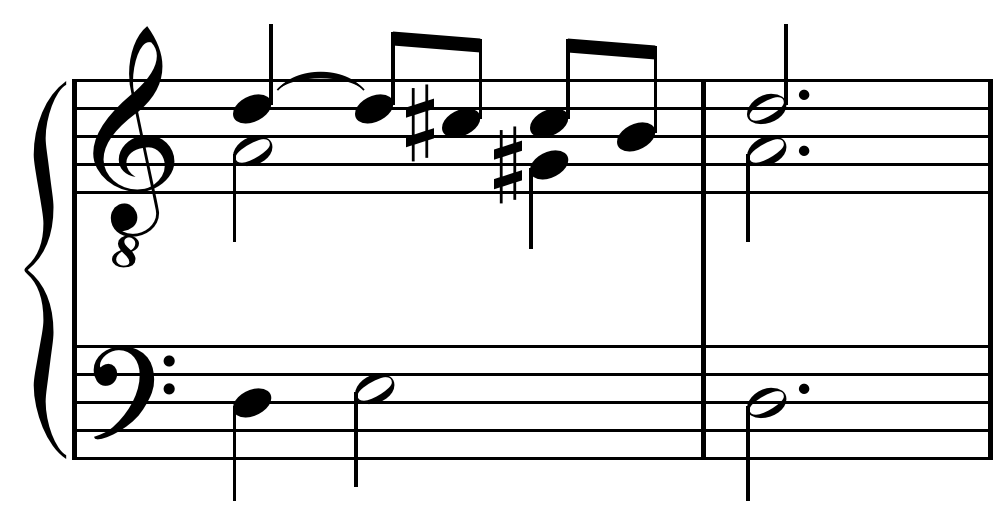
Burgundian cadence on D; note the parallel fourths between upper voices.

Burgundian composers favored secular forms, at least while they worked in Burgundian lands; much sacred music survives, especially from those composers who spent time in Italy, for example in the papal choir. The most prominent secular forms used by the Burgundians were the four formes fixes (rondeau, ballade, virelai, and bergerette), all generically known as chansons. Of the four, the rondeau was by far the most popular; at any rate more rondeaux have survived than any other form. Most of the rondeaux were in three voices, and in French, though there are a few in other languages. In most of the rondeaux, the uppermost voice (the "superius") was texted, and the other voices were most likely played by instruments. The bergerette was developed by the Burgundians themselves; it was like a virelai, but shorter, having only one stanza.

Most of the composers also wrote sacred music in Latin; this was to remain true for the next several generations. They wrote both masses and motets, as well as cycles of Magnificats. During the period, the mass transformed from a group of individual sections written by different composers, often using a head-motif technique, to unified cycles based on a cantus firmus. Dufay, Binchois, Busnois, Reginald Liebert and others all wrote cyclic masses. One of the favorite tunes used as a cantus firmus was the renowned l'homme armé, which was set not only by the Burgundians but by composers of subsequent centuries; indeed it was the most common tune used as a basis for mass composition in all of music history, with more than forty surviving masses featuring the melody. David Fallows writes of it in the New Grove: "It is hard to think of any other melody in the history of music that has yielded so much music of the highest quality."

During the period the motet transformed from the isorhythmic model of the 14th century to the smoothly polyphonic, sectional composition seen in the work of the later Burgundians such as Busnois. In the motets, as well as the masses and other sacred music, a common musical technique employed was fauxbourdon, a harmonization of an existing chant in parallel 6-3 chords, occasionally ornamented to prevent monotony. Composition using fauxbourdon allowed sung text to be clearly understood, but avoided the plainness of simple chant. Burgundian motets tended to be in Latin, written for three voices with the top voice being the most important. An example of a Burgundian motet is Quam pulchra es, written by Dunstaple in the early 15th century.

Instrumental music was also cultivated at the Burgundian courts, often for dancing. A peculiarity of the Burgundian instrumental style is that the dukes preferred music for loud instruments (trumpets, tambourins, shawms, bagpipes) and more of this survives than for other current instruments such as the lute or the harp. In contemporary practice, the loud instruments would usually play from an elevated location, such as a balcony, while the other instruments would play closer to the dancers.

Instrumental forms included the basse danse, or bassadanza, which was a ceremonial dance of a rather dignified character, and relatively slow tempo. Typically it was in a duple meter subdivided into threes (in modern notation, 6/8), and often the dance would be immediately followed by a quick dance, the tordion or pas de Brabant.

The Burgundian School was the first generation of what is sometimes known as the Netherlands School, several generations of composers spanning 150 years who composed in the polyphonic style associated with the mainstream of Renaissance practice. Later generations, which were no longer specifically associated with either the court or the region of Burgundy but were interlinked by adjacent geography and by common musical practice, included such names as Johannes Ockeghem, Jacob Obrecht, Josquin des Prez, Adrian Willaert and Orlandus Lassus.

== Manuscript sources ==
There are approximately 65 manuscript sources which contain music by Burgundian composers. The most prominent of these include:

- Canonici Manuscript (containing music from around 1400 to 1440). This manuscript is at the Bodleian Library in Oxford, England; it is named after a previous owner, Matteo Luigi Canonici, an 18th-century Venetian Jesuit. It has 380 compositions in all, including works by 60 composers. Both sacred and secular music are well represented in this collection.
- Laborde Chansonnier (containing music mainly composed during the reign of Charles the Bold, 1467–1477). It is named after the Marquis de Laborde, and is presently at the Library of Congress in Washington, DC. It has 106 pieces of music in all.
- Mellon Chansonnier (containing music from approximately 1440 to 1477). It is named after Paul Mellon, who gave it to Yale University; currently it is in the Beinecke Library there. It has 57 compositions, and includes some non-Burgundian music as well (for example, works by contemporary English and Italian composers)
- Dijon Chansonnier (containing music from approximately 1470 to 1475). Some of the music is by composers not normally associated with the Burgundian school, such as Ockeghem, Loyset Compère, and Johannes Tinctoris. It is at the public library in Dijon, and contains 161 pieces of music in all.
- El Escorial Chansonnier (containing music from about 1430 to 1445). It is in the Biblioteca del Monasterio, El Escorial, V.III.24, and is commonly referred to as EscA. It contains a total of 62 compositions, only one of which is attributed (to Gilles Binchois), although many of the rest have been assigned to Binchois, Dunstaple, Dufay, and others, on stylistic grounds.

== Burgundian composers ==
- Johannes Tapissier (c.1370 – c.1410)
- Guillaume Dufay (?1397–1474)
- Jean Cousin (b. before 1425, d. after 1475)
- Hugo de Lantins (fl. c.1430)
- Arnold de Lantins (fl. c.1430)
- Johannes Legrant fl. c. 1420–1440
- Guillaume Legrant fl. 1405–1449
- Reginaldus Libert (fl. c.1425–1435)
- Gilles Binchois (c.1400–1460)
- Johannes Brassart (c.1400–1455)
- Hayne van Ghizeghem (c.1445 – c.1480)
- Pierre Fontaine (c.1380 – c.1450)
- Nicolas Grenon (c. 1375 – 1456)
- Gilles Joye (1424/1425–1483)
- Robert Morton (c.1430 – c.1479)
- Antoine Busnois (c.1430 – 1492)
- Guillaume le Rouge (fl. 1450–1465)
- Adrien Basin (fl. 1457–1476)
- Jacobus Vide (fl. 1405–1433)
