= Nicolas Grenon =

French composer

Nicolas Grenon (c. 1375 – October 17, 1456) was a French composer of the early Renaissance. He wrote in all the prevailing musical forms of the time, and was a rare case of a long-lived composer who learned his craft in the late 14th century but primarily practiced during the era during which the Renaissance styles were forming.

== Life ==
The earliest records of Grenon are from Paris, where he worked first in the Notre Dame Cathedral, and on the death of his brother moved to a job at the St Sépulchre as a canon. He rose in the ecclesiastical hierarchy at St Sépulchre, and then left Paris, moving first to Laon in 1403, and then Cambrai in 1408. In 1409 he took a post for the Duke of Berry as the "master of the boys", the music teacher and caretaker of the choirboys, at Bourges; and in 1412 he began his career with the Burgundian court of John the Fearless (Duke of Burgundy). In 1419 he returned to Cambrai, and from 1425 to 1427 worked in Rome as the master of the choirboys in the papal chapel under Pope Martin V.

He retired to Cambrai, where in the 1440s he worked with Guillaume Dufay on a complete revision of the polyphonic liturgical music of the cathedral. He died in Cambrai in 1456 after an unusually long life.

== Music and influence ==
Grenon's music shows aspects of both medieval and early Renaissance practice. His secular music is the most up-to-date, and includes examples of each of the prevailing formes fixes, the ballade, the virelai, and the rondeau. The melody is always in the topmost voice, and all are for three voices.

The motets by Grenon are unusual in their use of strict isorhythmic technique, usually in all voices. In some aspects they are similar to motets of Dufay, except for the strictness of the isorhythmic principle. One is datable to 1414, since it praises the antipope John XXIII, and probably corresponds to the opening of the Council of Konstanz. Grenon also wrote masses, but none survive complete; only a fragment of a Gloria remains, not enough to establish his stylistic technique for this type of composition.

=== Works ===
Grenon's complete surviving works are edited in Gilbert Reaney, Early Fifteenth-Century Music, vol. 7 ([Rome]: American Institute of Musicology, 1983. The only piece transmitted in more than two sources at the time of that publication was Se je vous ay bien. Several copies of Je ne requier de ma dame, however, have been discovered since Reaney's publication. The pieces are, in Reaney's order:

1. Se je vous ay bien loyaulment amée (rondeau)
2. La plus jolie et la plus belle (rondeau or through-composed chanson)
3. Je suy defait se vous ne me refaites (rondeau or unknown form)
4. Je ne requier de ma dame (ballade)
5. La plus belle et doulce figure (virelai)
6. Et in terra (Gloria; missing tenor?)
7. Ave virtus virtutum, caritas / Prophetarum fulti suffragio / Infelix, propera (motet)
8. Ad honorem sancte trinitatis / Celorum regnum sempiternum / Isti semper celestibus (motet)
9. Plasmatoris humani generis / Verbigine mater ecclesia (motet)
10. Nova obis gaudia (motet)

Craig Wright (Grove, 2001) argues for the ascription of Argi vices/Cum Pilemon (attributed in the Aosta codex to "Nicolao") to Grenon as well.

== References and further reading ==
- Wright, Craig (1980). "Nicolas Grenon". In Sadie, Stanley (ed.). The New Grove Dictionary of Music and Musicians. Vol. vii (1st ed.). London: Macmillan. p. 702.
- idem. "Nicolas Grenon", Grove Music Online, ed. L. Macy (accessed January 22, 2005), grovemusic.com (subscription access).
- Gustave Reese, Music in the Renaissance. New York, W.W. Norton & Co., 1954. ISBN 0-393-09530-4
- Richard H. Hoppin, Medieval Music. New York, W.W. Norton & Co., 1978. ISBN 0-393-09090-6
