= Music of Burgundy =

Burgundy became a major centre for musical development during the Renaissance era. Among the dances Burgundy has produced are the elegant, energetic basse danse and the bransle which was associated with the lower classes in the Middle Ages while the upper class likely danced pavanes and galliards. Modern Burgundy is home to music festivals like the Ainey International Music Festival.

The Burgundian School was a group of composers active in the 15th century in what is now eastern France, Belgium, and the Netherlands, centred on the court of the Dukes of Burgundy. The main names associated with this school are Guillaume Dufay, Gilles Binchois, and Antoine Busnois. For a time in the early 15th century, the court of Burgundy was the musical centre of gravity of Europe, eclipsing even Rome, the seat of the Papacy, and Avignon, the home of the Antipopes. By late in the 15th century the Burgundian style was subsumed into the larger stream of Franco-Flemish music.
