= Adrien Basin =

Franco-Flemish composer (1457/76–after 1498)

Adrien Basin (fl. 1457 – 1476; died after 1498) was a Franco-Flemish composer, singer, and diplomat of the Burgundian School of the early Renaissance. He was listed along with Antoine Busnois and Hayne van Ghizeghem as one of the personal singers to Charles the Bold, Duke of Burgundy.

== Life and career ==
Little is known about his early life, and he first appears in the records as a singer to Isabella of Bourbon, who was the wife of Charles the Bold. Later he seems to have joined the personal chapel of Charles, when Charles became Duke. Unlike many of the musicians of the Burgundian court, who travelled along with Charles on his military exploits (who loved music as much as war, and enjoyed having musical entertainment during his military adventures), Basin seems to have remained in Bruges most of the time. After the death of Charles at the Battle of Nancy in 1477, Basin served the court as a diplomat, according to records from the 1480s. The last record of his life is dated to 1498, when he was named as heir to his brother Pierre.

All of Basin's surviving music is secular, although some of the anonymous music in the manuscripts of the time may be by him. Of his secular songs, one became immensely popular. Nos amys vous vous abusés was used by several later composers, including Tinctoris, as a source for mass settings, and numerous copies of the song have been found, some in collections as far away as Poland and Portugal. Before the advent of music printing at the beginning of the 16th century, such distribution is rare, and generally shows the popularity of a piece. This song, included in the Mellon Chansonnier, is the only one securely attributed to Adrien Basin: his others, ascribed simply to 'Basin' in their sources, may have been written by his brother.

Dates of composition of Basin's songs are not known, but probably they were written during the period when he was a singer for Charles. If he wrote later music, either it has not survived, or has survived anonymously.

== Works ==
Three songs are attributed to Basin:

- Nos amys vous vous abusés (rondeau, 3vv)
- Ma dame faytes moy savoir (ascribed to 'Basin' in the source [Rome, Biblioteca Casanatense, sezione Musica, 2856]: is may be by Basin's brother, Pierre)
- Vien'avante morte (ascribed simply to 'Basin'; also may be by Pierre Basin)
