= Johannes Legrant =

French or Burgundian composer

Johannes Legrant (fl. c. 1420 – 1440) was a French or Burgundian composer of the early Renaissance.

Little is known for certain about his life, and as is common for composers of the early 15th century, there are problems of identification in the existing records. In 1423 and 1424, he may have been a vicar at St. Vincent in Soignies, a collegiate church with an active music establishment. Antwerp Cathedral's records mention a 'Heer Jan le Grant' as a singer there from 1441 to 1443, and this may also have been him.

All of Legrant's surviving music is vocal. His style is related to that of the early Burgundian School, and resembles some of the early work of Guillaume Dufay and Gilles Binchois; influence may have gone either way. He wrote elegant melodic lines in the Burgundian manner, and used the secular forms which were typical of the Burgundians: the rondeau and the ballade. Imitation is also prominent in his work.

In addition to his secular music – four rondeaux and a ballade – four sacred pieces have survived, including two settings of the Gloria of the mass, for two and three voices, and a three voice Credo.

It is not known if he is related to Guillaume Legrant, a slightly better-known contemporary of Johannes. The one ballade attributed to Johannes has also been suggested to be the work of Guillaume based on stylistic characteristics.
