= Legrant =

Legrant or LeGrant is a surname and occasional masculine given name of French origin, a variant of Legrand, which originated as a nickname for a tall man. Notable people with the name include:

== Surname ==
- Guillaume Legrant (fl. 1405–1449), French composer
- Johannes Legrant (fl. c. 1420–1440), French composer

== Given name ==
- LeGrant Scott (1910–1993), American baseball player
