= Gilles Joye =

Franco-Flemish composer

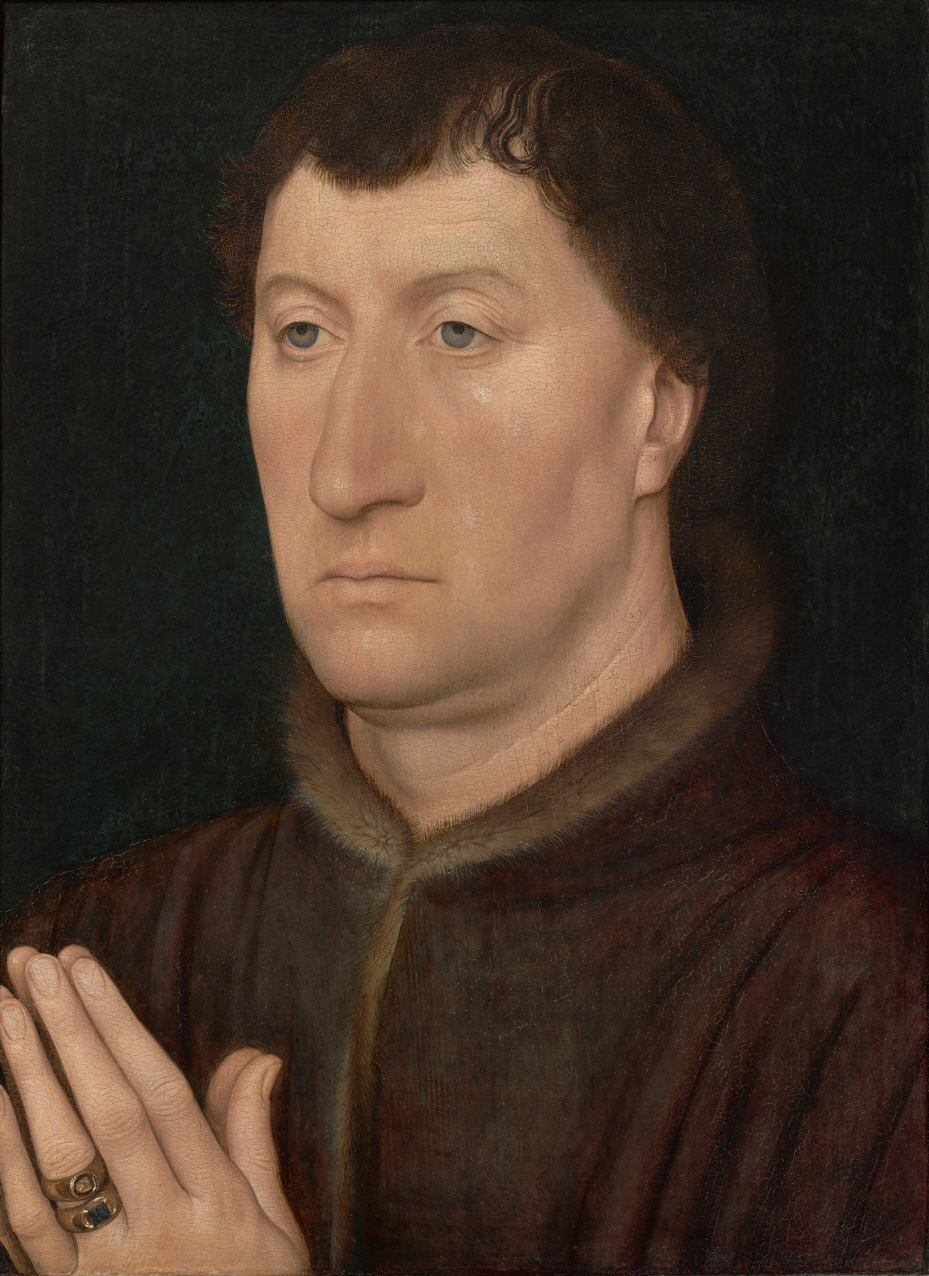
Portrait of Gilles Joye by Hans Memling, c. 1472

Gilles Joye (1424 or 1425 – 31 December 1483) was a Franco-Flemish composer of the Renaissance. A member of the Burgundian school, he was known mainly for his secular songs which were in a lyrical and graceful style.

== Life ==
He may have come from Kortrijk, since an Oliver Joye, possibly his father, has been identified there in 1420. Gilles seems to have had an excellent musical education, probably at either Kortrijk or Bruges, where he was hired as a singer in 1449. Documents from the cathedral archives show that he was often in trouble: engaging in street brawls, frequenting brothels, refusing to take part in regular singing events, and in particular visiting a notorious prostitute of the town named "Rosabelle". In spite of these activities, he was made a priest, and became a canon at Cleves in 1453 and at St. Donatian in 1459.

Between 1454 and 1459 no record of his activities survives in the Low Countries; based on his composition of an Italian ballata on a poem by a contemporary Florentine, it has been suggested that he spent some time in Italy, as did so many other Franco-Flemish composers of his and succeeding generations. By 1459 he was back at St. Donatian in Bruges.

In 1462 he was hired as a singer by the Burgundian court chapel, a position he retained officially until 1471, although he had ceased to perform his duties in 1468. Between 1465 and 1473 he was also a rector at Delft. After 1471 he most likely returned to St. Donatian. He died in Bruges, and was buried in the church of St. Donatian.

A portrait of Joye has survived, possibly painted by Hans Memling in 1472. Currently it is in the Sterling and Francine Clark Art Institute in Williamstown, Massachusetts.

== Music ==
All of Joye's surviving music is vocal and secular, and for three voices only. Four of his works are rondeaux, in French (though the text for one rondeau is lost), and one is an Italian ballata, probably written between 1454 and 1459 when he may have been in Italy. Joye's songs are typical of the Burgundian secular music of the period; they are melodic, clear, and lyrical in style. One of them, Ce qu'on fait, is frankly obscene. No sacred music is known for certain to have been written by Joye, but two anonymous masses based on the contemporary lyric O rosa bella have been attributed to Joye for stylistic reasons; in addition, the similarity of O rosa bella to the name of his favorite prostitute, along with the general irreverent character evident in his life and other work, may support this hypothesis.

Joye is one of the composers mentioned in Guillaume Crétin's famous poem Déploration sur le trépas de Jean Ockeghem written on the death of Johannes Ockeghem in 1497; in it he is one of the angels welcoming Ockeghem into Heaven. The composers mentioned by Crétin have long been used as a list of those considered most famous in the late 15th century, thus indicating Joye's reputation, in spite of the small number of his works which have survived.

== Works ==
1. Ce qu'on fait a catimini (3 voices, rondeau, in French)
2. Mercy mon dueil je ne supplied (3 voices, rondeau, in French)
3. Non pas que je veuille penser (3 voices, rondeau, in French)
4. Textless rondeau, also for three voices
5. Poy ché crudel Fortuna et rio Distino (3 voices, ballata, in Italian)
