= Jean Cousin =

Jean Cousin may refer to:

- Jean Cousin the Elder (c. 1495 – after 1560), French painter
- Jean Cousin the Younger (1522–1594), French painter, son of the above
- Jean Cousin (composer) (before 1425 – after 1475), French or Flemish composer and singer
- Jean Cousin (navigator), 15th century French naval lieutenant
