= Pierre Fontaine (composer) =

French composer

Pierre Fontaine (pronounced [pjɛʁ fɔ̃tɛn]; c. 1380 – c. 1450) was a French composer of the transitional era between the late Middle Ages and early Renaissance, and a member of the Burgundian School of composers. While he was well known at the time, most of his music has probably been lost. All of his surviving music is secular, and all his compositions are chansons.

== Life ==
He was born in Rouen and is presumed to have had his early musical training there. By 1403 he was a singer at the large and splendid chapel of Philip the Bold, and after it was disbanded in 1404 he became a clerk at Ste. Chapelle in Bourges, where he served at least until 1407.

He was a singer at the court chapel of Burgundy when it was reconstituted, after a period of inactivity, by John the Fearless, the new Duke of Burgundy in 1415. When John died in 1419 Fontaine left the chapel and went to northern Italy, joining the singers in the chapel of Pope Martin V, where he probably remained through the early 1420s. Around the end of the decade he came back to Burgundy, where he sang in the chapel yet again, this time under Philip the Good, and where he remained at least until 1447. No record of his death survives, but a replacement for him was hired in 1451.

== Music and influence ==
Eight compositions by Fontaine survive, including six rondeaux and a ballade, two of the three types of chansons known as the formes fixes. All of Fontaine's pieces are for three voices.

These pieces contain some unusual features. J'ayme bien celui, a rondeau, includes the unusual direction "contra tenor trompette" for the lowest voice, indicating that it was to be performed on a slide trumpet, an instrument related to the trombone (by the late 15th century, this instrument had been named the sackbut). Not only is this a rare case of a specific instrument being required in an early 15th-century composition, but the piece contains notes outside of the gamut, the range of pitches to which most music of the time was restricted: the part for "contra tenor trompette" goes down to D below the bass staff. It has been suggested that Fontaine may not have written this part, since it appears only in one of the sources in which the rondeau survives, the Escorial V.III.24 manuscript.

Most of Fontaine's pieces are concise: a transcription of Pastourelle en un vergier in modern musical notation only consists of 11 bars. The texture of his music is simple, with the melodic line on top, as is typical of secular Burgundian music of the period.

== Works ==
1. A son plaisir volentiers serviroye (rondeau)
2. De bien amer (rondeau)
3. J’ayme bien celui qui s'en va (contains the performance indication for slide trumpet in the lowest part) (rondeau)
4. Mon cuer pleure (rondeau)
5. Pastourelle en un vergier (ballade)
6. Pour vous tenir/Mon doulx amy
7. Sans faire de vous departie (a separate arrangement of this piece, using the tenor as a basse danse has survived in a manuscript from Brussels which belonged to Margarete of Austria, granddaughter of Charles the Bold)
8. Fontaine a vous dire le voir
