= Johannes Tapissier =

French composer and teacher

Johannes Tapissier (also Jean Tapissier, Jean de Noyers) (c. 1370 – 1408 to 1410) was a French composer and teacher of the late Middle Ages, in the period transitional to the Renaissance style. He was one of the first members of the Burgundian School, the group of composers associated with the Dukes of Burgundy, and from which the Franco-Flemish style developed.

== Life ==
The first record of his life is from 1391, when he was hired as a "valet de chambre" and composer for the court of Philip the Bold. He went with the duke on his travels, going to Avignon at least twice (1391, and again in 1395), where he doubtless encountered the composers and music of the Avignon repertory; Avignon then was the center of composition on the manneristic ars subtilior style. He was perhaps one of the contributors to the repertory, but if he left any secular music, or any music in the complex, mannered style, it has either been lost or remains anonymous.

The anonymous Règles de la seconde rhétorique, written around 1400, lists Tapissier as being among the most famous French poets, singers, and composers of the time. Around the time this account was written, and into the first decade of the 15th century, Tapissier ran a singing school in Paris; records from the Burgundian court indicate that they sent boys there to learn to sing. The peak of development of the Burgundian court chapel was in 1404, before the death of Philip, when it surpassed in splendor the chapels of the antipope at Avignon and the king of France, and many of Tapissier's students would have contributed to this development. Further court records show that his students "auditioned" for John the Fearless, the new Duke of Burgundy, in 1408, and they performed at services later that same year. Tapissier was dead by August 1410, but no further details on the circumstances have emerged.

Tapissier is among the musicians mentioned by Martin le Franc in his long poem, Le Champion des dames:

Tapissier, Carmen, Cesaris
N'a pas longtemps si bien chanterrent
Qu'ilz esbahirent tout Paris

(Tapissier, Carmen, and Cesaris
Not long ago they did sing so well,
That they astonished all of Paris)

Tapissier seems to have been mostly forgotten before the 20th-century; in 1866, the musicologist François-Joseph Fétis remarked that the names Tapissier, Carmen and Cesaris were unknown to music scholars.

== Music ==
Only three pieces by Tapissier have survived: two mass movements (a Credo and a Sanctus), and an isorhythmic motet which laments the Western Schism which divided the Roman Catholic Church. Baude Cordier, one of the composers of the ars subtilior, wrote a Gloria which forms a probable pair with Tapissier's Credo

All of his compositions are for three voices. Although they are all sacred, they are stylistically more akin to the chansons of the time than to most other mass movements.

== Sources ==
- Craig Wright: "Johannes Tapissier", Grove Music Online, ed. L. Macy (Accessed January 7, 2006), (subscription access)
- Craig Wright, "Burgundy", in The New Grove Dictionary of Music and Musicians, ed. Stanley Sadie. 20 vol. London, Macmillan Publishers Ltd., 1980. ISBN 1-56159-174-2
- Reese, Gustave (1959). Music in the Renaissance (revised ed.). New York, New York: W. W. Norton & Company. ISBN 978-0-393-09530-2.
