= John Dunstaple =

English composer (c. 1390–1453)

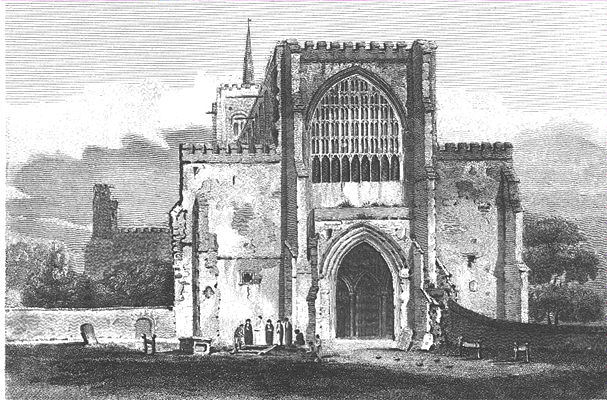
John Dunstaple had connections to St Albans Abbey, Hertfordshire.

John Dunstaple (or Dunstable; c. 1390 – 24 December 1453) was an English composer whose music helped inaugurate the transition from the medieval to the Renaissance periods. The central proponent of the Contenance angloise style (lit. 'English manner'), Dunstaple was the leading English composer of his time, and is often coupled with William Byrd and Henry Purcell as England's most important early music composers. His style would have an immense influence on the subsequent music of continental Europe, inspiring composers such as Du Fay, Binchois, Ockeghem and Busnois.

Information on Dunstaple's life is largely non-existent or speculative, with the only certain date of his activity being his death on Christmas Eve of 1453. Probably born in Dunstable in Bedfordshire during the late 14th-century, Dunstaple was associated with Humphrey, Duke of Gloucester and Joan of Navarre, and, through them, St Albans Abbey. Another important patron was John, Duke of Bedford, with whom Dunstaple may have travelled to France.

Dunstaple's surviving music is exclusively vocal, and frequently uses isorhythms, while pioneering the prominent use of harmonies with thirds and sixths.

== Life and career ==
Nothing is known for certain of John Dunstaple's background or early life. This uncertainty, and the general vagueness surrounding most details of his life, has led to much speculation and sometimes fictionalized information concerning his life and career. Some of the spurious information comes from misreadings of Johannes Tinctoris's writings, leading to the erroneous identification of the composer with the 10th-century saint Dunstan. (Note: See Bukofzer 1954 for further information.) Dunstaple's birthdate is a conjecture based on his earliest surviving works from around 1410–1420, which suggests he was born in the late 14th century; the musicologist Margaret Bent records c. 1390.

His birthplace is unknown, though it is assumed that his family adopted their surname after the town of Dunstable, Bedfordshire. Modern scholarship has sometimes used the spelling 'Dunstable' to match the town's name, though sources of the composer's time generally refer to him as 'Dunstaple' instead. The musicologist Margaret Bent notes that the 'p' spelling is more than twice as common as the 'b' variant in musical sources, and while the few extant English sources use the 'b' and 'p' variants with equal frequency, contemporary non-musical sources almost exclusively follow the 'p' spelling. Less common spellings include 'Dunstapell', 'Dumstable' and 'Donstaple', among others; one source simply inscribed 'J. D.'. Records from the early 15th century include many references to people named (or with a similar name to) 'John Dunstaple', making it difficult to identify the composer. The more plausible candidates include a canon of Hereford Cathedral (1419–1440) named 'John Dunstavylle', though there is no convincing evidence for this. However, the composer is usually identified as the 'John Dunstaple' that owned a series of astronomy treatises and was described as a 'musician with the Duke of Bedford'.

He is widely held to have been in the royal service of John of Lancaster, 1st Duke of Bedford, the fourth son of Henry IV and brother of Henry V. As such he may have stayed in France for some time, since the duke was Regent of France from 1423 to 1429, and then Governor of Normandy from 1429 to his death in 1435. He owned property in Normandy, and also in Cambridgeshire, Essex and London, according to tax records of 1436. After the death in 1437 of another patron, the Dowager Queen Joan, he evidently was in the service of Humphrey, Duke of Gloucester, the fifth son of Henry IV.

Unlike many composers of the time, he was probably not a cleric or monk, though there are links with St Albans Abbey (see below); he was probably married, based on the record of women sharing his name in his parish, and he also owned a manor in Hertfordshire.

Dunstaple's connections with St Albans Abbey are at least twofold:

- the abbot John Whethamstede is associated with the Duke of Gloucester (who was buried at St Albans following his death in 1447), and Dunstaple's isorhythmic motet Albanus roseo rutilat, possibly with some of the Latin words adapted by Whethamstede from an older poem, was clearly written for St Albans, possibly for a visit to the abbey by the Duke of Bedford in 1426.
- Whethamstede's plan for a magnificent library for the abbey in 1452–53 included a set of twelve stained glass windows devoted to the various branches of learning. Dunstaple is clearly, if indirectly, referred to in some of the verses the abbot composed for each window, not only music but also astronomy, medicine, and astrology.

Epitaphs written upon Dunstaple's death identify him as not only a musician, but as well as respected mathematician, astronomer and astrologer. Dunstaple is referenced in at least three non-musical manuscripts. Of these, Bent considers GB-Ce 70 (Emmanuel College, Cambridge) the most important and it includes astrological works with accompanying drawings which may be his own. Another, GB-Ob Laud misc. 674 (Bodleian Library, Oxford), demonstrates "high competence but no more originality than any of his contemporaries" according to Bent. Although no extant mathematic or scientific manuscripts written by him survive, he is known to have made copies of other's manuscripts. Dunstaple also owned two manuscripts by Boethius: a copy of De musica and De arithmetica. (Note: These two manuscripts are found in a single volume, labeled by modern scholarship as Corpus Christi 118.)

Dunstaple died on Christmas Eve 1453, as recorded in his epitaph in London's church of St Stephen Walbrook, where he was buried. (Note: The original St Stephen Walbrook was destroyed in the Great Fire of 1666)

== Music ==
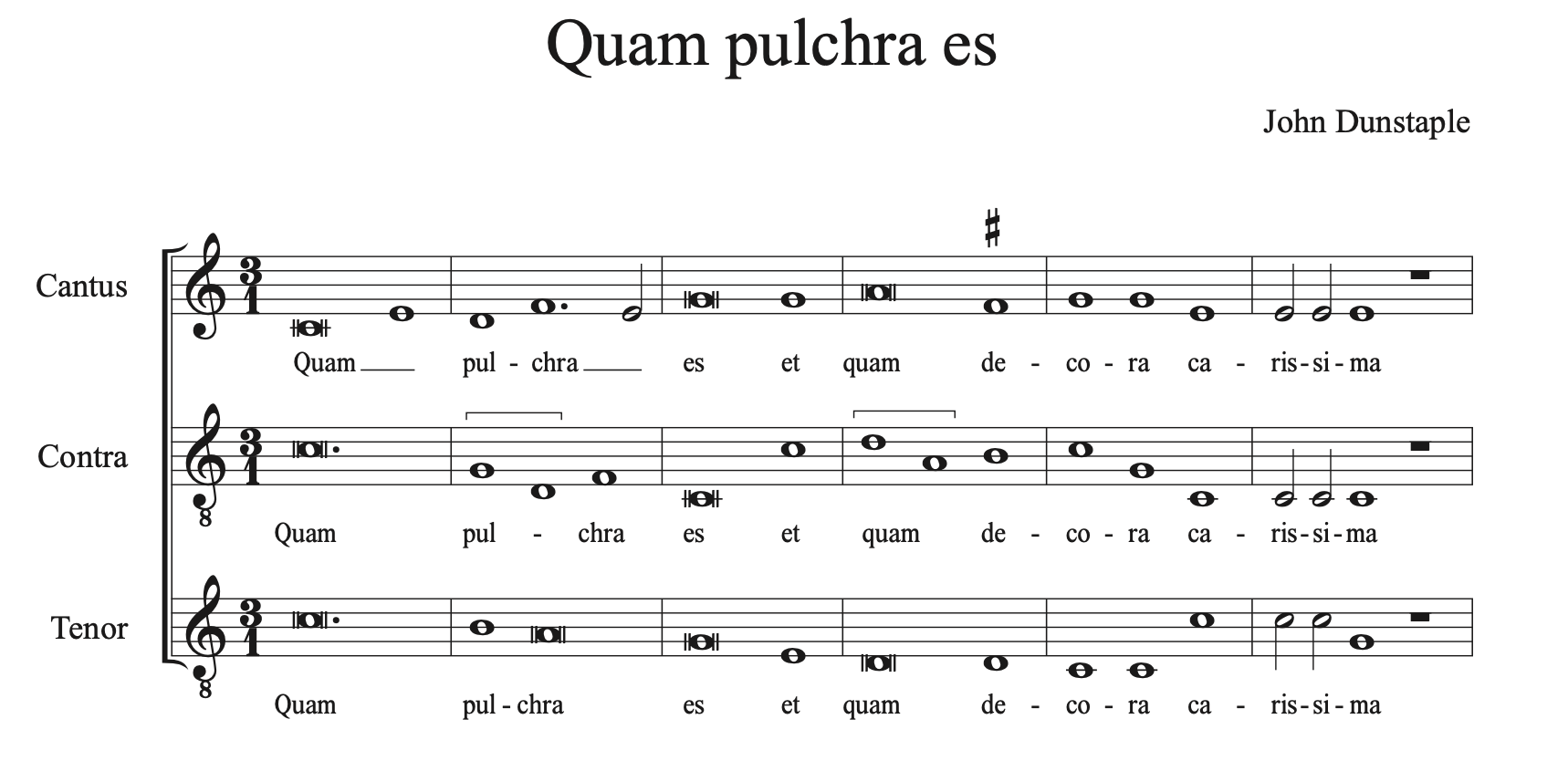
The opening line from Dunstaple's Quam pulchra es in modern notation

The musical output of medieval England was prodigious, yet almost all music manuscripts were destroyed during the English Reformation, particularly as a result of the Dissolution of the Monasteries in 1536–1540. As a result, most of Dunstaple's work has had to be recovered from continental sources (predominantly those from northern Italy and the southern Alps).

Because numerous copies of his works have been found in Italian and German manuscripts, his fame must have been widespread. Two problems face musicologists of the 15th century: first, determining which of the many surviving anonymous works were written by which composers and, second, unraveling conflicting attributions. This is made even more difficult for English composers such as Dunstaple: scribes in England frequently copied music without any ascription, rendering it immediately anonymous; and, while continental scribes were more assiduous in this regard, many works published in Dunstaple's name have other, potentially equally valid, attributions in different sources to other composers, including Gilles Binchois, John Forest and, Leonel Power.

Of the works attributed to him only about fifty survive, among which are two complete masses, three sets of connected mass sections, fourteen individual mass sections, twelve complete isorhythmic motets (including the famous one which combines the hymn Veni creator spiritus and the sequence Veni sancte spiritus, and the less well-known Albanus roseo rutilat mentioned above), as well as twenty-seven separate settings of various liturgical texts, including three Magnificats and seven settings of Marian antiphons, such as Alma redemptoris Mater and Salve Regina, Mater misericordiae. Dunstaple was one of the first to compose masses using a single melody as cantus firmus. A good example of this technique is his Missa Rex seculorum.

He is believed to have written secular music, but no songs in the vernacular can be attributed to him with any degree of certainty: although the French-texted rondeau Puisque m’amour is attributed to Dunstaple in two sources and there is no reason to doubt his authorship, the ballade remained the more favoured form for English secular song at this time and there is limited opportunity for comparison with the rest of his output. The popular melody "O rosa bella", once thought to be by Dunstaple, is now attributed to John Bedingham (or Bedyngham). Yet, because so much of the surviving 15th-century repertory of English carols is anonymous, and Dunstaple is known to have written many, most scholars consider it highly likely—for stylistic as well as statistical reasons—that some of the anonymous carols from this time are actually by Dunstaple.

== Influence ==
"They [Du Fay and Binchois] took on the guise
of the English and follow Dunstable
and thereby a marvelous pleasingness
makes their music joyous and remarkable." (Note: Translated from the original French: "Et ont prins de la contenance Angloise et ensuy Dunstable Pour quoy merveilleuse plaisance Rend leur chant joyeux et notable")

— Martin le Franc, Le Champion des Dames, before May 1488

Dunstaple's influence on the continent's musical vocabulary was enormous, particularly considering the relative paucity of his (attributable) works. He was recognized for possessing something never heard before in music of the Burgundian School: la contenance angloise ("the English countenance"), a term used by the poet Martin le Franc in his Le Champion des Dames. Le Franc added that the style influenced Dufay and Binchois—high praise indeed.

Writing a few decades later in about 1476, the Flemish composer and music theorist Tinctoris reaffirmed the powerful influence Dunstaple had, stressing the "new art" that Dunstaple had inspired. Tinctoris hailed Dunstaple as the fons et origo of the style, its "wellspring and origin."

The contenance angloise, while not defined by Martin le Franc, was probably a reference to Dunstaple's stylistic trait of using full triadic harmony, along with a liking for the interval of the third. Assuming that he had been on the continent with the Duke of Bedford, Dunstaple would have been introduced to French fauxbourdon; borrowing some of the sonorities, he created elegant harmonies in his own music using thirds and sixths. Taken together, these are seen as defining characteristics of early Renaissance music, and both Le Franc's and Tinctoris's comments suggest that many of these traits may have originated in England, taking root in the Burgundian School around the middle of the century.

== Editions ==
- Bukofzer, Manfred (1953). John Dunstable: Complete Works. London: Musica Britannica. ISBN 978-0-85249-408-0.
  - —— (1970). John Dunstable: Complete Works. Revised by Margaret Bent, Ian Bent and Brian Trowell. London: Musica Britannica.

== Recordings ==
- 1982 – John Dunstable – Motets, Hilliard Ensemble, dir. Paul Hillier EMI Reflexe 1467031, reissued with music of Leonel Power, on Veritas x2 50999 6 02493 2 6.
- 1996 – Dunstaple: Sacred Works, Orlando Consort. Metronome METCD1009.
- 2003 – Canticum Canticorum. In Praise of Love: The Song of Songs in the Renaissance. Capilla Flamenca. Eufoda 1359. Contains a recording of Quam pulchra es by John Dunstable
- 2005 – John Dunstable – Sweet Harmony – Masses and Motets, recorded by Tonus Peregrinus for the Naxos label.
- 2012 – O rosa bella Ave maris stella and Quam pulchra es by John Dunstaple have been recorded by the Lumina Vocal Ensemble
