= Jacobus Vide =

Franco-Flemish composer

Jacobus Vide (French: Jacques Vide; fl. 1405–1433) was a Franco-Flemish composer of the transitional period between the medieval period and early Renaissance. He was an early member of the Burgundian School, during the reigns of John the Fearless and Philip the Good.

The earliest mention of him is from the archives of the Cathedral of Notre Dame in Paris, in 1405, where he was probably a choirboy (some uncertainty exists with regard to the name). In 1410 he held a position at the church of St Donatian in Bruges, and around the same time he may have been a singer in the chapel of Antipope John XXIII. His service to the Burgundian court began sometime between then and 1423, when he was listed as a valet de chambre for Philip the Good, and in 1426 he was given charge of instructing and caring for two choirboys. In 1428 he was promoted to the position of secretary to Philip the Good. No records of his activity after 1433 have yet been discovered.

All eight of his surviving works are rondeaux, secular French songs which were a favorite of the Burgundians. They are somewhat unusual, in comparison to other music of the period, in their free use of dissonance, and in addition are marked by frequent use of cross-rhythms. All of the characteristic cadences of the period – the Landini cadence, the Burgundian cadence, and the V–I cadence where the lowest voice jumps an octave to avoid parallel fifths – are common in Vide's music.

One of his more enigmatic songs is a three-voice rondeau, "Las, j'ay perdu mon espincel", in which the upper voices, the superius and the tenor, are fully written out, but the contratenor is left blank. Since the manuscript was carefully prepared, it is probable that the missing part was deliberate, and was a pun on the song text "j'ay perdu mon" (I lost my ...), in which case the singer, likely trained to improvise as well as sing from score, would have had to fill in by himself on the spot.

== References and further reading ==
- Gustave Reese, Music in the Renaissance. New York, W.W. Norton & Co., 1954. ISBN 0-393-09530-4
- Wright, Craig. L. Macy (ed.). Jacobus Vide. Grove Music Online. (subscription required)
