= Fauxbourdon =

Musical harmonization technique

Fauxbourdon (also fauxbordon, and also commonly two words: faux bourdon or faulx bourdon, and in Italian falso bordone) – French for false drone – is a technique of musical harmonisation used in the late Middle Ages and early Renaissance, particularly by composers of the Burgundian School. Guillaume Du Fay was a prominent practitioner of the form (as was John Dunstaple), and may have been its inventor. The homophony and mostly parallel harmony allows the text of the mostly liturgical lyrics to be understood clearly. The term fauxbordon is also sometimes used to describe choral music where the melody is in the tenor part.

== Description ==
In its simplest form, fauxbourdon consists of the cantus firmus and two other parts a sixth and a perfect fourth below. To prevent monotony, or create a cadence, the lowest voice sometimes jumps down to the octave, and any of the accompanying voices may have minor embellishments. Usually just a small part of a composition employs the fauxbourdon technique.

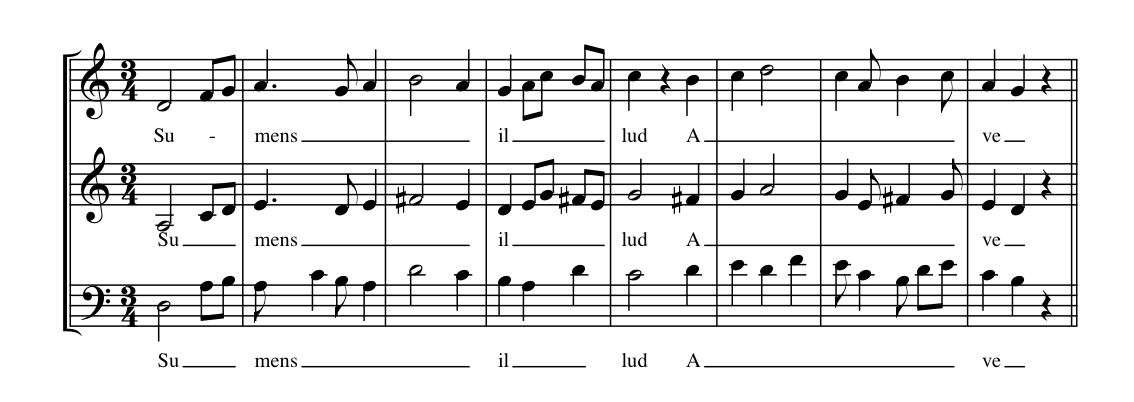
Example of fauxbourdon. This is a portion of Ave Maris Stella, a Marian Antiphon, in a setting by Guillaume Du Fay, transcribed into modern notation. The top and bottom lines are freely composed; the middle line, designated "fauxbourdon" in the original, follows the contours of the top line while always remaining exactly a perfect fourth below. The bottom line is often, but not always, a sixth below the top line; it is embellished, and reaches cadences on the octave.

== Hymn singing ==
In a hymn, the term is sometimes used when the congregation sings in parallel octaves, with some singers singing a descant over the melody, but the term was historically used to indicate an arrangement of the tune in four parts with the melody in the tenor voice, such as those composed by sixteenth- and seventeenth-century English composers including John Dowland, Giles Farnaby, and Thomas Ravenscroft.

== History ==
The earliest explicit example of fauxbourdon may be in the manuscript I-BC Q15 (Bologna, Museo Internazionale e Biblioteca della Musica, MS Q15), compiled around 1435, which contains several examples, including one by Du Fay dating probably to around 1430. Since many early 15th century compositions are anonymous, and dating is often problematic, exact determination of the authorship of the earliest fauxbourdon is difficult. Du Fay's contribution to this collection contains the first actual use of the term, in the closing part of his Missa Sancti Jacobi. It is possible that his use of the word "bourdon" was intended as a pun on St. James' "staff" (which Du Fay, or the copyist, drew in miniature above the music). Cividale, Museo Civico MS 101 has a work "O salutaris hostia" (f. 82v) which seems to be a work of fauxbourdon, but not labelled as such.

The earliest definitely datable example of fauxbourdon is in a motet by Du Fay, Supremum est mortalibus, which was written for the treaty reconciling the differences between Pope Eugene IV and Sigismund, after which Sigismund was crowned as Holy Roman Emperor, which happened on 31 May 1433. In this motet, which is for four voices, when the tenor—the lowest voice—drops out, the upper three voices proceed in fauxbourdon.

Even though its first use appears to have been in Italy, fauxbourdon was to become a defining characteristic of the Burgundian style which flourished in the Low Countries through the middle of the 15th century. Composers such as Gilles Binchois, Antoine Busnois, and Johannes Brassart all frequently used the technique, always adapting it to their personal styles.

A related, but separate, development took place in England in the 15th century, called faburden. While superficially similar, especially in that it involved chains of 6–3 chords with octave-fifth consonances at the ends of phrases, faburden was a schematic method of harmonization of an existing chant; in the case of faburden, the chant was in the middle voice.

== See also ==
- Falsobordone: a type of singing related by name, but only slightly in style
- Forró: a Brazilian music genre whose name is derived (indirectly) from fauxbourdon
