= O Rosa Bella =

"O rosa bella" is the title of two popular 15th century chansons, the earlier composed by Johannes Ciconia and the latter originally attributed to John Dunstaple, but now to John Bedyngham (Fallows 1994). The text is based on a poem written by Leonardo Giustiniani (1388–1446).

The text of the first verse is:

O rosa bella,
O dolce anima mia
Non mi lassar morire
In cortesia, in cortesia.

Stanley Sadie in the Cambridge Music Guide gives as translation:

O lovely rose
My sweet soul
Let me not die
In courtly love

The chanson was used as a basis for several other works, including that by Johannes Ockeghem, and masses attributed to Gilles Joye; however, Johannes Ciconia's early version shares the words but not the tune (McComb n.d.).

== Recordings ==
- O rosa bella: English and Continental Music from the Late Gothic Period: Clemencic Consort / René Clemencic (Arte Nova 59210)
