= Prolation =

Form of musical rhythmic structure

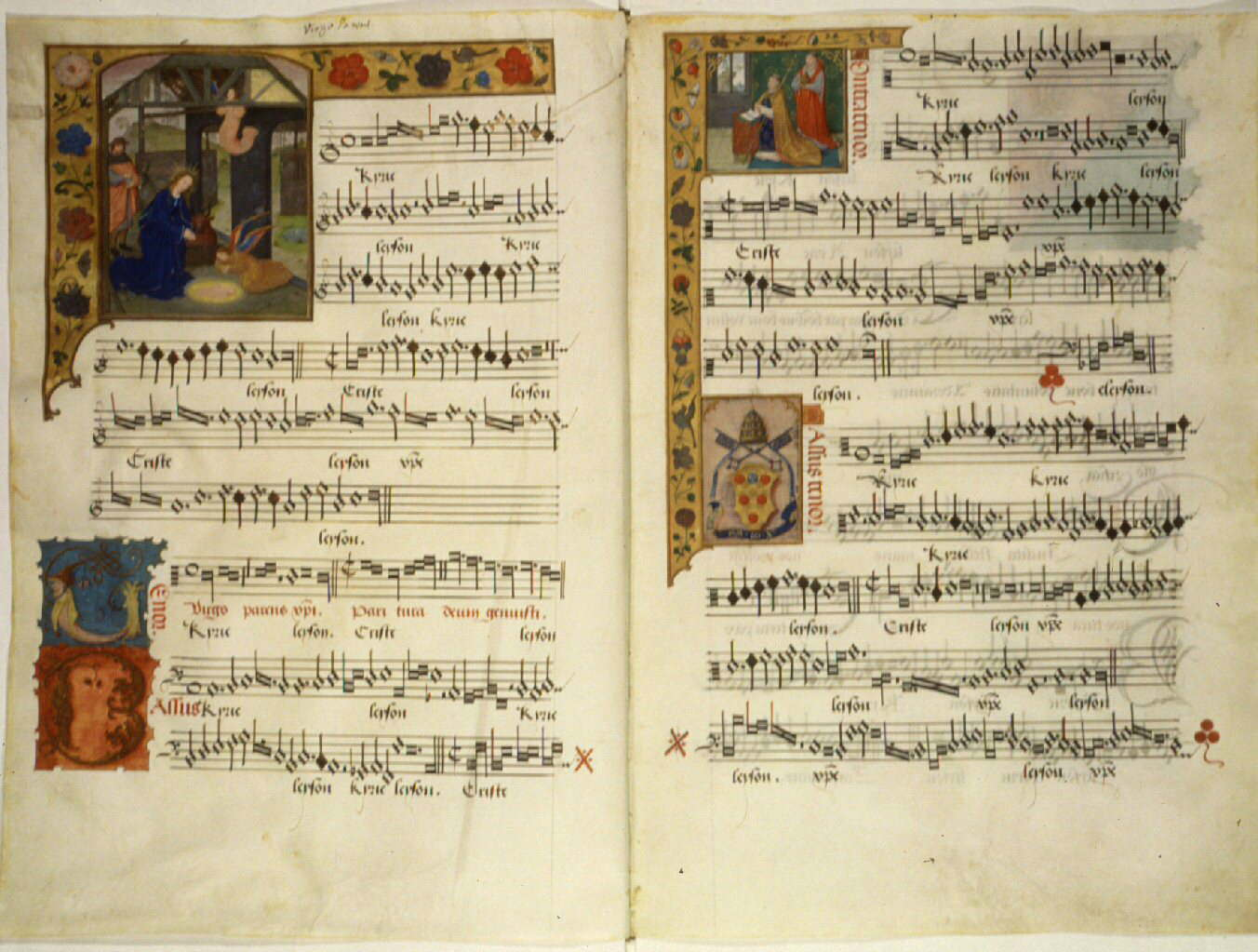
A 16th-century manuscript of a Kyrie by Jacques Barbireau, written using mensural notation

In mensural notation, prolation (Latin: prolatio) is used to describe the rhythmic structure of medieval and Renaissance music. The term is used to the division of the semibreve, and corresponds roughly to the concept of time signature in modern music. Time (Latin: tempus) is used in mensural notation to describe larger scale rhythmic structures.

The division of semibreves by three into minims is called prolatio maior; binary division is called prolatio minor. The symbols used to denote the prolation and tempus were 𝇇, 𝇈, 𝇊 and 𝇋.

== Description ==
In mensural notation, prolation (also called prolatio) describes the rhythmic structure of medieval and Renaissance music on a small scale. The term is derived from the Medieval Latin word prolatio (meaning "bearing" or "manner"), first used by the medieval French composer Philippe de Vitry in describing Ars Nova, a musical style that arose in 14th-century France.

Prolation corresponds roughly to the concept of time signature in modern music. Prolation describes whether a semibreve is equal in length to two minims (minor prolation or imperfect prolation; in Latin prolatio minor) or, like a tuplet, three minims (major prolation or perfect prolation; in Latin prolatio maior).

Early medieval music was often structured in subdivisions of three, while the note values in modern music are most often subdivided into two parts, 4/4 being the most common time signature, meaning that minor prolation has primarily survived in our time signature system, while major prolation has been replaced by notation modifying note values with dots or triplets. The history of written medieval music shows a gradual shift from major to minor prolation being common.

== Tempus and divisio ==
Whereas the term prolation is used to describe the rhythmic structure on a small scale, tempus (or 'time') describes the division of the breve, which is on a larger scale. As with prolation, tempus also corresponds roughly to the modern concept of time signature, and describes the relationship between the breve and semibreve.

The equivalent term in the Italian notation of the 14th century is divisio, which covers both tempus and prolation. Italian divisiones, first described by the medieval composer and theorist Marchetto da Padova, can also allow four minims within a semibreve. For instance, octonaria and duodenaria place eight and twelve minims in a breve respectively, divided into two or three 'major' semibreves.

Mensuration
| Tempus | Prolation | Sign | (Image) | Semibreves | Minims | Modern equivalent |
|---|---|---|---|---|---|---|
| perfectum | maior | 𝇇 | Circle with dot | three semibreves | three groups of three minims | 9/8 |
| perfectum | minor | 𝇈 | Circle without dot | three semibreves | three groups of two minims | 3/4 |
| imperfectum | maior | 𝇊 | Semicircle with dot | two semibreves | two groups of three minims | 6/8 |
| imperfectum | minor | 𝇋 | Semicircle without dot | two semibreves | four minims | 2/4 |

== Sources ==
- Hughes, Anselm, ed. (1960). New Oxford History of Music. Vol. 3: Ars Nova and the Renaissance 1300 - 1540. London: Oxford University Press. OCLC 715238641.
