= Guillaume Malbecque =

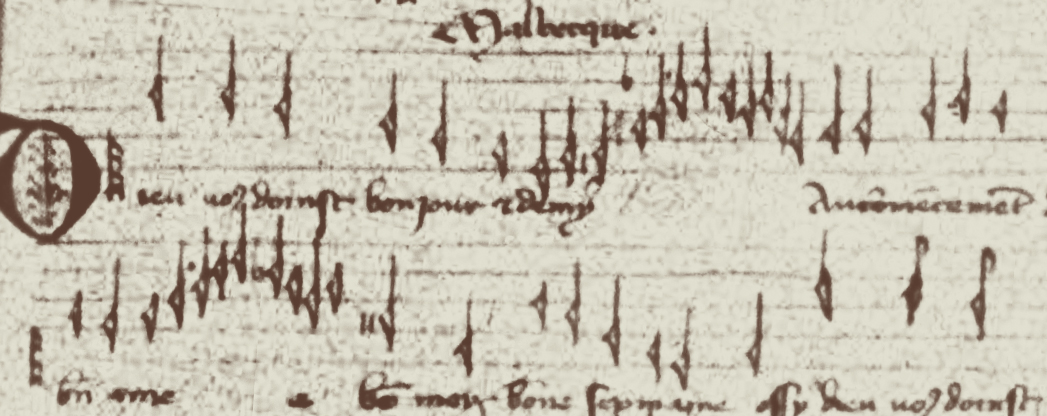
Score of Guillaume Malbecque

Guillaume Malbecque (c. 1400 – 29 August 1465 in Soignies) was a Flemish composer. Malbecque may indicate his place of birth. He was an associate of Guillaume Dufay at Cambrai, a former singer in the papal chapel, and in his last years together with Gilles Binchois and Johannes Regis at Soignies.

== Works ==
Surviving works in the Bodleian Library manuscript include:

- Adieu vous di, mes seigneurs et amis
- Quant de la belle me parti
- Dieu vous doinst bon jour
