= Guillaume le Rouge =

Guillaume Le Rouge (G. Le Rouge or W(illelmus) de Rouge; fl. 1450–1465) was a Netherlands musician of the Burgundian school. He took a position at the court of Charles d'Orléans, serving in the chapel from 1451 to 1465. One song remains of his compositions, Se je fais duel je n’en ouis mais.
