= Jean Cousin (composer) =

Jean Escatefer dit Cousin (before 1425 – after 1474) was a French or Flemish singer and composer of the Burgundian School and a member of the royal chapel from about 1461.

== Life and career ==
Jean Cousin served with Johannes Ockeghem and eleven other singers in the chapel of Charles I, Duke of Bourbon from 1446 to 1448 at his chapel in Moulins. Between 1448 and 1461, Cousin was employed in the orchestra at the French court, and perhaps as early as 1452, as Ockeghem at this time became an employee of the French king. It was not until 1461, however, that Cousin is recorded as a member of the court orchestra. At the funeral of Charles VII, he was given a robe.

King Louis XI asked the Pope for Ockeghem, Cousin and other members of the royal chapel to receive three benefices, which the Pope provided in his Bull of December 5, 1463. Until at least 1474, Cousin served as a singer and priest of the French king, and by 1473 he had reached third place in the hierarchy of the orchestra. It is unclear when his employment was ended due to loss of the court orchestra bills for the period after 1474.

Cousin was recorded as taking part in the Tours city election assemblies in 1463-1464.

== Works ==
Of Cousin's works, only the Missa tubae has survived. Missa Nigra sum mentioned in 1473 by Johannes Tinctoris seems to be lost.
