= Legrand (surname) =

Legrand or Le Grand is a French surname. It may refer to:

- Arthur Legrand (1833–1916), French lawyer, public servant and politician
- Augustin Legrand, French actor
- Chip Le Grand, Australian sports journalist
- Claude Legrand (1762-1815), French general
- Clay LeGrand, American judge
- Connie LeGrand, American motorsports journalist
- Daniel Legrand (1783–1859), Swiss industrialist and philanthropist
- Edwin O. LeGrand (1801–1861), Texas Revolution figure
- Eric LeGrand (born 1990), American football player
- Fedde Le Grand (born 1977), Dutch DJ and producer
- François Legrand, pseudonym of Franz Antel, Austrian filmmaker
- François Legrand (climber) (born 1970), French rock climber
- Homer Eugene Le Grand (1944–2017), American-Australian historian of science
- Jacques Legrand (Mongolist) (born 1946), French linguist and anthropologist
- Jacques Legrand (philatelist) (1820–1912), French philatelist
- Jacques Legrand (resistance leader) (1906–1944), French Resistance leader
- Julie Legrand, British actress
- London LeGrand (born 1966), American singer of the band Brides of Destruction
- Louis Legrand (artist) (1863–1951), French artist
- Louis Legrand (theologian) (1711–1780), French priest and theologian
- Marc-Antoine Legrand (1673–1728), French actor and playwright
- Mercédès Legrand (1893–1945) Spanish-born Belgian painter, poet
- Michel Legrand (1932–2019), French composer, arranger, conductor and pianist
- Mirtha Legrand, Argentine actress and TV personality
- Paul Legrand (1816–1898), French mime
- Pierre le Grand (pirate), 17th-century Caribbean buccaneer
- Richard LeGrand (1882–1963), American actor
- Silvia Legrand (1927–2020), Argentine actress, twin sister of Mirtha Legrand

== See also ==
- Legrant, a variant
