= Bergerette =

Form of early rustic French song

A bergerette, or shepherdess' air, is a form of early rustic French song.

The bergerette, developed by Burgundian composers, is a virelai with only one stanza. It is one of the formes fixes of early French song and related to the rondeau. Examples include Josquin's Bergerette savoyene included in Petrucci's Odhecaton (1501).
