= Johannes de Limburgia =

Johannes de Limburgia (also Johannes de Lymburgia or Johannes Vinandi; fl. 1408–1430) was a Franco-Flemish School composer.

== History ==
His name indicates that he is from the Duchy of Limburg (or perhaps the city itself). He worked at churches in Liège in 1408–19, was succentor at Saint-Jean-l'Évangéliste there in 1426, and in Italy c. 1430, perhaps in Venice, or Vicenza and/or Padua, for which cities he wrote motets. Like Arnold and Hugo de Lantins he stands out among his contemporaries by virtue of the large number of his surviving works: about 50 in the Q15 Manuscript (Bologna, International museum and library of music) and a Mass Ordinary in the Trent Codices.
