= Johannes Brassart =

Flemish composer

Johannes Brassart (also known as Jehan Brassart or Jean Brassart) (c. 1400 – before 22 October 1455) was a Flemish composer of the early-Renaissance Burgundian school. Of his output, only sacred vocal music has survived, and it typifies early-15th-century practice.

== Life ==
He was most likely born in the village of Lauw near Tongeren in the prince-bishopric of Liège (now in the province of Limburg, Belgium), though the date is only known approximately. From 1422 to 1431 he worked at the collegiate church of St John the Evangelist in Liège, where he was a succentor. In the mid-1420s he visited Rome, moving there in 1431, where he was employed in the papal chapel as a singer and probably as a composer as well; he was in the choir at the same time as composers Arnold de Lantins and Guillaume Dufay. During this period Brassart most likely composed the motet O flos fragrans, which was popular enough to appear in several manuscripts of the time, as well as Te dignitas presularis.

In 1432 Brassart went to Basel, where he was a singer at the council chapel, and two years later Emperor Sigismund employed him as rector of the chapel, a post which he retained until 1443. In 1445 he moved to Liège, where he had a post at the collegiate church of St. Paul. A notice of 22 October 1455 of a supplication for his benefice there indicates he had recently died.

== Music and influence ==
Survival of music from this age is spotty, and many sources of music from Liège were destroyed when Charles the Bold sacked the city in 1468. Nevertheless, some of Brassart's music has survived, including 11 motets, 8 introits, and many individual mass movements.

His music is typical of the early Burgundian style, using fauxbourdon techniques (frequent 6-3 parallelism in two voices singing above the principal melody part in the tenor voice), isorhythm, and the Burgundian under-third cadence. All of his surviving music is sacred, and includes mass movements, introits, and numerous motets; one of his pieces is on a German text, and almost certainly was written during his employment with the Imperial chapel. Often he used cantus firmus techniques, and frequently wrote with the melodic part in the top voice.

The introits are among the earliest known polyphonic settings of this section of the Proper of the Mass.

The mass movements, all for three voices, most often employ the fauxbourdon style, while the motets are typically isorhythmic. Many of the motets are for four voices. One of the distinguishing features of his motet style is the frequent use of an opening duet for two high voices, after which the remaining voices join in; this was to become a hallmark of the Burgundian style. His most famous motet, O flos fragrans, is modeled on a similar work by Dufay, and the two composers may have known each other well.

== References and further reading ==
- Keith E. Mixter: "Johannes Brassart", in The New Grove Dictionary of Music and Musicians, ed. Stanley Sadie. 20 vols. London, Macmillan Publishers Ltd., 1980. ISBN 1-56159-174-2
- Gustave Reese, Music in the Renaissance. New York, W.W. Norton & Co., 1954. ISBN 0-393-09530-4
- Peter Wright, "Brassart, Johannes", Grove Music Online, ed. L. Macy. Accessed 28 October 2010 (This article is completely rewritten from the 1980 Grove article, but each contains useful information not found in the other)
