= John Bedyngham =

John Bedingham (also Bedyngham, Bedyngeham, Bodigham, Bellingan, Benigun, ?Boddenham; d. 1459/60) was an English early Renaissance composer.

Bedingham was a member of the London Guild of Parish Clerks by 1449, keeping his membership until his death. In 1458 he was described in a legal document as verger at St Stephen's Chapel, Westminster. Bedingham can perhaps be identified with a John Boddenham, born in Oxford in 1422, student at Winchester College and New College, Oxford. A sixteenth-century manuscript refers to him as 'Mr: Jo: bedyngham', and this title (magister) may support such an identification.

Bedingham has suffered some misattributions: the 'cherished Italian song' (as P.W. Christoffersen has called it) O Rosa Bella was thought to have been by John Dunstaple, and 'So ys emprentid' is still ascribed by some to be by Walter Frye (who based a Kyrie on it). Although Bedingham probably never left England, his music found its way into various Continental manuscripts, and David Fallows wrote that if all the music ascribed to him was actually by him, "Bedyngham must be accounted one of the more important composers of the mid-15th century."
