= Reinhard Strohm =

English musicologist

Professor Reinhard Strohm FBA (born 4 August 1942, Munich) is a German musicologist based largely in the United Kingdom, with an interest in 14th to 18th-century music.

Strohm studied Musicology, Medieval Latin, and Romance Literatures, at LMU Munich, Scuola Normale Superiore di Pisa, and Technische Universität Berlin (TU Berlin) during 1961–1969. He earned his Ph.D. degree at TU Berlin in 1971, with Carl Dahlhaus, producing a dissertation titled “Italienische Opernarien des frühen Settecento (1720–1730).

Strohm taught at King's College London during 1975–1983 and 1990–1996 as a lecturer, then a reader, and finally a professor. Between these two periods, he was Professor of Musicology at Yale University in the United States. He was the Heather Professor of Music at Oxford University during 1996–2007.

Between 1970–1982, Strohm was a co-editor for an edition of works by Richard Wagner (Richard-Wagner-Gesamtausgabe). Strohm won the 2012 Balzan Prize for Musicology.

Strohm is a Fellow of the British Academy (since 1993) and an Emeritus Professor of Music at Wadham College, Oxford.

== Selected bibliography ==
- Strohm, Reinhard (2005). The Rise of European Music, 1380-1500. Cambridge: Cambridge University Press. ISBN 978-0-521-61934-9.
- Strohm, Reinhard (2008). The Operas of Antonio Vivaldi. Fondazione Giorgio Cini; Istituto italiano Antonio Vivalde. Firenze: L.S.Olschki. ISBN 978-8-822-25682-9
- Strohm, Reinhard (2018). Studies on a Global History of Music: A Balzan Musicology Project. Abingdon-on-Thames: Taylor & Francis. ISBN 978-1-138-05883-5.
- Strohm Reinhard (2019). The Music Road, Coherence and Diversity in Music from the Mediterranean to India. Proceedings of the British Academy. Oxford University Press. ISBN 9780197266564
- Strohm, Reinhard (2021). Transcultural Music History : global participation and regional diversity in the modern age. Verlag für Wissenschaft und Bildung, Berlin. ISBN 978-3-86135-656-1
