= Tourdion =

French Renaissance dance

The tourdion (or tordion) (from the French verb "tordre" / to twist) is a lively dance, similar in nature to the galliard, and popular from the mid-15th to the late-16th centuries, first in the Burgundian court and then all over the French kingdom. The dance was accompanied frequently by the basse danse, due to their contrasting tempi, and were danced alongside the pavane and galliard, and the allemande and courante, also in pairs.

The Swedish choir Harmonica sings a tourdion ("Quand je bois du vin clairet").

In a triple meter, the tourdion's "was nearly the same as the Galliard, but the former was more rapid and smooth than the latter". Pierre Attaingnant published several tourdions in his first publication of collected dances in 1530, which contains, as the sixth and seventh items, a basse dance entitled "La Magdalena" with a following tourdion (it was only in 1949 that César Geoffray arranged this "following" tourdion as a four-voice chanson, by adding the lyrics "Quand je bois du vin clairet..."). Thoinot Arbeau later documented information about the tourdion in his work Orchésographie (Orchesography, pp. 49–57), published in 1589.

== Dance elements ==
Nearly all variations on the dance are based upon the simple cinq pas (five step) tourdion. The cinq pas begins in either a posture droit or posture gauche (the former with the right foot slightly in front, the latter with the left), with weight evenly distributed between the feet. Assuming a posture gauche, a pied en l'air droit and a petit saut follow in one beat, that is, a small kick of the right foot into the air at the same time as a slight hop as to land with the left foot (It should be remembered that all pieds en l'air are accompanied by the petit saut of the opposite foot.).

The step is repeated as a pied en l'air gauche, with the left foot kicked into the air and a slight hop to land upon the right. The two steps are then repeated, with care that the kicks are small (as the dance is brisk). Following the four kicks, one performs a saut moyen—a small jump into the air that pulls the feet into the posture gauche or droit—whichever is the opposite of the first. This combination of the saut moyen and the posture is typically called a cadence.

The process repeats, mirrored to reflect the new starting posture, until the song ends.
