= Guillaume Legrant =

French composer

Guillaume Legrant (Guillaume Lemacherier, Le Grant) (fl. 1405–1449) was a French composer of the early Renaissance, active in Flanders, Italy, and France. He was one of the first composers in writing polyphony to distinguish between passages for solo and multiple voices on each part.

== Life and music ==
Nothing is known about his early life, but his real name (Lemacherier) suggests a French origin. His first appearance in church records is in 1405, when he was a singer at Bourges. In 1407 he became a chaplain there, and he remained in Bourges until 1410. The next eight years contain no record of his activities, but he was in Rome by October 1418, at which time he entered the papal chapel as a singer, at that time under Pope Martin V; he stayed there until 1421. While no musical activity of his has been documented in France, he had been given benefices there, in the diocese of Rouen. Since he kept at least one until 1449 he is presumed to have still been alive then.

Legrant's music is collected in Volume 11 of the Corpus mensurabilis musicae. Seven pieces survive, of which three are sacred, and the rest secular. The sacred music includes two settings of the Credo of the Mass, and one setting of the Gloria; these are the pieces in which he makes a distinction between solo and full chorus in the polyphonic parts.

All of his surviving secular works are in the form of the virelai, one of the formes fixes. Most of the composers of the period wrote in another of formes fixes, the rondeau, but Legrant seems to have preferred the virelai, which had been set widely the century before. By 1420 few composers are known to have been writing virelais, suggesting that Legrant's compositions may predate 1420 (the virelai was to return to favor later in the 15th century, in the music of Antoine Busnois and Johannes Ockeghem).

== Works ==
Virelais (all for three voices)

- Pour l'amour de mon bel amy
- Ma chiere mestresse et amye
- Or avant, gentilz fillettes
- La doulce flour (rendered in CMM as an instrumental piece)

Mass movements (all for three voices)

- Gloria
- Credo (I)
- Credo (II)
