= Johannes Tinctoris =

Renaissance music theorist and composer (1435–1511)

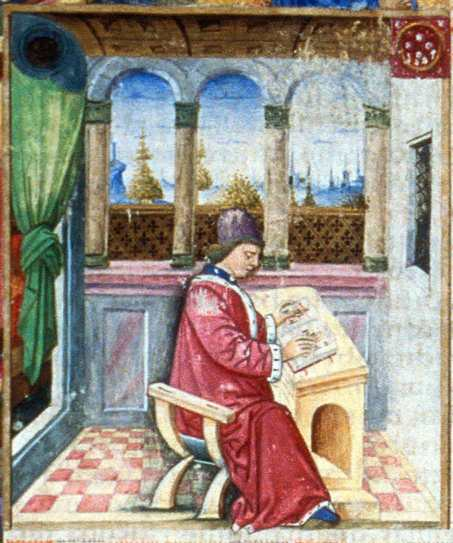
Portrait of Tinctoris, from the title page of the ms 835, 15th-16th century, Biblioteca Universitaria de Valencia

Jehan le Taintenier or Jean Teinturier (Latinised as Johannes Tinctoris; also Jean de Vaerwere; c. 1435 – 1511) was a Renaissance music theorist and composer from the Low Countries. Up to his time, he is perhaps the most significant European writer on music since Guido of Arezzo.

== Life and career ==
He is known to have studied in Orléans, and to have been master of the choir there; he also may have been director of choirboys at Chartres. Because he was paid through the office of petites vicars at Cambrai Cathedral for four months in 1460, it has been speculated that he studied with Du Fay, who spent the last part of his life there; certainly Tinctoris must at least have known the elder Burgundian there. Tinctoris went to Naples about 1472 and spent most of the rest of his life in Italy.

Tinctoris was also known as a cleric, a poet, a mathematician, and a lawyer; there is even one reference to him as an accomplished painter.

== Works ==
Tinctoris published many volumes of writings on music. While they are not particularly original, borrowing heavily from ancient writers (including Boethius, Isidore of Seville, and others) they give an impressively detailed record of the technical practices and procedures used by composers of the day. He wrote the first dictionary of musical terms (Terminorum musicae diffinitorium); a book on the characteristics of the musical modes; a treatise on proportions; and three books on counterpoint, which is particularly useful in charting the development of voice-leading and harmony in the transitional period between Du Fay and Josquin. The writings by Tinctoris were influential on composers and other music theorists for the remainder of the Renaissance.

While not much of the music of Tinctoris has survived, that which has survived shows a love for complex, smoothly flowing polyphony, as well as a liking for unusually low tessituras, occasionally descending in the bass voice to the C two octaves below middle C (showing an interesting similarity to Ockeghem in this regard). Tinctoris wrote masses, motets and a few chansons.

== Tinctoris' eight rules of composition ==
From his third book on counterpoint.

Rule #1 Begin and finish with perfect consonance. It is, however, not wrong if the singer is improvising a counterpoint and ends with imperfect consonance, but in that case, the movement should be many-voiced. Sixth or octave doubling of the bass is not allowed.

Rule #2 Follow together with tenor up and down in imperfect and perfect consonances of the same kind. (Parallels at the third and sixth are recommended, fifth and octave parallels are forbidden.)

Rule #3 If ténor remains on the same note, you can add both perfect and imperfect consonances.

Rule #4 The counterpointed part should have a melodic closed form even if ténor makes big leaps.

Rule #5 Do not put cadence on a pitch which would confuse the mode.

Rule #6 It is forbidden to repeat the same melodic turn above a cantus firmus, especially if the cantus firmus contains that same repetition.

Rule #7 Avoid two or more consecutive cadences of the same pitch even if cantus firmus allows it.

Rule #8 In all counterpoint, aim for manifoldness and variety by altering measure, tempo, and cadences and varying the use syncopes, imitations, canons, and pauses; sometimes with, sometimes without. Keep in mind that an ordinary chanson uses fewer different styles than a motet and a motet uses fewer different styles than a mass.

== Musical Compositions ==
=== Sacred music ===
Masses:

- Missa sine nomine #1 (3 v)
- Missa sine nomine #2
- Missa sine nomine #3 (missing Kyrie and Agnus Dei)
- Missa L'homme armé

Motets:

- O Virgo miserere mei
- Virgo Dei throno digna
- Alleluya
- Fecit potentiam
- Lamentatio Jeremiae

=== Secular music ===
- Helas
- Vostre regart
- O invida fortuna
- Le souvenir (4v)
- Le souvenir (2v)
- Tout a par moy
- De tous biens playne
- D'ung aultre amer
- Comme femme

== Notable writings ==
- the first dictionary of musical terms (Diffinitorum musices, c. 1475)
- an introduction to the elements of musical pitch and rhythmic notation (Expositio manus and Proportionale musices); examples show how rhythmically elaborate extemporization may have been practiced
- a thorough exposition of the modal system (Liber de natura et proprietate tonorum)
- Liber de arte contrapuncti – his main exposition of intervals, consonance and dissonance, and their usage. He devised strict rules for introducing dissonances, limiting them to unstressed beats and syncopations (suspensions) and at cadences.
- a broad survey of the origins and evolution of music, its theological and metaphysical roots and ramifications, and vocal and instrumentation practice (De inventione et usu musice).

=== Writings ===
- Tinctoris, Johannes, Liber de arte contrapuncti, tr. Oliver Strunk, in Source Readings in Music History. New York, W.W. Norton & Co., 1950.
- Tinctoris, Johannes, Opus musices. Naples, c. 1483. Digitized codex at Somni
- Tinctoris, Johanni, Opera Omnia, Corpus Mensurabilis Musicae 18, ed. William Melan, American Institute of Musicology, 1976
