= Formes fixes =

French poetic forms

The formes fixes (French: [fɔʁm fiks]; singular: forme fixe, "fixed form") are the three 14th- and 15th-century French poetic forms: the ballade, rondeau, and virelai. Each was also a musical form, generally a chanson, and all consisted of a complex pattern of repetition of verses and a refrain with musical content in two main sections.

All three forms can be found in 13th-century sources, but a 15th-century source gives Philippe de Vitry as their first composer while the first comprehensive repertory of these forms was written by Guillaume de Machaut. The formes fixes stopped being used in music around the end of the 15th century, although their influence continued (in poetry they, especially the rondeau, continued to be used).

Sometimes forms from other countries and periods are referred to as formes fixes. These include the Italian 14th-century madrigal and later ballata and barzelletta, the German bar form, Spanish 13th-century cantiga, and the later canción, and villancico.
