= Tra quante regione =

Tra quante regione ("Amongst all the regions") is a ballata by the late medieval and early renaissance composer Hugo de Lantins. As with another vocal composition by Guillaume Dufay entitled Vasilissa ergo gaude, Lantins' ballata celebrated the marriage of the Italian princess Cleofa Malatesta with the Byzantine Despot of the Morea Theodore II Palaiologos. The marriage took place on 21 January 1421 or sometime in 1422 in Mystra. The actual date and place of the first performance remain disputed

Tra quante regione el sol si mobele
Gira e reguarda cum intiera fede
Quanti ti, Sparta, beata non vede.

Amongst all the regions the sun so mobile
revolving views with good faith,
he sees, O Sparta, none so happy as thee.

Tu fosti albergo di Elena regina,
Che per tanto che fe
Stancho le force de che scripse may

Thou wast the home of Queen Helen,
who by all that she did
wore out the strength of all who ever wrote

Ora possedi cosa piu divina
Madona Cleophe
De Malatesti, nata come say.

Now thou possessest a diviner thing,
Madona Cleofe dei Malatesti,
whose birth thou knowest.

Quest'en le lode e le possance c'hay
Gionto a l' impero de Constantinopele
Cum tanta baronia si grande e nobele.

These are the praises and powers thou hast
added to the empire of Constantinople
with so mighty a lordship, so great and noble.
