= Richard Loqueville =

Medieval and Renaissance French composer

Richard Loqueville (died 1418) was a French composer active during the transition between Medieval and Renaissance music. A musician at Cambrai Cathedral, Loqueville was a harpist and teacher, whose students included Edward III, Duke of Bar and the influential composer Guillaume Du Fay.

== Life and career ==
Little is known of Loqueville's life. A trained harpist, he taught it to Edward III, the son of the Robert, Duke of Bar, in 1410. He is also known to have taught plainsong to the Duke's choirboys. From 1413 until the end of his life he taught music at Cambrai Cathedral alongside Nicolas Malin. The celebrated composer Guillaume Du Fay was likely a student his student at the cathedral and Du Fay's first compositions were probably written under his influence and instruction. He is known to have been married. In 1418 he died in Cambrai.

== Music ==
Attributed to him are four rondeaux, a ballade, an isorhythmic motet in honour of the Breton saint Yvo, a Marian motet, and several Mass movements.

== Works ==
List of compositions by Richard Loqueville
Title	No. of voices	Genre	CMM
Gloria, Credo	3	Gloria in excelsis Deo/Credo	R
Gloria	3	Gloria in excelsis Deo	R
Gloria	3	Gloria in excelsis Deo	R
Sanctus (Note: with trope ‘Qui januas mortis’)	4	Sanctus	R 10
O flos in divo/Sacris pignoribus	3	Isorhythmic motet	R 11
O regina clementissima	3	Antiphon	R 12
Quant compaignons	3	Ballade	R 5
Je vous pri	3	Rondeau refrain	R 1
Pour mesdisans	3	Rondeau	R 4
Puisque je suy amoureux	3	Rondeau	R 3
Qui ne veroit que vos deulx yeux	3	Rondeau	R 2

=== Editions ===
Loqueville's works are included in the following collections:

- Reaney, Gilbert, ed. (1966). Early Fifteenth-Century Music. Corpus mensurabilis musicae 11. Vol. 3, Collected Works of Richard Loqueville, Estienne Grossin, R. Libert, and Benoit. Cambridge: American Institute of Musicology. OCLC 679376469.

== Sources ==
Books

- Boone, Graeme MacDonald (1987). Dufay's Early Chansons: Chronology and Style in the Manuscript Oxford, Bodleian Library, Canonici Misc. 213 (Thesis). Cambridge, Massachusetts: Harvard University. OCLC 606319163.
- Fallows, David (1987) [1982]. Dufay. The Master Musicians Series (revised ed.). Oxford: Oxford University Press. ISBN 978-0-460-02493-8.
- Fenlon, Iain (2009). Early Music History: Studies in Medieval and Early Modern Music. Cambridge, England: Cambridge University Press. ISBN 978-0-521-10431-9.
- Guion, David M. (2010). A History of the Trombone. Lanham, Maryland: Scarecrow Press. ISBN 978-0-8108-7445-9.
- Kim, Mi-Ock (1990). The Emergence of Harmonic Tonality in Dufay's Songs (Thesis). East Lansing, Michigan: Michigan State University. OCLC 215004828.
- McKinnon, James, ed. (1990). Antiquity and the Middle Ages: From Ancient Greece to the 15th Century. London, England: Palgrave Macmillan. ISBN 978-1-349-21157-9.
- Moll, Kevin N., ed. (2014). Counterpoint and Compositional Process in the Time of Dufay: Perspectives from German Musicology. Oxford, England: Taylor & Francis. ISBN 978-1-135-61733-2.
- Strohm, Reinhard (2005). The Rise of European Music, 1380-1500. Cambridge, England: Cambridge University Press. ISBN 978-0-521-61934-9.

Journals and articles

- Arlt, Wulf [in German] (1973). "The Development of French Secular Music during the Fourteenth Century". Musica Disciplina. 27: 41–59. JSTOR 20532157.
- Planchart, Alejandro (1993). "The Early Career of Guillaume Du Fay". Journal of the American Musicological Society. 46 (3): 341–368. doi:10.2307/831925. JSTOR 831925.
- Reaney, Gilbert (2001). "Loqueville, Richard". Grove Music Online. Oxford, England: Oxford University Press. doi:10.1093/gmo/9781561592630.article.16976. ISBN 978-1-56159-263-0. (subscription, Wikilibrary access, or UK public library membership required)
