= Gilet Velut =

French Renaissance composer

Gilet Velut (fl. early 15th century) was a French composer of the early Renaissance.

== Life and career ==
Velut was a petit vicaire ('little vicar') at Cambrai Cathedral from 1409 through 1411. He went with Charlotte of Bourbon to Cyprus in 1411; serving in the role of a chaplain. Nothing else is known for certain about the life of this composer.

== Music ==
Vilet has been suggested as the composer for all secular music in the Codex Cyprius.

== Works ==
List of compositions by Gilet Velut
| Title | No. of voices | Genre | Manuscript source: Folios (Note: "v" and "r" stand for verso and recto respectively; in left-right language books, verso is the front page while recto is the back page.) | Reaney |
|---|---|---|---|---|
| Gloria | 3 | Gloria | I-Bc Q.15: 111v–112r | R 127 |
| Credo | 3 | Credo | I-Bc Q.15: 33v–35r | R 132 |
| Credo | 3 | Credo | I-Bc Q.15: 112v–113v | R 132 |
| Benedicta viscera/Ave mater gratie/Ora pro nobis Deum alleluya | 3 | Motet | GB-Ob MS. Canon. Misc. 213: 102v–103 | R 137 |
| Benedicta viscera/Ave mater gratie/Ora pro nobis Deum alleluya | 4 | Motet | GB-Ob MS. Canon. Misc. 213 | R 217 |
| Summe summy/Summa summy | 4 | Motet | I-Bc Q.15: 290v–291r | R 145 |
| Summe summy/Summa summy | 4 | Motet | I-TRbc MS 1374 [87] (Trent 87) | R 145 |
| Jusqu'au jour d'uy pour aprendre a parler | 3 | Ballade | GB-Ob MS. Canon. Misc. 213: 101 | R 125 |
| Laissiés ester vostres chans de liesse | 3 | Ballade | GB-Ob MS. Canon. Misc. 213: 100 | R 122 |
| Un petit oyselet chantant | 3 | Ballade | GB-Ob MS. Canon. Misc. 213: 89v–90 | R 119 |
| Je voel servir plus c'onques mais | 3 | Rondeau | GB-Ob MS. Canon. Misc. 213: 89 | R 118 |
No other works by Velut survive

=== Editions ===
Velut's work is included in the following collections:

- Reaney, Gilbert (1959). Early Fifteenth-century Music. Corpus mensurabilis musicae. Vol. 2 Works of Franchois Lebertoul, Guillaume Le Grant, Johannis Le Grant, Guillermi Malbecque, Johannis Reson, Gilet Velut, and others. Cambridge, Massachusetts: American Institute of Musicology. OCLC 1088534820.
