= Vasilissa ergo gaude =

Vasilissa ergo gaude ("Therefore rejoice, princess") is an isorhythmic motet by the Renaissance composer Guillaume Dufay. In terms of its subject matter, it is sometimes grouped together with Lamentatio sanctae matris ecclesiae Constantinopolitanae, Apostolus gloriosus and Balsamus et munda cera which are generically called Dufay's Byzantine motets. Its composition was occasioned by the marriage on 21 January 1421 of Cleofa Malatesta, daughter of Malatesta di Pandolfo, to Theodore II Palaiologos, son of the Byzantine emperor Manuel II and Despot of the Morea. It has been surmised that the actual motet was composed in 1420 and is perhaps the earliest example of this choral form if not the earliest work attributed to Dufay. In earlier scholarship it was assumed that the motet's first performance had taken place on May 19, 1419, during the festivities prior to the marriage

Vasilissa, ergo gaude,
Quia es digna omni laude,
Cleophe, clara gestis
A tuis de Malatestis,
In Italia principibus
Magnis et nobilibus,

Therefore rejoice, princess,
for you are worthy of all praise,
Cleofe, glorious from the deeds
of your Malatesta kin,
leading men in Italy,
great and noble,

Ex tuo viro clarior,
Quia cunctis est nobilior:
Romeorum est despotus,
Quem colit mundus totus;
In porphyro est genitus,
A deo missus celitus

More glorious from your husband,
for he is nobler than all;
he is Despot of the Rhomaioi,
he whom all the world reveres;
he was born in the purple,
sent by god from heaven

Iuvenili etate
polles et formositate
<Ingenio> multum fecunda
Et utraque lingua facunda
Ac clarior es virtutibus
Pre alliis hominibus.

In youthfull bloom
you abound and in beauty,
very fertile <in your wits>
and eloquent in both tongues,
and you are more glorious for your virtues
above other human beings.

Tenor
Concupivit rex decorem tuum
Quoniam ipse est dominus tuus

Tenor
The king hath conceived desire for thy beauty,
for he is thy Lord.

The tenor line is taken from Psalm 45:11 (44:11 in the traditional Catholic numbering), whose theme is royal marriage. The verse chosen for the motet occurs in Catholic liturgy in the Gradual of various feasts of the Virgin Mary. The motet is preserved in the contemporary music manuscript Codex Bologna, International museum and library of music, MS Q15.

In terms of structure the composition has been compared with the mature work of Johannes Ciconia, a Franco-Flemish composer also active in Italy. Of the four voices used, the two upper voices bearing the melody often imitate each other and move faster than the two lower voices. The talea is repeated only once. An additional device independent from the motet's purely isorhythmic design is the canonic introit (a short canon used as a prelude) appearing at the beginning of the composition.

Even though numerological mysticism which is often encountered in the Ars Antiqua seems to have been of minor importance in musical composition from the 14th century onwards, there have been attempts to interpret the motet's texture and design from a symbolic-mystical viewpoint. Dufay is known to have utilised similar devices such as gematria (a system of number symbolism drawn from the Pythagorean corpus) in other nuptial compositions. The tenor line singing the Cantus firmus in Vasilissa ergo gaude consists of a total of 2x49 notes plus the two closing notes, which add to a total of 100 notes. It has been suggested that this number implies the medieval symbolism for repentance which leads to absolute unity. It has further been proposed that the number 100 should be related to the total of 700 or else 7x100 notes of the remaining three voices, alluding to the sacred number 7. The sum total of notes in the motet is 800 and this has been interpreted as an allusion to the number 8. In medieval numerology, 8 signified eternity, understood in the context of Dufay's motet as eternal stability.

All these numerical symbolisms must have had a particular significance in view of the politically motivated marriage between Cleofa Malatesta and Theodore Palaiologos. The marriage was arranged as part of a series of diplomatic gestures between Cleofa's uncle Pope Martin V and the Byzantine emperor. It was hoped that it would facilitate reunification between the Roman Catholic and the Eastern Orthodox Church (cf. Council of Florence).
