= Nuper rosarum flores =

Motet by Guillaume Du Fay

Nuper rosarum flores ("Recently Flowers of Roses/The Rose Blossoms Recently"), is a motet composed by Guillaume Dufay for the 25 March 1436 consecration of the Florence Cathedral, on the occasion of the completion of the dome built under the instructions of Filippo Brunelleschi. Technically, the dome itself was not finished until five months later, at which time a separate consecration was celebrated by Benozzo Federighi, the bishop of Fiesole, substituting for the newly appointed archbishop of Florence, Cardinal Vitelleschi. The title of the piece stems from the name of the cathedral itself: Santa Maria del Fiore, or St. Mary of the Flower. The opening lines refer to Pope Eugene IV's gift (a week before the dedication) of a golden rose to decorate the high altar.

It has been argued that the motet presents 'homographic' tenors and is therefore not an isorhythmic motet as it often classified, since there are no isorhythms in its compositional proceedings. The two tenors are notated as a mensural canon employing the rhythmic ratios 6:4:2:3. These appear to be derived from the proportions of Solomon's Temple, if not those of Florence's Cathedral as sometimes assumed. Regardless, the motet is striking for its synthesis of the older isorhythmic style and the new contrapuntal style that Dufay himself would explore further in the coming decades, as would successors such as Ockeghem and Josquin des Prez. The work has "come to be treated as an icon in the history of Western musical culture".

== Structure ==
Structural plan of the motet and its tenor. Top: Pre-existing Gregorian cantus firmus; middle: Tenor in original notation, with four mensuration signs defining the diminution scheme; bottom: Total structural scheme: Through fourfold repetition of the tenor at different speeds, the motet has a structure of 4×2 parts, with length proportions of 6:4:2:3.

The two homographic tenors, which define the overall structural plan of the piece, are both based on a Gregorian cantus firmus melody taken from the introit for the consecration of churches, Terribilis est locus iste ('Awesome is this place', Genesis 28:17), a fifth apart and with different, interlocking rhythmic configurations. This double-tenor motet construction, which Dufay had used previously only in Ecclesie militantis in (probably) 1431, became a regular feature of his later motets, though Nuper rosarum flores is the sole example in which the tenor secundus draws on the same plainchant as the tenor primus.

Although the standard modern version of this chant has seventeen notes for the first four words, late medieval chant books such as the ones used in Florence in the early 15th century, have only fourteen notes. These fourteen notes are used as a canonic color in the two tenors, with an interlocking talea pattern (the rhythm patterns of the two tenor parts are different from each other) that totals 28 longa notes, of which the first 14 are rests. This interlocked pair of tenor parts is stated four times, following a diminution scheme in which the identical notation is interpreted under four different mensuration signs, first in tempus perfectum in integer valor (each longa transcribed as a 6/2 bar), then in tempus imperfectum in integer valor (transcribed as 4/2), then in tempus imperfectum diminutum (4/4), and finally in tempus perfectum diminutum (6/4), resulting in total length proportions of 6:4:2:3. This is unusual for isorhythmic motets, in which the sections normally become progressively shorter, but this proportional structure achieves its own equally effective balance. Moreover, the final isorhythmic section provides the usual drive to an accelerated finish by giving the upper voices the shortest note values in the piece. Each of the motet's four proportional sections has two sub-sections, suggesting even an eight-part structure. The first of these sub-sections includes just the two upper voices (bicinium), while the second not only is sung by all voices but also features the entry of the two instrumental tenor parts.

This large-scale plan contradicts the poetic structure of the text in the upper voices, which is divided into four strophes of seven lines, each consisting of either seven or eight syllables. The first two strophes describe the event being celebrated: "recently roses bloomed in the bitter cold of winter, adorning the Church; today it will be consecrated by Pope Eugenius with holy hands and oils". The last two strophes run together and are a prayer to the Virgin on behalf of the people of Florence.

== Controversy ==
The musicologist Charles Warren claimed that the proportional structure of the motet mimicked the proportions of Santa Maria del Fiore, the cathedral for whose consecration it was composed. However, David Fallows, Charles Turner, and others subsequently cast doubt on Warren's figures. Following these critiques, Craig Wright published a compelling refutation, demonstrating that Warren's analysis "does violence to the architecture of the church", and that the "unique ratio 6:4:2:3, which governs Dufay's motet, is... in no way immanent, or even superficially apparent, in the design of the cathedral of Florence". Instead, he concludes that Dufay's inspiration was the biblical passage 1 Kings 6:1–20, which gives the dimensions of the Temple of Solomon as 60 x 40 x 20 x 30 cubits. Marvin Trachtenberg more recently attempted to rehabilitate Warren's theory, even while conceding that "It is difficult to find fault with Wright's critique, whether regarding his refinement of Warren's musical reading, his own presentation of the textual, Solomonic-Marian syndrome, or his refutation of Warren's architectural analysis".

== Text ==
Nuper rosarum flores
Ex dono pontificis
Hieme licet horrida
Tibi, virgo coelica,
Pie et sancte deditum
Grandis templum machinae
Condecorarunt perpetim.

Hodie vicarius
Jesu Christi et Petri
Successor Eugenius
Hoc idem amplissimum
Sacris templum manibus
Sanctisque liquoribus
Consecrare dignatus est.

Igitur, alma parens
Nati tui et filia
Virgo decus virginum,
Tuus te Florentiae
Devotus orat populus,
Ut qui mente et corpore
Mundo quicquam exorarit

Oratione tua
Cruciatus et meritis
Tui secundum carnem
Nati Domini sui
Grata beneficia
Veniamque reatum
Accipere mereatur.
Amen.

Cantus firmus:
Terribilis est locus iste

Recently roses (came) as a gift from the Pope,
despite the cruel winter, to you, heavenly Virgin,
to whom a temple of magnificent design
is dedicated dutifully and through sacred rites.
Together may they be perpetual ornaments.

Today the Vicar of Jesus Christ
and Peter’s successor, Eugenius,
has the honour to consecrate
this same most spacious sacred temple
with his hands and with holy water.

Therefore, gracious mother and daughter of your own Son,
virgin, ornament of virgins,
the people of your city of Florence devoutly pray
that whoever entreats you with a pure mind and body may,

through your prayer, your anguish and merits,
be found worthy to receive of the Lord,
born of you as all flesh is,
the benefits of grace and the remission of sins.

Amen.

Cantus firmus:
Awe-inspiring is this place

== Sources ==
- Anon. (n.d.). "Nuper rosarum flores". Choral Public Domain Library.
- Bent, Margaret. 2008. "What is Isorhythm?" In Quomodo cantabimus canticum? Studies in Honor of Edward H. Roesner edited by David Butler Cannata, Gabriela Ilnitchi Currie, Rena Charnin Mueller, and John Luis Nadas, 121–143. Middleton: The American Institute of Musicology.
- Carpenter, Patricia. 1973. "Tonal Coherence in a Motet of Dufay". Journal of Music Theory 17:2–65.
- Fallows, David. 1987. Dufay, revised edition. The Master Musicians Series. London and Melbourne: J. M. Dent. ISBN 0-460-02493-0
- Trachtenberg, Marvin. 2001. "Architecture and Music Reunited: A New Reading of Dufay's Nuper rosarum flores and the Cathedral of Florence". Renaissance Quarterly 54, no. 3 (Fall): 740–775.
- Turner, Charles. 1991. "Proportion and Form in the Continental Isorhythmic Motet c. 1385–1450". Music Analysis 10, nos. 1–2 (March–July): 89–124.
- Warren, Charles. 1973. "Brunelleschi's Dome and Dufay's Motet". The Musical Quarterly 59:92–105.
- Wright, Craig (1994). "Dufay's "Nuper rosarum flores", King Solomon's Temple, and the Veneration of the Virgin". Journal of the American Musicological Society. 47 (3): 395–427, 429–441. doi:10.2307/3128798. JSTOR 3128798.
