= Cleofa Malatesta =

Italian noblewoman

- Born: fl. 1420
- Died: 1433
- Spouse: Theodore II Palaiologos
- Issue: Helena Palaiologina
- House: Malatesta
- Father: Malatesta IV Malatesta
- Mother: Elisabetta da Varano

Cleofa Malatesta da Pesaro (also Cleofe, Cleopa or Cleopha) (fl. 1420 – died 1433) was an Italian noblewoman and the wife of Theodore II Palaiologos, Despot of the Morea, brother of Constantine XI, the last Byzantine emperor. She was a daughter of Malatesta dei Sonetti, Count of Pesaro, and Elisabetta da Varano. She married Theodore Palaiologos in Mystras on January 21, 1421, or sometime in 1422 in an arranged marriage that was part of an initiative of her uncle, Pope Martin V, to join Western (Roman Catholic) with Orthodox nobility, who in this way hoped to gain political alliances against the Ottoman Turks.

== Marriage ==
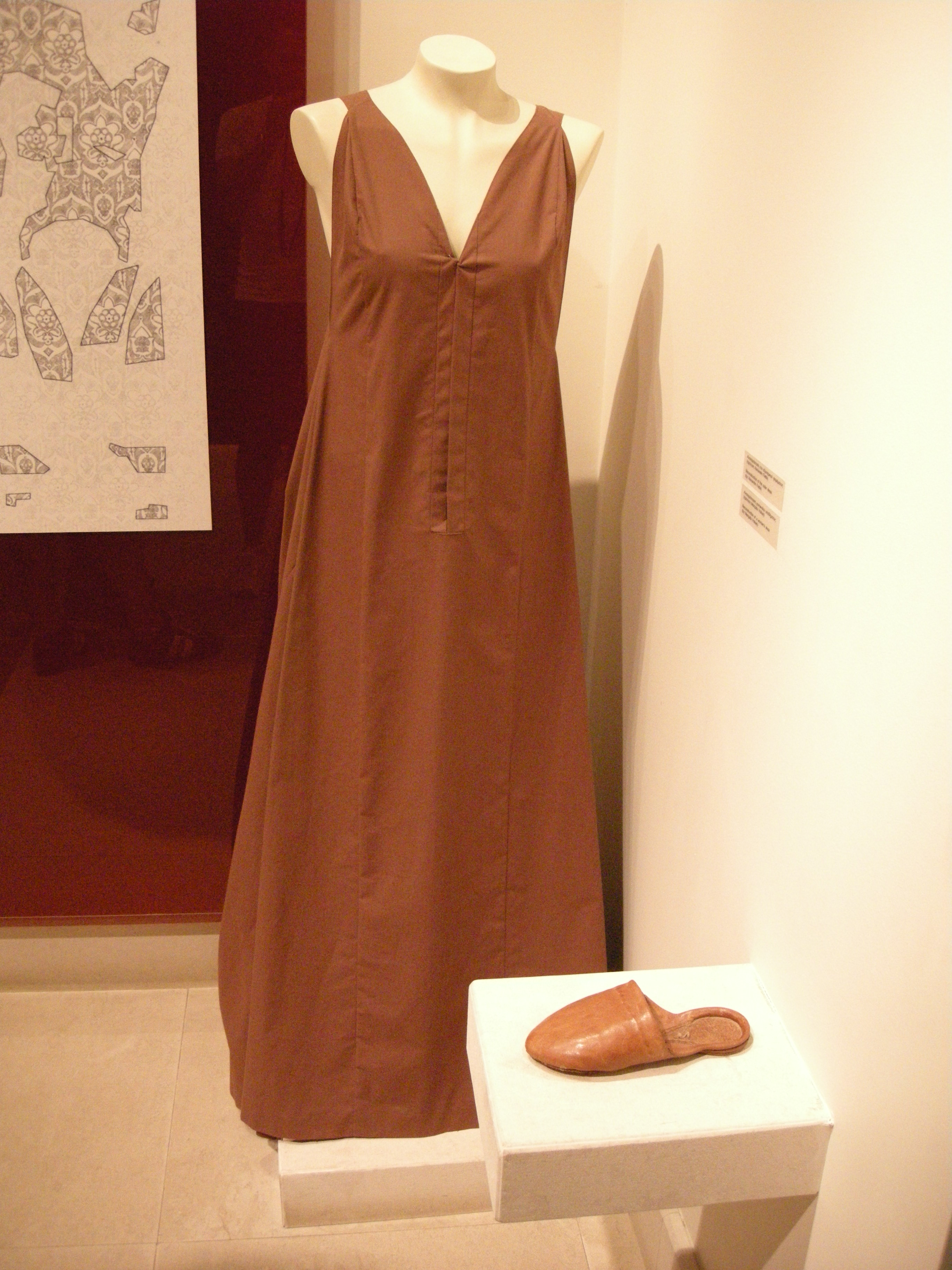
Reconstruction of the dress and shoes of the "Mystras mummy", possibly Cleofe Malatesta's

On 20 August 1420, Cleofa left Italy embarking from Fano near Pesaro for Constantinople. She was accompanied by another young bride, Sophia of Montferrat, who was to marry John VIII Palaiologos, Theodore's brother. For the occasion of Cleofa's marriage, a celebratory motet has been preserved written by the famous Renaissance composer Guillaume Dufay, Vasilissa ergo gaude ("So rejoice, Queen", using the Greek title for "queen", βασίλισσα). The text of the motet describes her as young, beautiful and a competent speaker of both Italian and Greek. Yet another piece of music praising Cleofa, the ballata Tra quante regione was composed in the 1420s by Hugo de Lantins to celebrate her marriage to the Byzantine prince.

Cleofa and Theodoros lived in Mystras in the Peloponnese, one of the last strongholds of Byzantine culture. After some difficult years of marriage, she finally gave in to local pressures and allowed it to be believed that she had converted to the Eastern rite. She had one daughter, Helena Palaiologina, who later married King John II of Cyprus.

Cleofa died in 1433. Her death was commemorated with speeches by Bessarion, later to become a cardinal in Italy, and in a eulogy written by the eminent Greek neoplatonic philosopher Gemistus Pletho.

== Possible grave ==
In the 20th century, remains of the body of a woman clothed in western dress were found in a 15th-century grave in the church of Ag. Sophia of Mystras. It has been speculated that this grave may have been Cleofa's.

== Sources ==
- Primary sources
- Diana G. Wright: "Pavane for a dead princess"
