= Hugo de Lantins =

Franco-Flemish composer

Hugo de Lantins (fl. 1420–1430) was a Franco-Flemish composer of the late Medieval era and early Renaissance. He was active in Italy, especially Venice, and wrote both sacred and secular music; he may have been a relative of Arnold de Lantins, another composer active at the same time in the same area.

Little is known about his life, except that he was probably in Venice during the 1420s, for he wrote ceremonial music for the Doge Francesco Foscari; his music appears in several collections from that city. Evidently he wrote music for the wedding of Cleofe Malatesta and Theodore Palaiologos, Prince of Sparta, in 1421, since precise topical details occur in the text to the music. He almost certainly was known to Dufay, since both composers wrote music for some of the same events, and Dufay mentioned him in the text to one of the compositions he wrote during his stay in Rimini with the Malatesta family (1420–1424).

Hugo's music is more forward looking than that of Arnold, making use of imitation, which was to become the prevailing musical device for the next hundred years and more; indeed, imitation is more prevalent in the music of Lantins than in the music of any other composer of the early 15th century. Most of Hugo's music is for three voices, though occasionally he added a fourth.

Several sections of masses have survived, but none complete, as well as five motets, one of which is isorhythmic. In the secular music category he wrote many rondeaux, all in French, as well as some ballate in Italian (almost certainly for the royal wedding of the Malatesta family).

== Media ==
- Jo sum tuo servo

== References and further reading ==
- Pièces polyphoniques profanes de provenance liégeoise (XVe siècle), ed. C. van den Borren. Bruxelles, 1950 (edn. of all secular compositions)
- Schoop, Hans (1980). "Lantins, de: (5) Hugo de Lantins". In Sadie, Stanley (ed.). The New Grove Dictionary of Music and Musicians. Vol. x (1st ed.). London: Macmillan. pp. 457–458.
- Allsen, J. Michael. L. Macy (ed.). Lantins, de: (5) Hugo de Lantins. Grove Music Online. (subscription required)
- Gustave Reese, Music in the Renaissance. New York, W.W. Norton & Co., 1954. ISBN 0-393-09530-4
