= Old Cambrai Cathedral =

Coordinates: 50.17606°N 3.22968°E

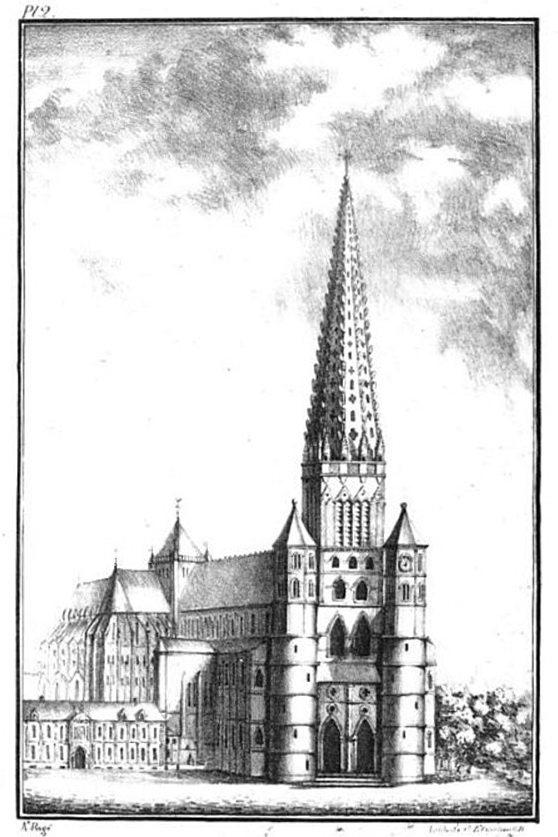
Church façade

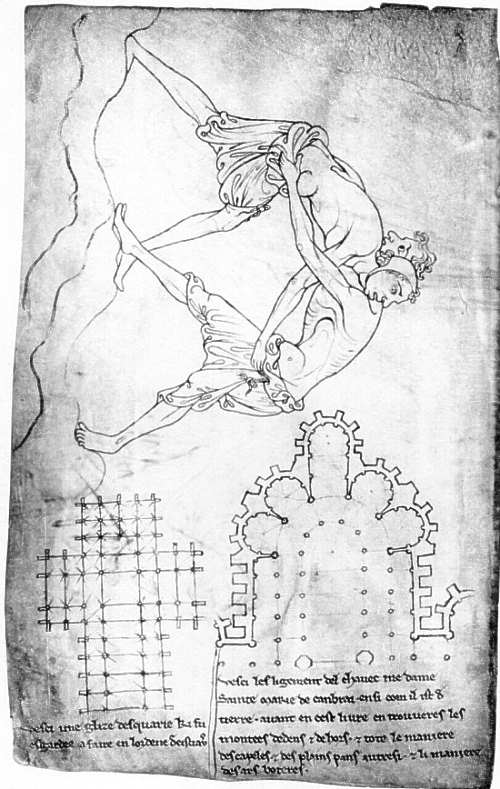
Sketches in Villard de Honnecourt's portfolio: the bottom-right sketch is labelled "Here is the plan of the chevet of Notre Dame Sainte Marie de Cambrai as it was built"

Old Cambrai Cathedral was the Gothic cathedral of the diocese of Cambrai in France, sited on what is now Place Fénelon in Cambrai but now entirely lost. Recorded as one of the largest and finest architectural monuments in northern France, it was replaced by the current Cambrai Cathedral.

== History ==
The foundations of the old cathedral dated back to the fourth century. The church was rebuilt by Saint Vaast in the sixth century.

The first plans for a new cathedral were made after a fire in 1148 destroyed the city's 11th century cathedral (rebuilt by bishops Gerard of Florennes and Gerard of Lessines). By the end of the twelfth century, a chapel dedicated to Saint Gangulph was finished and a bronze angel crowned the octagonal stone spire. The choir was completed around 1251 (when the canons took possession of it). There was a clock in the north transept above the Chapel of Notre-Dame-de-Pitié. The cathedral as a whole was consecrated in 1472.

Known as 'the wonder of the low countries', it measured 131 meters in length and 72 meters wide and its highest spire was 114 meters above ground level. Nineteenth century excavations to renew a road along Place Fénelon rediscovered part of its choir. That choir is sometimes attributed to Villard de Honnecourt, but the sketch of it in his portfolio is inexact and possibly by another architect. Another excavation in 1954, in advance of building work, uncovered the foundations of the south transept and another in the 2000s for the construction of the Lycée Fénelon's gymnasium revealed some buildings from the adjoining archbishop's palace, a golden key and other finds.

The cathedral, “exceeded all others in Christendom with its fine singing, its bright lighting and its sweet bells”, but most significantly, resided leading musicians and composers of the time The old cathedral was host to several notable French and Flemish composers who served as maître de chapelle including Guillaume Dufay, Robert de Févin, Johannes Lupi, and Jean de Bonmarché. Nicolas Malin and Richard Loqueville taught Dufay there; Gilet Velut was likely petit vicaire in 1409. In 1428 Philippe de Luxembourg claimed that the cathedral was the finest in all of Christianity, for the fineness of its singing, its light, and the sweetness of its bells.

In 1791, during the French Revolution, the cathedral was used for worship under the "culte constitutionnel", but only a year later it was damaged. In 1793 it was converted into a granary, and on 6 June 1796 sold to a certain Blanquart, a merchant from Saint-Quentin, who demolished it in order to sell off the stone. Its spire survived into the early years of the First French Empire, when attempts were made to save it as a memorial to Fénelon, but the project was abandoned after being judged too costly, and the spire left to be blown down in a storm in 1809.

The building is known only through a few surviving documents - two high-precision drawings by Louis XIV's military painter Van der Meulen, statements made on the feasibility of the Fénelon spire project, a watercolour painted by an English soldier on the fall of the First Empire, and two photographs of the royal engineers' 1695 'plan-relief' of the town (the plan-relief itself was taken by the Germans during the Second World War occupation and was destroyed in the Battle of Berlin in 1945).

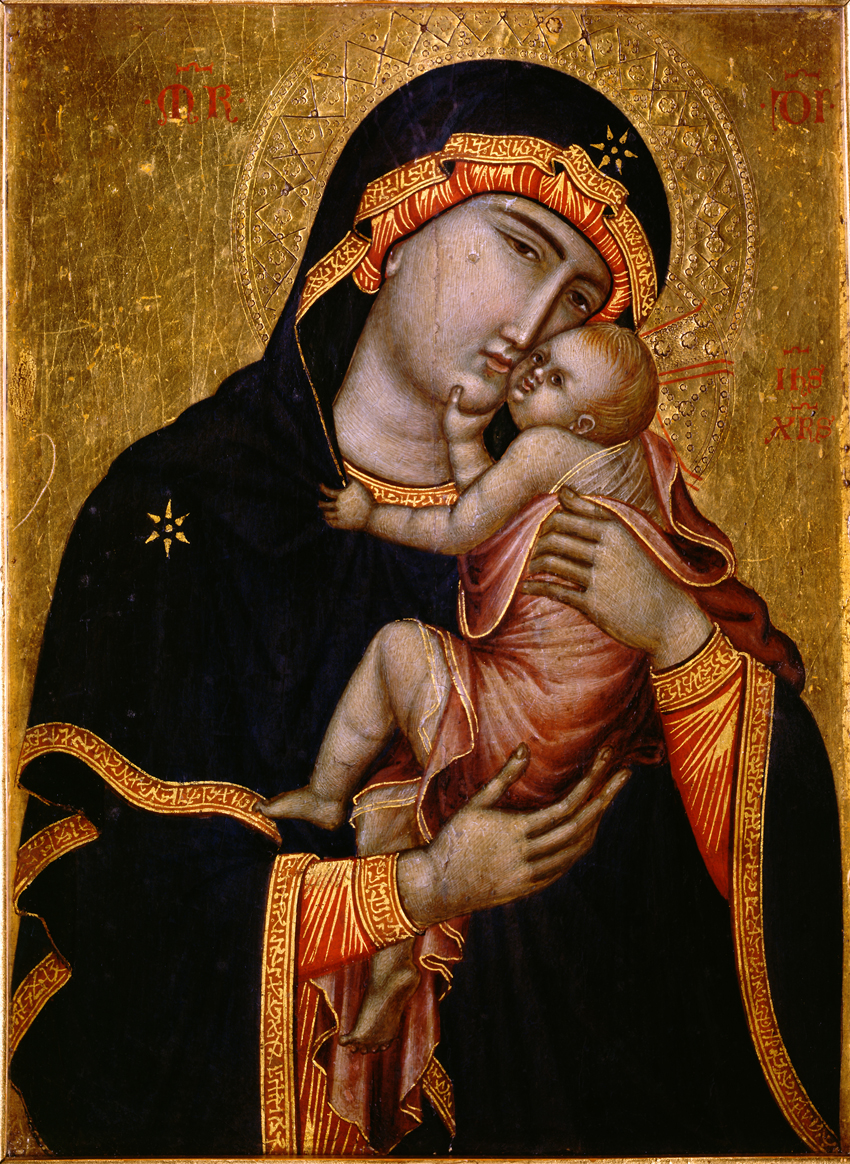
Notre-Dame de Grâce, Cambrai Cathedral

=== Notre-Dame de Grâce ===
In 1450, a painting of the Madonna and child was presented to the cathedral by Fursy de Bruille, a cathedral canon. It was installed with great ceremony in the Chapel of the Holy Trinity and became the object of fervent pilgrimage, reflecting a contemporary appetite for new types of devotional imagery. A confraternity was established in 1453 for the "care and veneration" of the relic, which from 1455 was carried in procession through the town on the Feast of the Assumption (August 15). In Cambrai, the work attracted thousands of pilgrims, including Philip the Good (1457), Charles the Bold (1460), and Louis XI of France. The painting was subsequently transferred to the present cathedral.

== Gallery ==
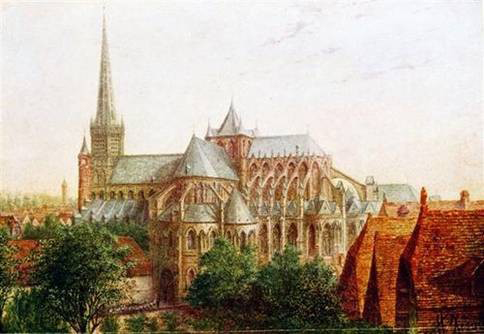
A painting of the old cathedral.

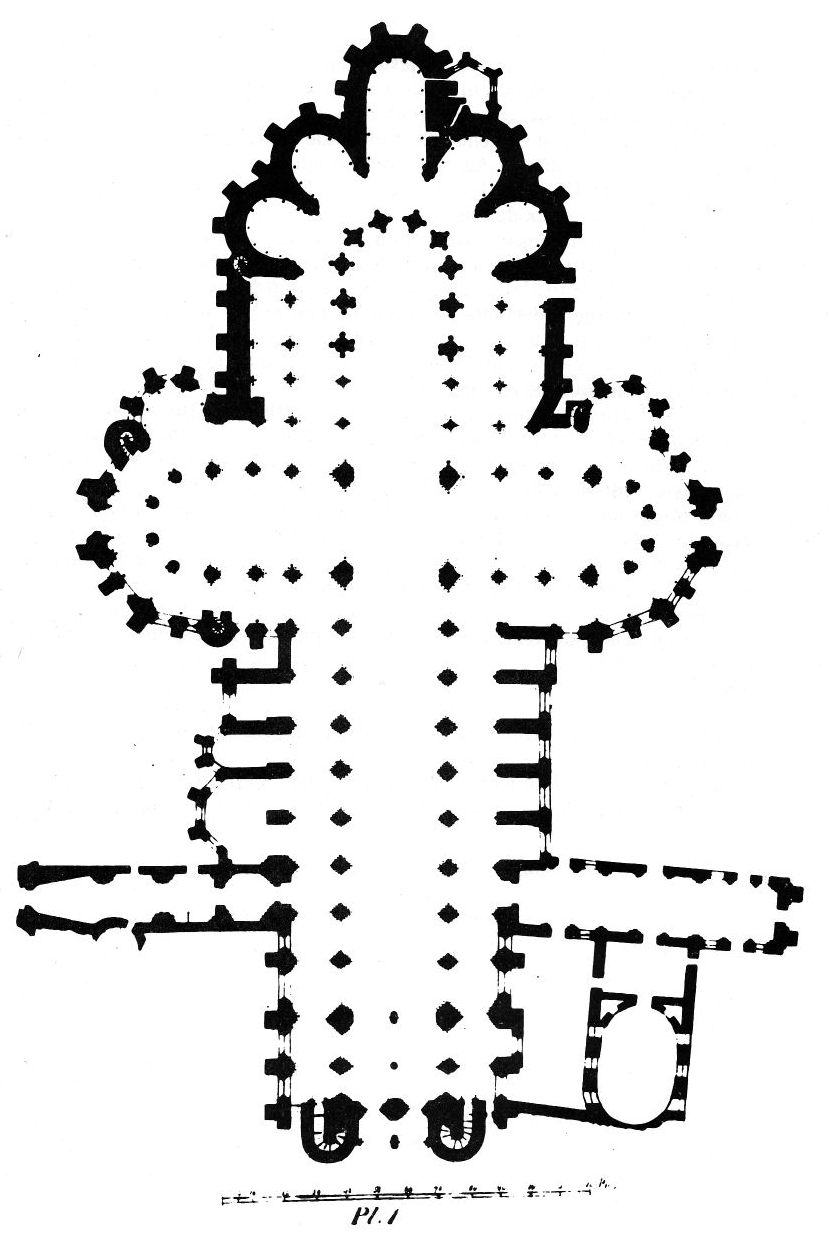
Floor plan of the old cathedral.

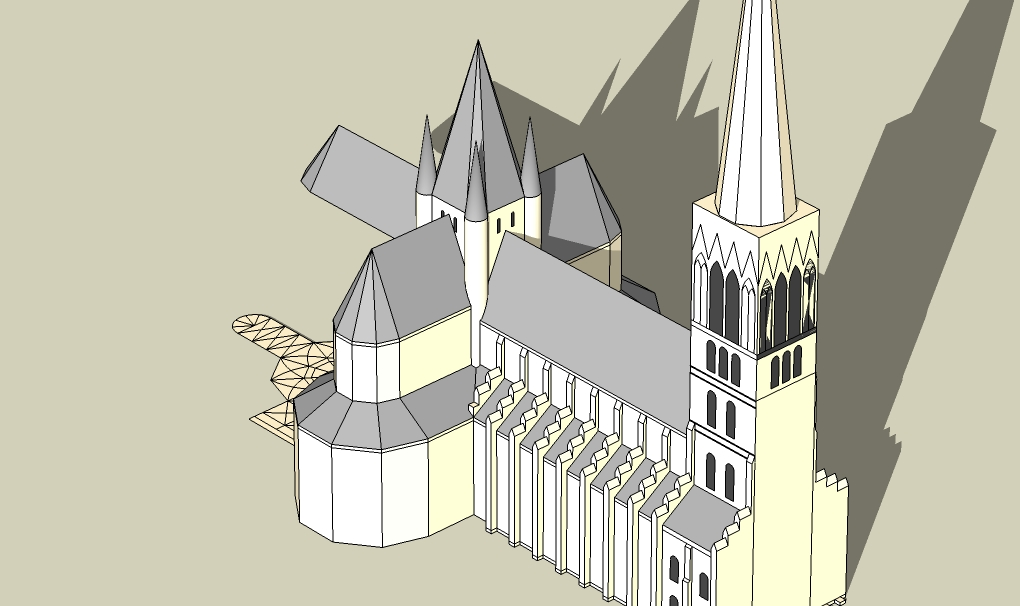
Incomplete 3D model of the old cathedral.

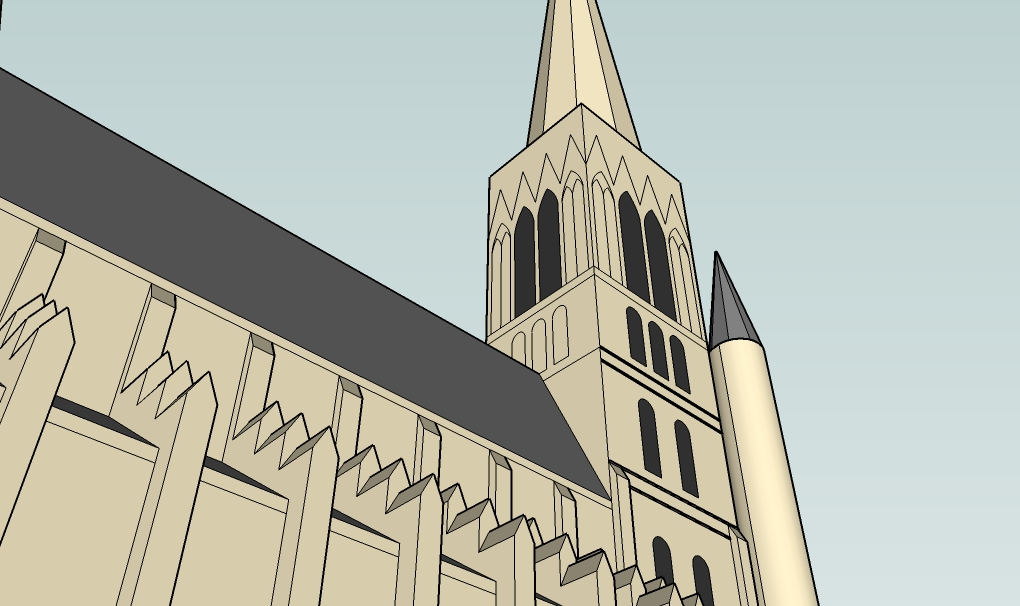
Incomplete 3D model of the old cathedral.

== Sources ==
- Trénard, Louis (ed), 1982: Histoire de Cambrai. Presses Universitaires de Lille
