= Frank D'Accone =

American musicologist (1931–2022)

Frank Anthony D'Accone
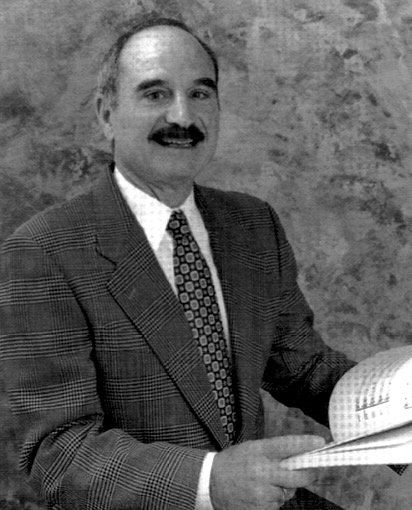
- Born: June 13, 1931; Somerville, Massachusetts
- Died: June 26, 2022 (aged 91); Laguna Beach, California

Academic background
- Education: Harvard University
- Thesis: A documentary history of music at the Florentine Cathedral and Baptistry during the fifteenth century (1960)

Academic work
- Discipline: Musicology

Frank Anthony D'Accone (June 13, 1931 – June 26, 2022) was an American musicologist. He was the author of documentary studies of the musicians and institutions that produced the music of the Florentine and Siennese Renaissance. His many modern editions of the music of this culture made available to present-day performers and scholars for the first time in several centuries a wide-ranging picture of the musical life in Tuscany during the Renaissance. Musicologist Lewis Lockwood stated that his body of work "substantially extends current knowledge of the music history of the Italian Renaissance."

== Early life and education ==
Frank D'Accone was born in Somerville, Massachusetts on June 13, 1931. He received BMus and MMus degrees from Boston University, where his teachers included Karl Geiringer and Gardner Read. At Harvard University he studied with Nino Pirrotta, A. Tillman Merritt, Randall Thompson and Walter Piston, receiving his MA in 1955 and PhD in 1960. During two years of archival work in Florence as John Knowles Paine Travelling Fellow in Music, he gathered material for his dissertation: “A Documentary History of Music in the Florentine Cathedral and Baptistry during the 15th Century”.

== Career ==
D'Accone was Assistant and Associate Professor at State University of New York (SUNY), Buffalo (1960–1968), Visiting Professor at the University of California, Los Angeles (UCLA) (1966–67) and Yale University (1972–73). He was Professor of Music and Musicology at UCLA from 1968 until retirement in 1994. D’Accone’s research focused on music of Florence and Siena from the 14th to the 17th centuries. His 12-volume Music of the Florentine Renaissance is a major source for scholarship on sacred and secular music of the period. His writing for scholarly journals covered a wide variety of topics ranging from individual composers (i.e., Gagliamo, Isaac, Pisano) to the musical activity in specific institutions (i.e., Cathedral of Santa Maria del Fiore). His writings presented a broad view of musical culture in northern Italy during the Renaissance. With Howard Mayer Brown and Jesse A. Owens he edited the series Renaissance Music in Facsimile, and with Gilbert Reaney the journal Musica Disciplina. He was also general editor of the Corpus mensurabilis musicae.

== Death ==
D'Accone died in Laguna Beach, California on June 26, 2022, at the age of 91.

== Awards ==
D'Accone received grants and awards from the Guggenheim Foundation, the American Academy in Rome, the American Council of Learned Societies, the University of California, the Gladys Krieble Delmas Foundation and the Fulbright Commission. D'Accone is a member of the American Academy of Arts and Sciences and Cavaliere della Repubblica Italiana. In 1997 he was awarded the Italian Rotary Clubs' Galileo International Prize at the University of Pisa.

== Selected bibliography ==
=== As author ===
“A Documentary History of Music at the Florentine Cathedral and Baptistry in the Fifteenth Century” (diss., Harvard U., 1960).

“The Singers of San Giovanni in Florence during the 16th Century”, Journal of the American Musicological Society, xiv (1961), 307-58; reprinted in The Garland Library of the History of Music, ed. E. Rosand, iii/1, New York (1985), 141–92; reprinted in Music in Renaissance Florence: Studies and Documents, Aldershot (2006).

“Bernardo Pisano: An Introduction to His Life and Works”, Musica Disciplina, xvii (1963), 115–35.

“Heinrich Isaac in Florence: New and Unpublished Documents, The Musical Quarterly, xlix (1963), 464–483; reprinted in Music in Renaissance Florence: Studies and Documents, Aldershot (2006).

“Antonio Squarcialupi alla luce di documenti inediti”, Chigiana 23, new series 3 (1966), 3–24.

“The Intavolatura di M. Alammano Aiolli: A Newly Discovered Source of Florentine Renaissance Keyboard Music”, Musica Disciplina, xx (1966), 151–174.

“Alessandro Coppini and Bartolomeo degli Organi: Two Florentine Composers of the Renaissance”, Analecta musicologica, iv (1967), 38–76; reprinted in Music in Renaissance Florence: Studies and Documents, Aldershot (2006).

“Bernardo Pisano and the Early Madrigal”, International Musicological Society: Congress Report, x, Ljubljana (1967), Kassel (1970), 96–107.

“Giovanni Mazzuoli, a Late Representative of the Florentine Ars Nova”, L’Ars Nova italiana del Trecento, Certaldo (1968), 22–38.

“Le compagnie dei laudesi in Firenze durante l’Ars Nova”, L’Ars Nova Italiana del Trecento, iii, Certaldo (1970), 253–280.

”Some Neglected Composers in the Florentine Chapels, ca. 1475–1525”, Viator: Medieval and Renaissance Studies, i, (1970), 263–288; reprinted in Music in Renaissance Florence: Studies and Documents, Aldershot (2006).

“The Musical Chapels at the Florentine Cathedral and Baptistry during the First Half of the 16th Century”, Journal of the American Musicological Society, xxiv (1971), 1–50; reprinted in Music and Musicians in 16th-Century Florence, Aldershot (2007).

“Transitional Text Forms and Settings in an Early 16th-Century Florentine Manuscript”, Words and Music: The Scholar’s View, Cambridge (1972), 29–58.

“Music and Musicians at Santa Maria del Fiore in the Early Quattrocento”, Scritti in onore di Luigi Ronga, Milan (1973), 99–126; reprinted in Music in Renaissance Florence: Studies and Documents, Aldershot (2006).

“Music and Musicians at the Florentine Monastery of Santa Trinita, 1360–1363”, Memorie e contributi alla musica dal medioevo all’età moderna offerti a Federico Ghisi nel settantesimo compleanno (1901–1971), Bologna (1973), 131–151; reprinted in Music in Renaissance Florence: Studies and Documents, Aldershot (2006).

“Matteo Rompellini and His Petrarchan Canzoni Cycles”, Musica Disciplina, xxvii (1973), 65–106.

“Alcune note sulle Compagnie fiorentine dei Laudesi durante il Quattrocento”, Rivista Italiana di Musicologia, x (1975), 86–114.

“The Performance of Sacred Music in Italy during Josquin’s Time, ca 1475–1525”, Josquin Des Prez, Proceedings of the International Josquin Festival-Conference, 1971, London (1976), 601–618.

“The Florentine Fra Mauros: A Dynasty of Musical Friars”, Musica Disciplina xxxiii (1979), 77–137; reprinted in Music and Musicians in 16th-Century Florence, Aldershot (2007).

“Repertory and Performance Practice in Santa Maria Novella at the Turn of the 17th Century”, A Festschrift for Albert Seay, Colorado Springs (1982), 514–537; reprinted in Music and Musicians in 16th-Century Florence, Aldershot (2007): 71–136.

“A Late 15th-Century Sienese Repertory, MS K. 1. 2 of the Biblioteca Comunale, Siena”, Musica Disciplina, xxxvii (1983), 121–170.

“Singolarità di alcuni aspetti della musica sacra fiorentina del Cinquecento”, Firenze e la Toscana dei Medici nell’Europa del ‘500, Vol. II, Musica e spettacolo: Scienze dell’uomo e della natura. Florence (1983), 513–537; reprinted in Music and Musicians in 16th-Century Florence, Aldershot (2007).

“Una nuova fonte dell’Ars Nova italiano: Il codice di San Lorenzo, 2211”, Studi Musicali xiii (1984), 3–31; reprinted in Music in Renaissance Florence: Studies and Documents, Aldershot (2006).

The History of a Baroque Opera: Alessandro Scarlatti’s ‘Gli equivoci nel sembiante’, New York (1985).

“Updating the Style: Francesco Corteccia’s Revisions in His Responsories for Holy Week”, Music and Context: Essays for John M. Ward, Cambridge, Mass, (1985), 32–53; reprinted in Music and Musicians in 16th-Century Florence, Aldershot (2007).

“Marco da Gagliamo and the Florentine Tradition for Holy Week Music”, La musique et le rite sacre et profane, II. Actes du XIIIe Congrès de la Société Internationale de Musicologie, Strasbourg (1986), 323–363; reprinted in Music and Musicians in 16th-Century Florence, Aldershot (2007).

“Music at the Sienese Cathedral in the Later 16th Century”, Trasmissione e recezione delle forme di cultura musicale, Bologna (1987), Turin (1990), 729–736.

“The Sources of Luca Bati’s Music at the Opera di Santa Maria del Fiore”, Altro Polo: Essays on Italian Music in the Cinquecento, Sydney (1990), 159–177.

“The Sienese Rhymed Office for the Feast of Sant’Ansano”, L’Ars Nova Italiana del Trecento, Certaldo (1992), 21–40.

“Lorenzo il Magnifico e la musica”, La musica a Firenze al tempo di Lorenzo il Magnifico, Florence (1993), 219–248.

"La musica a Siena and Trecento, Quattrocento e Cinquecento”, Umanesimo a Siena: Letteratura, Arti Figurative, Musica, Siena (1994), 455–480.

“Lorenzo the Magnificent and Music” Lorenzo di Magnifico e il suo mondo, Florence (1994), 259–290; reprinted in Music in Renaissance Florence: Studies and Documents, Aldershot (2006).

“Instrumental Resonances in a Sienese Vocal Print of 1515”, Le Concert des voix et des instruments à la Renaissance, Paris (1995), 333–359.

The Civic Music: Music and Musicians in Siena During the Middle Ages and the Renaissance, Chicago, 1996.

“Ancora su l’opera prima di Scarlatti e la Regina”, Cristina de Svezia e la Musica, Rome (1998), 72–97.

“Confronting a Problem of Attribution, ossia. Which of the Two is Scarlatti’s First Opera?” Journal of Musicology, xvii (1999), 168–192.

“Sacre Music in Florence during Savonarola’s Time,” Una città e il suo profeta, Firenze di fronte al Savonarola, Florence (1998), 311–354; reprinted in Music in Renaissance Florence: Studies and Documents, Aldershot (2006).

“Corteccia’s motets for the Medici marriages of 1558”, Words on Music: Essays in Honor of Andrew Porter, New York (2003).

“Francesco Corteccia’s Peace Motet”, Et facciam dolçi canti: Studi in onore di Agostino Ziino, i, Lucca (2003), 407–438.

“Cardinal Chigi and Music Redux”, Music Observed: Studies in Memory of William C. Holmes, Warren, Michigan (2004), 65–100.

“Notes on the Italianization of Siena’s musical chapel in the late Cinquecento”, Cappelle musicali fra corte, Stato e Chiesa nell’italia del Rinascimento : atti del convegno internazionale, Florence (2007).

“Music Education in Siena in the 16th Century”, L’ultimo secolo della Repubblica di Siena: Atti del Convegno Internazionale, Siena (2008), 479–92.

“Francesco Corteccia’s Hymn for St. John’s Day in the Florentine Liturgy, ca. 1544–1737”, Uno gentile et subtile ingenio: Studies in Renaissance Music in Honour of Bonnie Blackburn, Turnhout (2009), 101–108.

“Solving the Mystery of Francesco Corteccia’s ‘Book of Counterpoints’”, Sleuthing the Muse: Essays in Honor of William F. Prizer. Hillsdale (2009)

=== As editor ===
Music of the Florentine Renaissance (Corpus Musicae Mensurabilis 32), Volumes 1–13, (1966–2009).

Scarlatti, Gli equivoci vel sembiante, (The Operas of Alessandro Scarlatti 7), Cambridge (1982).

Musica Disciplina, A Yearbook of Music, 1990–2001.

Fra Mauro de Firenze utriusque muscies epitome (dell’una e l’altra musica), Corpus Scriptorum de Musica, xxxii (1984).

Renaissance Music in Facsimile, Vols. 3, 4, 5, 7A, 7B, 16, 17, 18, 1986–1988.

Corpus Mensurabilis Musicae (American Institute of Musicology), 1986–2001

=== Reference works ===
Paula Morgan, “D’Accone, Frank A.”, The New Grove Dictionary of American Music, Vol. 1, New York: Grove Dictionaries of Music, (1986): 560.

Irene Alm, Alyson McLamore, Colleen Reardon, eds., Musica franca: Essays in Honor of Frank A. D’Accone, Stuyvesant, NY (1996).

Lewis Lockwood, “Introduction”, Musica franca: Essays in Honor of Frank A. D'Accone. Pendragon Press, Stuyvesant, NY (1996): 1–2.

Paula Morgan, “D’Accone, Frank A.” The New Grove Dictionary of Music and Musicians, second edition, Vol. 6, New York: Grove, (2001): 829–830.

Frank A. D’Accone. “D’Accone, Frank A.” Die Musik in Geschicte und Gegenwart, Personenteil, vol. 5, Kassel: Barenreiter (2001): 240–241.

Who’s Who in America, New Providence, NJ (2000) I, 1070.

International Who’s Who of Classical Music 2006, xxii, Europa Publications (2006): 171.
