= Ursula Günther =

German musicologist (1927–2006)

- Born: Ursula Rösse; 15 June 1927; Hamburg, Germany
- Died: 21 November 2006 (aged 79); Ahrensburg, Germany
- Known for: Coining the term ars subtilior
- Honours: Chevalier des Palmes académiques (1982), honorary professor, Corresponding Member of the American Musicological Society

Academic background
- Education: University of Hamburg
- Academic advisor: Heinrich Besseler

Academic work
- Discipline: Musicologist
- Sub-discipline: Medieval music
- Notable works: Editorial board of the Journal of Musicology, General Editor of Musicological Studies and Documents

Ursula Günther (15 June 1927 – 20 or 21 November 2006) was a German musicologist specializing in the fourteenth and early fifteenth centuries and the music of Giuseppe Verdi. She coined the term ars subtilior, to categorize the rhythmically complex music that followed ars nova.

== Life ==
Ursula Günther was born Ursula Rösse in Hamburg. After studying piano with D. Kraus and H. E. Riebensahm and music theory with H. Stahmer in Hamburg, she graduated with a music teacher's degree in 1947. From 1948 she studied music with Heinrich Husmann at the University of Hamburg along with other subjects such as art history, German and Romance Literature, philosophy, psychology, and phonetics. In 1957 at Hamburg she wrote a thesis under the tutelage of Heinrich Besseler on the change in style of the French song in the second half of the fourteenth century which built on the research of Friedrich Ludwig.

With financial support from her husband, encouragement from Gilbert Reaney, Armen Carapetyan, and, from 1962, funds from the German Research Foundation, she took the position as a teacher in Ahrensburg in order to finish her habilitation which had been rejected by some German professors. Encouraged also by Oliver Strunk and Nanie Bridgeman, she joined in 1969 the Centre National de la Recherche Scientifique in Paris as attaché de recherche (researcher) and was promoted as chargé de recherche (research fellow) with Jacques Chailley in 1965, where she taught as a lecturer at the Sorbonne from 1969 to 1971 to prepare her "Doctorat d' état" on Verdi's French years.

After obtaining her habilitation at the University of Göttingen in 1972 with an edition of motets of the fourteenth century (published in 1965 by A. Carapetayan in CMM 39), she taught one semester as a lecturer in Göttingen before returning to Paris to resume her work as "chargé de recherche". In the summer of 1973 she was a visiting professor at New York University and was subsequently invited to give lectures by numerous American universities such as Princeton, Harvard, Brandeis, Philadelphia, Maryland, Bloomington, UC Davis, and Los Angeles. She was later appointed as chargé de cours (lecturer) by the Free University in Brussels to teach the history of music notation. In 1973, she turned down an offer from Brandeis University and in 1975 took a job as a lecturer at the University of Göttingen. While she continued to teach in Brussels, in 1977 was appointed professor at the University of Göttingen and finally gave up her post at the CNRS. The new University Act of the State of Lower Saxony enabled her to be director of Musicology in Göttingen for some time. In 1977, she held summer courses on Verdi research at Northwestern University at Evanston, Illinois. In 1992, she retired and lived in Ahrensburg near Hamburg, where she died either on 20 November or 21 November 2006.

== Influence ==
Ursula Günther coined the term ars subtilior which classified the music of the late fourteenth century to describe the subtle rhythm reflected in the music of the time. Another field of research was the work of Giuseppe Verdi. She published his opera Don Carlos in an issue with the five-act French original version and also with the four-act Italian version. She published widely, becoming one of the most influential musicologists of the twentieth century.

== Writings ==
=== Fourteenth-century music ===
- "Der musikalische Stilwandel der französischen Liedkunst in der zweiten Hälfte des 14. Jahrhunderts: dargestellt an Virelais, Balladen und Rondeaux von Machaut sowie datierbaren Kantilenensätzen seiner Zeitgenossen und direkten Nachfolger". PhD Diss. Hamburg: University of Hamburg, 1957. 286 pages. University document: Hamburg, defended in the Faculty of Philosophy on 7 December 1957 (not available for circulation).
- Ursula Günther (ed.): Zehn datierbare Kompositionen der Ars nova. Schriftenreihe des Musikwissenschaftlichen Instituts der Universität Hamburg 2. Hamburg: Musikwissenschaftliches Institut der Universität Hamburg, 1959.
- Ursula Günther: "Das Ende der Ars Nova". Die Musikforschung 16 (1963), pp. 105–120.
- Ursula Günther: "Zur Biographie einiger Komponisten der Ars Subtilior". Archiv für Musikwissenschaft 21 (1964), p. 172–99.
- Ursula Günther (ed.): The Motets of the Manuscripts Chantilly, Musée Condé, 564 (olim 1047) and Modena, Biblioteca Estense, α M. 5,24 (olim lat. 568). Corpus Mensurabilis Musicae 39. [n.p.]: American Institute of Musicology, 1965.
- Ursula Günther und Ludwig Finscher (eds.): "Aspects of Music in Church, Court, and Town from the 13th to the 15th Century". Musica Disciplina 38 (1984) [includes her essay "Unusual Phenomena in the Transmission of Late 14th Century Polyphonic Music", p. 87–118].
- Ursula Günther und Ludwig Fischer (eds.): "1380-1420: An International Style?". Musica Disciplina 41 (1987) [includes an article with John Nádas und John Stinson, "Magister Dominus Paulus Abbas de Florentia: New Documentary Evidence", pp. 203-246]
- Ursula Günther and Ludwig Fischer (eds.): Musik und Text in der Mehrstimmigkeit des 14. und 15. Jahrhunderts. Kassel: Bärenreiter, 1984. ISBN 3-7618-0744-9.
- Ursula Günther: "Die Ars subtilior". Hamburger Jahrbuch für Musikwissenschaft 11 (1991), pp. 277–288.
- The Cypriot-French Repertory of the Manuscript Torino J.II.9: Report of the International Musicological Congress, Paphos, 20–25 March 1992, by Ludwig Finscher and Societa italiana di musicologia and Ursula Gunther and Associazione piemontese per la ricerca delle fonti musicali. [Rome]: American Institute of Musicology, ISBN 3-7751-2501-9.
- Ludwig Finscher, Ursula Günther, and Jeffrey J. Dean. Modality in the Music of the Fourteenth and Fifteenth Centuries: Modalität in der Musik des 14. und 15. Jahrhunderts. Musicological Studies and Documents 49. [Rome]: American Institute of Musicology, Hänssler-Verlag, 1996. ISBN 3-7751-2423-3.
- Ursula Günther: "Polymetric Rondeaux from Machaut to Dufay: Some Style-Analytical Observations". In Studies in Musical Sources and Style (Festschrift Jan La Rue), pp. 75–108. Madison: 1990.
- Ursula Günther: "Bemerkungen zur Motette des frühen und mittleren Trecento". In Die Motette pp. 29–39. Mainz: 1992.
- Ursula Günther: "La fine dell‘Ars nova". In Il canto delle pietre 1992, pp. 71–87. Como: 1992.
- Ursula Günther: "Composers at the Court of the Antipopes in Avignon: Research in the Vatican Archives". In Musicology and Archival Research, Archives et Bibliothèques de Belgique 46, edited by Barbara Haggh et al., pp. 328–37. Brussels, 1994.

=== Giuseppe Verdi ===
- Ursula Günther: "La genèse de Don Carlos, opéra en cinq actes de Giuseppe Verdi, représenté pour la première fois à Paris le 11 mars 1867". Revue de Musicologie 58 (1972), pp. 16-64, and 60 (1974), pp. 87–158.
- Ursula Günther: "Documents inconnus concernant les relations de Verdi avec l'Opéra de Paris". In Il Teatro e la musica di Giuseppe Verdi, edited by, pp. 564–83. Parma, 1974.
- Ursula Günther: "Schwierigkeiten mit einer Oper. Zu den verschiedenen Fassungen des Don Carlos". In Jahrbuch der Hamburgischen Staatsoper 6 (1977/78), pp. 136–52.
- Ursula Günther: L'edizione integrale del Don Carlos di Giuseppe Verdi: Die vollständige Ausgabe des Don Carlos von Giuseppe Verdi. Milan: Ricordi, 1977.
- Ursula Günther: The Complete Edition of Don Carlos by Giuseppe Verdi., 1978.
- Ursula Günther: "Zur Revision des Don Carlos. Postscriptum zu Teil II". Analecta Musicologica 19 (1979), pp. 373–77.
- Ursula Günther and Luciano Petazzoni (eds.): Giuseppe Verdi: Don Carlos, Edizione integrale delle varie versioni in cinque e in quattro atti (comprendente gli inediti verdiani). Riduzione per canto e pianoforte con testo francese e italiano. Revisione secondo le fonti a cura di Usula Günther e Luciano Petazzoni. Milan: Ricordi, 1980 (copyright 1974).
- Ursula Günther: "La genèse du Don Carlos de Verdi: Nouveaux documents". Revue de Musicologie 72 (1986), pp. 104–17.
- Ursula Günther: "Le Don Carlos de 1883. œuvre française également". In Giuseppe Verdi: Don Carlos ( = L'Avant Scène Opéra 90/91), 36–43. Paris: 1986. German version as: "Der Don Carlos von 1883; ebenfalls ein französisches Werk". In Giuseppe Verdi: Don Carlos ( = Der Opernführer 1/2), pp. 28–39. Taufkirchen:, 1988,.
- Ursula Günther: "Don Carlos: Edizione integrale—Critical edition". In Nuove prospettive nella ricerca verdiana. Atti del convegno internazionale in occasione della prima del „Rigoletto“‘in edizione critica, Vienna 1983, edited by pp.29–48. Milan, 1987.
- Ursula Günther: "Rigoletto à Paris". In L'opera tra Venezia e Parigi, edited by, pp. 269–314. Florence, 1988.

=== Friedrich Ludwig ===
- Ursula Günther: "Friedrich Ludwig in Göttingen". In Musikwissenschaft und Musikpflege an der Georg-August-Universität Göttingen, edited by, pp. 152–75. Göttingen, 1987.

== See also ==
- Women in musicology
