= Lamentatio sanctae matris ecclesiae Constantinopolitanae =

Lamentatio sanctae matris ecclesiae Constantinopolitanae ('Lament of the Holy Mother Church of Constantinople') is a motet by the Renaissance composer Guillaume Dufay. Its topic is a lament of the fall of Constantinople to the Ottoman Turks in 1453. Because of its Byzantine subject matter, it is sometimes grouped together with Vasilissa ergo gaude, Apostolus gloriosus and Balsamus et munda cera as one of Dufay's "Byzantine motets".

== Historical context ==
The motet probably belongs to a series of four Lamentations for the fall of Constantinople composed by Dufay and mentioned for the first time in one of his letters addressed to Piero and Giovanni de' Medici. The letter must have been written on February 22, 1454, although the exact year is not specified in the text. The musical score and the texts of the French Chanson and the Latin Cantus Firmus are found in two contemporary manuscript sources: Codex 2794 (fols. 34v-36r) of the Biblioteca Riccardiana in Florence, and MS 871N (fols. 150v-151r) in Montecassino.

It is believed to have been composed in the context of the "Feast of the Pheasant", a banquet and extravagant political show organised in Lille by Philip the Good of Burgundy on 17 February 1454. Its purpose was to propagate the idea of a crusade for the recapture of the city. It is, however, unclear whether the piece was ever performed on that occasion. There are contemporary accounts of the banquet (notably the Memoirs of Olivier de la Marche, and the Chroniques of Mathieu d'Escouchy), which name and describe in much detail various pieces of music performed at it, but they fail to mention this piece. At one point in the show, according to the chronicles, an actor dressed as a woman in white satin clothes, personifying the Church of Constantinople (according to one hypothesis, played by Olivier de la Marche himself) entered the hall of the banquet riding on an elephant, to recite a "complaint and lamentation in a piteous and feminine voice" ("commença sa complainte et lamentacion à voix piteuse et femmenine"). It has been surmised that this was the moment when Dufay's motet would have been performed; other authors have conjectured that it was merely a moment of inspiration and that the motet was actually written later.

== Content and structure ==
The piece is a four-voice chanson-motet. It follows the structure of a motet insofar as it has a cantus firmus line based on Gregorian plainchant in its tenor voice, but the structure of a chanson insofar as there is only one other text sung, in French, in the upper voices. The text is a poem in Middle French, presenting the voice of a mother lamenting the sufferings of her son and addressing God as her son's father – evoking both the image of the Virgin Mary in the Lamentation of Christ, and the personification of the Church as the mystical mother of the faithful.

O tres piteulx de tout espoir fontaine,
Pere du filz dont suis mere esplorée,
Plaindre me viens a ta court souveraine,
De ta puissance et de nature humaine,
Qui ont souffert telle durté villaine
Faire à mon filz, qui tant m'a hounourée.

Dont suis de bien et de joye separée,
Sans qui vivant veule entendre mes plaints.
A toy, seul Dieu, du forfait me complains,
Du gref tourment et douloureulx oultrage,
Que voy souffrir au plus bel des humains.
Sans nul confort de tout humain lignage.

O most merciful fount of all hope,
Father of the son whose weeping mother I am:
I come to complain before your sovereign court,
about your power and about human nature,
which have allowed such grievous harm
to be done to my son, who has honored me so much.

For that I am bereft of all good and joy,
without anyone alive willing to hear my laments.
To you, the only God, I submit my complaints,
about the grievous torment and sorrowful outrage,
which I see the most beautiful of men suffer
without any comfort from the whole human race.

The tenor text is a modified quotation taken from the Book of Lamentations (1.2), the biblical lament about the fall of Jerusalem: Omnes amici ejus spreverunt eam, non est qui consoletur eam ex omnibus caris ejus. ('All her friends have scorned her; of all her beloved ones there is not one to comfort her.'),
