= Gilbert Reaney =

English musicologist (1924–2008)

- Born: 11 January 1924; Sheffield, England, UK
- Died: 22 March 2008 (aged 84); Reading, Berkshire, UK

Academic background
- Education: University of Sheffield

Academic work
- Discipline: Early music and music theory
- Institutions: UCLA; American Institute of Musicology

Gilbert Reaney (11 January 1924 – 22 March 2008) was an English musicologist who specialized in medieval and Renaissance music, theory and literature. Described as "one of the most prolific and influential musicologists of the past century", Reaney made significant contributions to his fields of expertise, particularly on the life and works of Guillaume de Machaut, as well as medieval music theory.

Born in Sheffield, Reaney studied French and music at the University of Sheffield, where he received three degrees: a Bachelor of Arts, Bachelor of Music and Master of Arts. For the latter, he wrote a dissertation on the formes fixes of Machaut, inaugurating a life-long scholarly interest in the composer. After stints at the Universities of Reading, Birmingham, and Hamburg he became an associate professor at the University of California, Los Angeles. He was a Professor of Music there from 1963 until his retirement in 1997. A long-time associate of the American Institute of Musicology, he was associate editor (1955–1992) of their journal, Musica Disciplina, under Armen Carapetyan, and then co-editor (1992–2008) with Frank A. D'Accone.

Among Reaney's notable publications are the book Guillaume de Machaut (1971) for the Oxford Studies of Composers series; new editions on various early music composers; major new editions of works by music theorists Franco of Cologne, Philippe de Vitry and John Hothby; and at least 34 articles on a variety of subjects for The New Grove Dictionary of Music and Musicians and the subsequent Grove Music Online.

== Early life and education ==
Gilbert Reaney was born in Sheffield, England on 11 January 1924; his father was an amateur musician. In 1942 he began studying music and French at the University of Sheffield. He halted his studies after only a year, enlisting in the British army and often performing at "camp concerts" with pieces such as Richard Addinsell's Warsaw Concerto. Resuming his education in 1946, he received both a Bachelor of Arts (1948) and a Bachelor of Music (1951) from the University of Sheffield. Also in 1951, he took a Master of Arts, with a dissertation on the formes fixes (rondeaus, virelais and ballades) of Guillaume de Machaut. His studies brought him to the Sorbonne in Paris, where—on a grant from the French government—he studied the Roman de Fauvel manuscript, the main source of ars nova medieval music, literature and art. The music historian Tess Knighton notes that Reaney did not write a doctoral dissertation; this is standard to be promoted as a Professor of Music in the 21st-century, but was not at the time.

== Career ==
=== Institutions and organizations ===
Returning to England, Reaney was research fellow at the University of Reading (from 1953 to 1956) and then the University of Birmingham (1956 to 1959). While at Reading and Birmingham, Reaney founded and regularly directed the London Medieval Group, an early music ensemble which he regularly joined on tour in both the United Kingdom and Continental Europe. At this time he also appeared on various programmes on BBC Radio 3, giving frequent talks on early music. Following a brief stint as visiting professor at the University of Hamburg (1959–1960), he taught at the University of California, Los Angeles (UCLA), as an associate professor in 1961. By the 1960s, Reany had become an established authority on early music. He was the first recipient of the Dent medal (1961), an annual award for musicology offered by the Royal Musical Association (named for Edward Joseph Dent). Reany became a Professor of Music at UCLA in 1963 and remained so until his retirement in 1997, at which point he was made an emeritus professor.

Reaney was long associated with the American Institute of Musicology (AIM). Knighton noted that during the mid 20th-century many English scholars of early music were closely associated with organizations in the United States, as they were the most prominent and developed in the field. AIM's music journal Musica Disciplina was created in 1945, and in 1952 published two of Reaney's articles on Machaut. He continued contributing articles to the journal throughout the 1950s, chiefly on ars nova topics. In 1955, the institute's founder and editor of Musica Disciplina, Armen Carapetyan, invited Reaney to become the associate editor of the journal. After Carapetyan's death in 1992, Reaney became co-editor of Musica Disciplina with his UCLA colleague Frank A. D'Accone.

=== Scholarship ===
A prolific, influential and frequently cited scholar, Reaney wrote books, catalogues, articles and editions. Musicologist Ursula Günther characterizes his output as having a "characteristic objectivity, clarity of argument, a concise style and thorough knowledge of widely varying subjects". His research spanned a variety of topics in medieval and Renaissance music, theory and literature. His most important contributions, however, are on the life and works of Machaut, as well as medieval music theory. Beginning with his 1952 dissertation, Reaney published a variety of scholarship on the Machaut. This included studies on Machaut's formes fixes, lais, performance, and numerous articles in encyclopedias such as Encyclopédie de la musique and Encyclopaedia Britannica. By way of an interdisciplinary approach of both music and literature, he developed new theories on the performance of how medieval musicians performed Machaut's music, influencing the practices of early music groups such as Gothic Voices led by Christopher Page. Much of his Machaut research culminated in Guillaume de Machaut (1971), a book-length treatment of the subject for the Oxford Studies of Composers series.

A prominent scholar on medieval music theory, by 1966 Reaney was the general editor for AIM's Corpus scriptorum de musica (CSM), which involved research on at least ten modern editions of medieval manuscripts, including new publications of music theory works by Franco of Cologne and Philippe de Vitry. In particular, the 1974 edition of Franco's influential Ars cantus mensurabilis by Reaney and André Gilles remains the standard critical edition. Also in 1966, Reaney became the editor for the Répertoire International des Sources Musicales's series of early music manuscripts. The latter series, which Reaney edited until 1969, was characterized by Knighton as "the bible for scholars of medieval music". Other theorists who Reaney published modern editions on include John Hothby.

== Personal life ==
Reaney never married; he claimed, in the words of the obituarist John T. Good, "no wife would want a husband so constantly away from home". Good also described him as a fine pianist with a substantial repertoire. He died in Reading, Berkshire at the age of 84 on 22 March 2008.

== Selected publications ==
=== Books ===
- Reaney, Gilbert (1952a). The Ballades, Rondeaux and Virelais Set to Music by Guillaume de Machaut (M. A.). University of Sheffield. OCLC 966512433.
- Reaney, Gilbert (1971). Guillaume de Machaut. Oxford Studies of Composers. Oxford, England: Oxford University Press. ISBN 978-0-19-315218-2.

=== Editions ===
- Reaney, Gilbert, ed. (1966). Early Fifteenth-Century Music. Corpus mensurabilis musicae 11. Vol. 3, Collected Works of Richard Loqueville, Estienne Grossin, R. Libert, and Benoit. Cambridge: American Institute of Musicology. OCLC 679376469.
- ——; Gilles, André, eds. (1974). Franconis de Colonia Ars cantus mensurabilis. Corpus mensurabilis musicae. Vol. 18. Cambridge: American Institute of Musicology. OCLC 55555076.

=== Articles ===
- Reaney, Gilbert (1952b). "A Chronology of the Ballades, Rondeaux and Virelais Set to Music by Guillaume de Machaut". Musica Disciplina. 6 (1/3). American Institute of Musicology Verlag Corpusmusicae, GmbH: 33–38. JSTOR 20531841.
- —— (1952c). "Concerning the Origins of the Rondeau, Virelai and Ballade Forms". Musica Disciplina. 6 (4). American Institute of Musicology Verlag Corpusmusicae, GmbH: 155–166. JSTOR 20531852.
- —— (1953). "Fourteenth Century Harmony and the Ballades, Rondeaux and Virelais of Guillaume de Machaut". Musica Disciplina. 7. American Institute of Musicology Verlag Corpusmusicae, GmbH: 129–146. JSTOR 20531864.
- —— (1954). "The Manuscript Chantilly, Musée Condé 1047". Musica Disciplina. 8. American Institute of Musicology Verlag Corpusmusicae, GmbH: 59–113. JSTOR 20531876.
- —— (1955a). "The Manuscript Oxford, Bodleian Library, Canonici Misc. 213". Musica Disciplina. 9. American Institute of Musicology Verlag Corpusmusicae, GmbH: 73–104. JSTOR 20531889.
- —— (1955b). "The Ballades, Rondeaux and Virelais of Guillaume de Machaut: Melody, Rhythm and Form". Acta Musicologica. 27 (1/2): 40–58. doi:10.2307/931552. JSTOR 931552.
- —— (1955c). "The Manuscript Oxford, Bodleian Library, Canonici Misc. 213". Musica Disciplina. 9. American Institute of Musicology Verlag Corpusmusicae, GmbH: 73–104. JSTOR 20531889.
- —— (1955–1956). "The 'Lais' of Guillaume de Machaut and Their Background". Proceedings of the Royal Musical Association. 82nd Sess.: 15–32. doi:10.1093/jrma/82.1.15. JSTOR 765865.
- —— (1956). "A Postscript to 'The Manuscript Chantilly, Musee Conde 1047'". Musica Disciplina. 10. American Institute of Musicology Verlag Corpusmusicae, GmbH: 55–59. JSTOR 40468213.
- —— (1956). "Voices and Instruments in the Music of Guillaume de Machaut". Revue belge de Musicologie / Belgisch Tijdschrift voor Muziekwetenschap. 10 (1/2): 93–104. doi:10.2307/3686256. JSTOR 3686256.
- —— (1956). "Voices and Instruments in the Music of Guillaume de Machaut (Continuation)". Revue belge de Musicologie / Belgisch Tijdschrift voor Muziekwetenschap. 10 (3/4): 93–104. doi:10.2307/3686158. JSTOR 3686158.
- —— (1957). "The Greek Background of Medieval Musical Thought". Monthly Musical Record. 87: 124–130.
- —— (1958). "Machaut's Influence on Late Medieval Music". Monthly Musical Record. 88: 50–58.
- —— (January 1958). "Guillaume de Machaut: Lyric Poet". Music & Letters. 39 (1). Oxford University Press: 38–51. doi:10.1093/ml/XXXIX.1.38. JSTOR 730363.
- —— (1958). "The Manuscript London, British Museum, Additional 29987 (Lo)". Musica Disciplina. 12. American Institute of Musicology Verlag Corpusmusicae, GmbH: 67–91. JSTOR 20531900.
- —— (1959). "The Poetic Form of Machaut's Musical Works: I: The Ballades, Rondeaux and Virelais". Musica Disciplina. 13. American Institute of Musicology Verlag Corpusmusicae, GmbH: 25–41. JSTOR 20531910.
- —— (1959). "The "Roman de Fauvel" and its Music". Monthly Musical Record. 89: 99–103.
- —— (1960). "The Manuscript Paris, Bibliotheque Nationale, Fonds Italien 568 (Pit)". Musica Disciplina. 14. American Institute of Musicology Verlag Corpusmusicae, GmbH: 33–63. JSTOR 20531924.
- —— (1961). "Some Little-Known Sources of Medieval Polyphony in England". Musica Disciplina. 15. American Institute of Musicology Verlag Corpusmusicae, GmbH: 15–26. JSTOR 20531935.
- —— (1964). "The Question of Authorship in the Medieval Treatises on Music". Musica Disciplina. 18. American Institute of Musicology Verlag Corpusmusicae, GmbH: 7–17. JSTOR 20531977.
- —— (1967). "Towards a Chronology of Machaut's Musical Works". Musica Disciplina. 21. American Institute of Musicology Verlag Corpusmusicae, GmbH: 87–96. JSTOR 20532020.
- —— (1971). "Accidentals and Fourteenth Century Counterpoint in England". Quadrivium. 12/1: 195–208.
- —— (1977). "Music in the Late Medieval Entremets". Annales Musicologiques. VII: 51–65.
- —— (1977). "The Part Played by Instruments in the Music of Guillaume de Machaut". Studi musicali. 6: 3–11.
- —— (1979). "Transposition and "Key" Signatures in Late Medieval Music". Musica Disciplina. 33. American Institute of Musicology Verlag Corpusmusicae, GmbH: 27–41. JSTOR 20532214.
- —— (1982). "The Chronology and Structure of the Roman de Fauvel". International Musicological Society: Congress Report. XIII (2). Strasbourg: 94–102.
- —— (1984). "The Social Implications of Polyphonic Mass Music in Fourteenth Century England". Musica Disciplina. 38. American Institute of Musicology Verlag Corpusmusicae, GmbH: 159–172. JSTOR 20532274.
- —— (1987). "The "International" Style and the Oxford Manuscript, Bodleian Library, Canonici Misc. 213". Musica Disciplina. 41. American Institute of Musicology Verlag Corpusmusicae, GmbH: 15–26. JSTOR 20532302.
- —— (1988). "The Musical Theory of John Hothby". Revue belge de Musicologie / Belgisch Tijdschrift voor Muziekwetenschap. 42: 119–133. doi:10.2307/3687105. JSTOR 3687105.

=== Chapters ===
- —— (1959). "Musica ficta in the works of Guillaume de Machaut". L'ars nova: recueil d'études sur la musique du XIVe siècle. Colloques de Wégimont, II, 1955. Paris: Les Belles Lettres. pp. 196–213. OCLC 4401798.
- —— (1959). "A Note on Conductus Rhythm". In Abraham, Gerald (ed.). Bericht über den siebenten internationalen musikwissenschaftlichen Kongress: Köln 1958. Kassel: Bärenreiter. pp. 219–221. OCLC 6881800.
- —— (1963). "Modes in the 14th century, in particular in the music of Guillaume de Machaut". Organicae voces: Festschrift Joseph Smits van Waesberghe. Amsterdam: Institut voor Middeleeuwse Muziekwetenschap. pp. 137–144.
- — — in Jones, Charles W. (1963). The Saint Nicholas Liturgy and its Literary Relationships (Ninth to Twelfth Centuries). Berkeley: University of California Press. OCLC 186292744.
- —— (1966). "The Performance of Medieval Music". In LaRue, Jan (ed.). Aspects of Medieval and Renaissance Music: a Birthday Offering to Gustave Reese. New York: W. W. Norton & Company. pp. 704–722. OCLC 854429.
- —— (1966). "Notes on the Harmonic Technique of Guillaume de Machaut". In Tischler, Hans (ed.). Essays in Musicology: a Birthday Offering for Willi Apel. Bloomington: Indiana University Bloomington. pp. 63–68. OCLC 180704.
- —— (1978). "Sequence, Hocket, Syncopation and Imitation in Zacar's Mass Movements". In Ziino, Agostino [in Italian] (ed.). L'Ars Nova italiana del Trecento, iv: La musica al tempo del Boccaccio e i suoi rapporti con la letteratura: Siena and Certaldo 1975. Certaldo: Edizioni Centro di Studi sull'Ars Nova Italiana del Trecento. pp. 345–363. OCLC 1124179468.
- —— (1982). "La tonalité des ballades et des rondeaux de Guillaume de Machaut". Guillaume de Machaut: Poète et Compositeur. Colloque-Table Ronde organisé par l'Université de Reims (19-22 avril, 1978). Vol. 3. Paris: Klincksieck. pp. 295–300. OCLC 310644044.
- —— (1983). "Intabulation techniques in the Faenza and Buxheim Keyboard Manuscripts". Schweizerisches Jb für Musikwissenschaft. Vol. 3. pp. 41–46.
- —— (1984). "Musical and Textual Relationships among Early 15th-Century Manuscripts". In Dittmer, L.A. (ed.). Gordon Athol Anderson (1929-1981) In Memoriam von seinen Studenten, Freunden und Kollegen, Musicological Studies. Henryville: Institute of Mediaeval Music. pp. 495–504.

=== Grove articles ===
Grove Music Online. Oxford, England: Oxford University Press. 2001 (subscription, Wikilibrary access, or UK public library membership required)

- Reaney, Gilbert (2001). "Alamani, Jo". Grove Music Online. doi:10.1093/gmo/9781561592630.article.00397.
- —— (2001). "Andrieu, F.". Grove Music Online. doi:10.1093/gmo/9781561592630.article.00904.
- —— (2001). "Borlet". Borlet. Grove Music Online. doi:10.1093/gmo/9781561592630.article.03608.
- —— (2001). "Bosquet". Bosquet. Grove Music Online. doi:10.1093/gmo/9781561592630.article.14354.
- —— (2001). "Boy Monachus, Hugo". Grove Music Online. doi:10.1093/gmo/9781561592630.article.03783.
- —— (2001). "Caserta, Philippus de". Caserta, Philippus de. Grove Music Online. doi:10.1093/gmo/9781561592630.article.43682.
- —— (2001). "Chipre". Grove Music Online. doi:10.1093/gmo/9781561592630.article.05622.
- —— (2001). "Cordier, Baude". Cordier, Baude. Grove Music Online. doi:10.1093/gmo/9781561592630.article.06474.
- —— (2001). "Defronciaco". Defronciaco. Grove Music Online. doi:10.1093/gmo/9781561592630.article.07391.
- —— (2001). "Depansis". Depansis. Grove Music Online. doi:10.1093/gmo/9781561592630.article.07579.
- —— (2001). "Egidius [Aegidius] de Murino". Grove Music Online. doi:10.1093/gmo/9781561592630.article.08612.
- —— (2001). "Eustacius Leodiensis". Grove Music Online. doi:10.1093/gmo/9781561592630.article.09089.
- —— (2001). "Fabri, Martinus". Grove Music Online. doi:10.1093/gmo/9781561592630.article.09181.
- —— (2001). "Fleurie". Fleurie. Grove Music Online. doi:10.1093/gmo/9781561592630.article.09821.
- —— (2001). "Garinus". Grove Music Online. doi:10.1093/gmo/9781561592630.article.10673.
- —— (2001). "Gaston Fébus, 3rd Count of Foix and 11th of Béarn". Gaston Fébus, 3rd Count of Foix and 11th of Béarn. Grove Music Online. doi:10.1093/gmo/9781561592630.article.10722.
- —— (2001). "Graneti, Johannes". Graneti, Johannes. Grove Music Online. doi:10.1093/gmo/9781561592630.article.11622.
- —— (2001). "Goslenus". Grove Music Online. doi:10.1093/gmo/9781561592630.article.11498.
- —— (2001). "Guymont". Guymont. Grove Music Online. doi:10.1093/gmo/9781561592630.article.12070.
- —— (2001). "Jehan Lebeuf d'Abbeville en Pontieu". Grove Music Online. doi:10.1093/gmo/9781561592630.article.14240.
- —— (2001). "Johannes de Meruco". Grove Music Online. doi:10.1093/gmo/9781561592630.article.14362.
- —— (2001). "Lambuleti, Johannes". Lambuleti, Johannes. Grove Music Online. doi:10.1093/gmo/9781561592630.article.15896.
- —— (2001). "Landis, Clericus de". Grove Music Online. doi:10.1093/gmo/9781561592630.article.15944.
- —— (2001). "Loqueville, Richard". Grove Music Online. doi:10.1093/gmo/9781561592630.article.16976.
- —— (2001). "Loys". Grove Music Online. doi:10.1093/gmo/9781561592630.article.17079.
- —— (2001). "Molins, P(ierre) des". Grove Music Online. doi:10.1093/gmo/9781561592630.article.18887.
- —— (2001). "Murrin, Jacobus". Murrin, Jacobus. Grove Music Online. doi:10.1093/gmo/9781561592630.article.19382.
- —— (2001). "Olivier, Jo(hannes)". Grove Music Online. doi:10.1093/gmo/9781561592630.article.20320.
- —— (2001). "Orles". Orles. Grove Music Online. doi:10.1093/gmo/9781561592630.article.20475.
- —— (2001). "Perrinet". Grove Music Online. doi:10.1093/gmo/9781561592630.article.21370.
- —— (2001). "Royllart, Philippus". Grove Music Online. doi:10.1093/gmo/9781561592630.article.24020.
- —— (2001). "Sale". Grove Music Online. doi:10.1093/gmo/9781561592630.article.24366.
- —— (2001). "Theodoricus de Campo". Grove Music Online. doi:10.1093/gmo/9781561592630.article.27800.
- —— (2001). "Willelmus". Willelmus. Grove Music Online. doi:10.1093/gmo/9781561592630.article.30332.

== Sources ==
- D'Accone, Frank A. (2003–2008). "In Memoriam Gilbert Reaney". Musica Disciplina. 53. American Institute of Musicology Verlag Corpusmusicae, GmbH: 5. JSTOR 30249355.
- Good, John T. (16 June 2008). "Gilbert Reaney". The Guardian.
- Günther, Ursula (2001). "Reaney, Gilbert". Grove Music Online. Oxford: Oxford University Press. doi:10.1093/gmo/9781561592630.article.22998. ISBN 978-1-56159-263-0. (subscription, Wikilibrary access, or UK public library membership required)
- "The Dent Medal". Journal of the Royal Musical Association. 134 (1). Taylor & Francis, Ltd.: 161–163. 2009. doi:10.1080/14716930902756992. JSTOR 40783135. S2CID 220459806.
- Knighton, Tess (August 2008). "In Memoriam Gilbert Reaney". Early Music. 36 (3). Oxford University Press: 503–504. doi:10.1093/em/can079. JSTOR 27655237.
- Payne, Thomas (22 April 2013). "Organum". Oxford Bibliographies: Music. Oxford: Oxford University Press. doi:10.1093/OBO/9780199757824-0125. (subscription required)
- "Gilbert Reaney: Musicologist who was a leading pioneer in the study of medieval music". The Times. No. 69, 306. London. 24 April 2008. p. 62.
