= Journal of the Royal Musical Association =

- Discipline: Musicology
- Language: English
- Edited by: Freya Jarman, University of Liverpool

Publication details
- Former name(s): Proceedings of the Musical Association (1874–1944), Proceedings of the Royal Musical Association (1945–1986)
- History: 1874–present
- Publisher: Cambridge University Press
- Frequency: Biannually

Standard abbreviations
- ISO 4: J. R. Music. Assoc.

Indexing
- ISSN: 0269-0403 (print); 1471-6933 (web)
- LCCN: 87655755
- OCLC no.: 473768778

Links
- Journal homepage; Online access; Online archive

Journal of the Royal Musical Association is a peer-reviewed academic journal covering fields ranging from historical and critical musicology to theory and analysis, ethnomusicology, and popular music studies. The journal is published by Cambridge University Press on behalf of the Royal Musical Association and the editor-in-chief is Freya Jarman.

== Abstracting and indexing ==
The journal is abstracted and indexed in:

- Arts & Humanities Citation Index
- British Humanities Index
- EBSCOhost
- Répertoire International de Littérature Musicale
- Scopus
