= John Caldwell (musicologist) =

English musicologist and composer

John Anthony Caldwell (born 6 July 1938) is an English musicologist and composer.

== Life ==
Caldwell was born in Bebington, Cheshire and studied the organ at the Matthay School of Music in Liverpool, becoming a Fellow of the Royal College of Organists in 1957. He studied at Keble College, Oxford, obtaining his B.A. in 1960, B.Mus. in 1961 and D.Phil. in 1965. For his doctorate, he transcribed and edited a manuscript of English liturgical organ music from between 1548 and 1650. He was an assistant lecturer at Bristol University from 1963 to 1966, before returning to Oxford University as a lecturer in 1966, holding this position until 1996 when he was appointed a Reader. He was a Fellow of Keble College from 1967 to 1992. He became a senior research fellow of Jesus College, Oxford in 1999 and given the title of Professor by the University Distinctions Committee. He became an Emeritus Fellow on his retirement in 2005.

His main areas of interest are medieval and Renaissance music, music theory and keyboard music. In one of his late articles dedicated to early witnesses of Western modal music and music theory he suggested to consider modality not to be bound up with 8 "standard" church tones, but to treat it as a unifying concept for Western chant.

His compositions include the opera-oratorio Good Friday, first performed in Oxford in February 1998 and Ecce sacerdos magnus for the Choirs of All Saints' Church, Northampton.
