= Corpus mensurabilis musicae =

The Corpus mensurabilis musicae (CMM) (Latin for "measurable body of music") is a collected print edition of most of the sacred and secular vocal music of the late medieval and Renaissance period in western music history, with an emphasis on the central Franco-Flemish and Italian repertories. CMM is a publication of the American Institute of Musicology, and consists of 109 series (individual volumes or sets of volumes) as of 2007. Renowned composers whose works have appeared in other collected editions, such as Josquin des Prez, Giovanni Pierluigi da Palestrina, and Orlande de Lassus, are generally excluded from the set.

Many of the series are devoted to works of a single composer, and in some cases they are organized into sub-volumes because of their size (for example, "Volume 1" contains the works of Guillaume Dufay; it actually consists of 6 separate bound volumes, separately containing motets, masses, mass fragments, other liturgical music, and secular songs). Other series contain anthologies and contents of codices and manuscripts, documents which typically compile the work of many composers: for example, series 46 has the complete Old Hall Manuscript of music from early 15th-century England, and series 85 has the six anonymous L'homme armé masses from Naples.

Most of the editions are prefaced by biographical notes as well as notes on the transcriptions. The work was begun by Armen Carapetyan, who founded the American Institute of Musicology in 1944; work on CMM began in 1947, and continues to the present day, with the volumes continually being updated and reissued. After Carapetyan's death in 1992, Gilbert Reaney and Frank D'Accone became co-editors; after Reaney's death in 2008 and until his death in 2022 D'Accone was the sole editor.

Other related publications of the American Institute of Musicology include the Corpus of Early Keyboard Music (CEKM), the Corpus scriptorum de musica (CSM), containing editions of writings about music by early music theorists, and the Musica Disciplina (MD), which publishes current scholarly work on early music.
