= Theodore II Palaiologos =

- Despotes
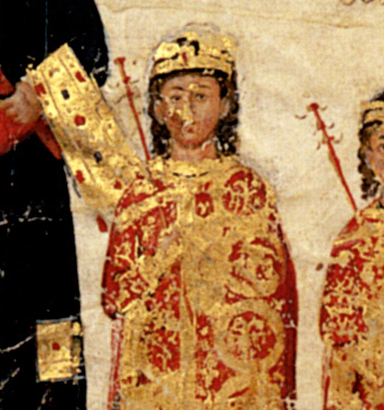
- Theodore as a youth c. 1405

Despot of the Morea
- Reign: 1407–1443
- Predecessor: Theodore I Palaiologos
- Successor: Constantine Palaiologos and Thomas Palaiologos
- Co-regent: Constantine Palaiologos (1428–1443); Thomas Palaiologos (1428–1443)

Despot in Selymbria
- Reign: 1443–1448
- Born: c. 1396
- Died: 21 June 1448 (aged c. 52); Selymbria (modern-day Silivri, İstanbul, Turkey)
- Spouse: Cleofa Malatesta
- Issue: Helena, Queen of Cyprus and Armenia
- Dynasty: Palaiologos
- Father: Manuel II Palaiologos
- Mother: Helena Dragaš
- Religion: Greek Orthodox

Theodore II Palaiologos or Palaeologus (Greek: Θεόδωρος Β΄ Παλαιολόγος, Theodōros II Palaiologos) (c. 1396 – 21 June 1448) was Despot in the Morea from 1407 to 1443 and in Selymbria from then until his death.

== Life ==
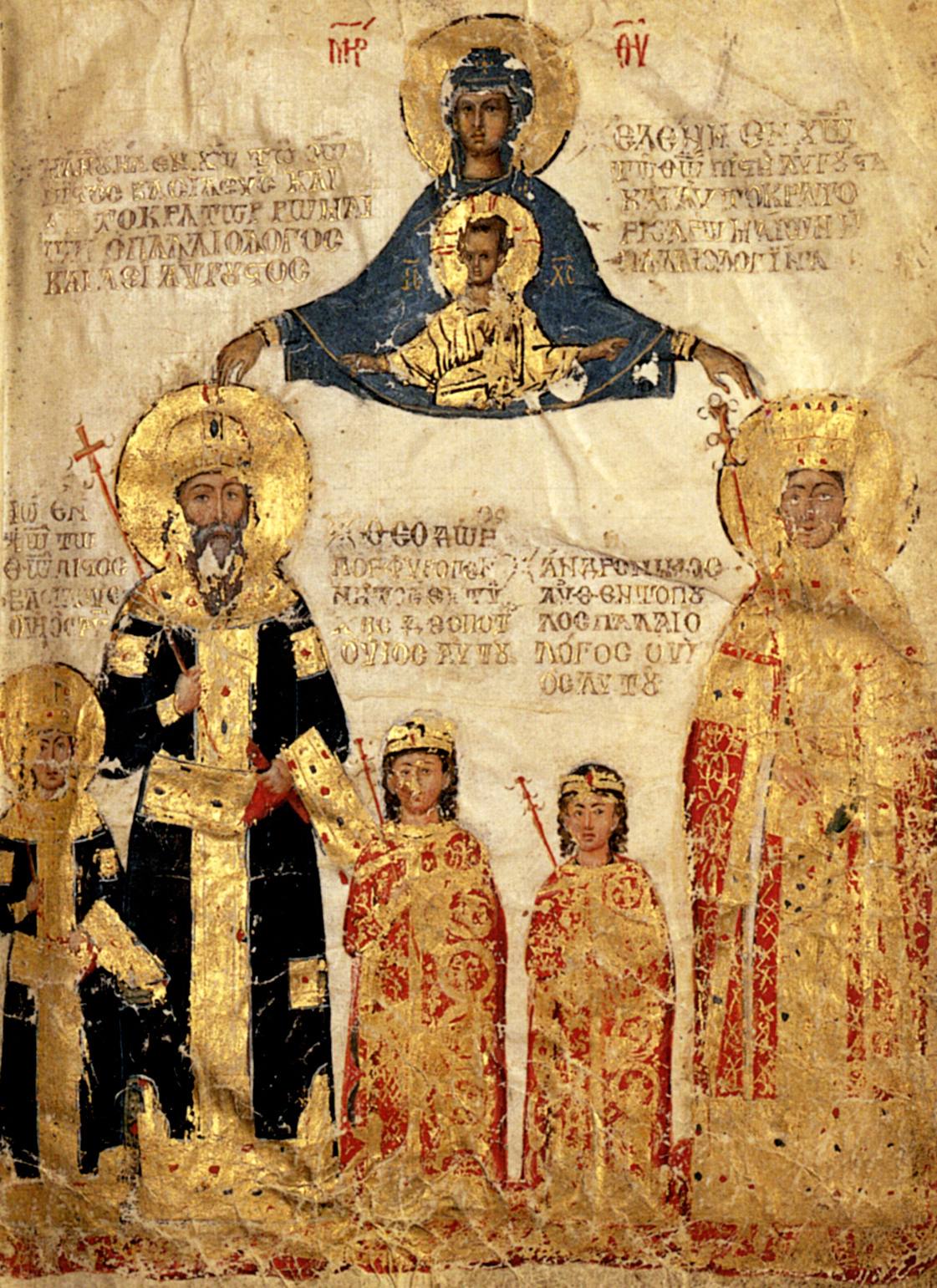
Theodore (third from left) as a youth with his parents and brothers

Theodore II Palaiologos was a son of the Byzantine Emperor Manuel II Palaiologos and his wife Helena Dragaš. His maternal grandfather was the Serb prince Constantine Dragaš. His brothers included emperors John VIII Palaiologos and Constantine XI Palaiologos, as well as Demetrios Palaiologos and Thomas Palaiologos, despots in the Despotate of Morea, and Andronikos Palaiologos, despot in Thessalonica.

When Theodore was a little over ten years old, his father proclaimed him a despot (despotēs) and appointed him to govern Morea after the death of his uncle Theodore I Palaiologos in 1407. The nobleman Nicholas Eudaimonoioannes was appointed as his tutor and regent until he came of age. The first period of his rule was a time of war against the Latin states in Greece for the unification of Morea. Theodore II's enemies in that period included the Republic of Venice, which sent troops to impede his attempt to conquer Patras. During Theodore's minority, his father Emperor Manuel II stayed in Morea and supervised its administration and defense, rebuilding the Hexamilion wall across the Isthmus of Corinth.

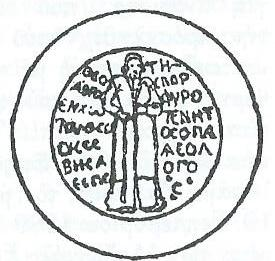
Theodore's seal as Despot of the Morea

A moment of drastic change in policy was his marriage to the Latin noblewoman Cleofa Malatesta, arranged with the help of her uncle Pope Martin V, who became Theodore's ally and supporter. In a letter from around the time of Manuel II's death (July 21, 1425), Pope Martin V called Theodore II emperor of Constantinople (ad Theodorum imperatorem constantinopolitanum) but the crown actually passed to his older brother John VIII.

The war in Morea had started to go against the Byzantines and, under pressure from Carlo I Tocco, the Count of Kefalonia and ruler of Epirus, the Despot demanded help from his brother John VIII. That help came in the form of reinforcements led by their brother Constantine, who became joint governor of Morea with Theodore II in 1428. The united efforts of the brothers contributed to the naval victory at the Echinades in 1427 and the conquest of Patras in 1430.

On the other hand, Emperor John VIII declared Theodore's younger brother Constantine regent of the empire during his voyage to Florence in 1438, which emphasized his selection of Constantine as his intended heir. The next several years were marred by disputes with Constantine over the succession to the childless John VIII. In a compromise, Theodore II Palaiologos surrendered his claim to the throne in exchange for Constantine's domain (appanage) of Selymbria (Silivri) in 1443, where he died of plague five years later, in 1448, predeceasing his brothers.

== Family ==
By his marriage to Cleofa Malatesta, an Italian aristocrat, Theodore II Palaiologos had at least one daughter:

1. Helena Palaiologina. She married King John II of Cyprus.

== Bibliography ==
- Nicol, Donald M. (1993) [1972]. The Last Centuries of Byzantium, 1261-1453. Cambridge: Cambridge University Press. ISBN 9780521439916.
- Kazhdan, Alexander, ed. (1991). The Oxford Dictionary of Byzantium. Oxford and New York: Oxford University Press. ISBN 0-19-504652-8.
- Joseph Freiherr von Hammer-Purgstall "Geschichte des Osmanischen Reiches"
- Edward Gibbon "The History of the Decline and Fall of the Roman Empire"
- George Sphrantzes : The Fall of the Byzantine Empire

Theodore II Palaiologos Palaiologos dynasty Born: c. 1396 Died: 1448
Regnal titles
Preceded by Theodore I Palaiologos	Despot of the Morea; 1407–1443	Succeeded by Constantine Palaiologos
