= American Institute of Musicology =

American early music research organization

- Formation: 1944; 82 years ago
- Purpose: Research and publications on early music (medieval, Renaissance and early Baroque)
- Headquarters: Rome, Italy
- Website: www.corpusmusicae.com

The American Institute of Musicology (AIM) is a musicological organization that researches, promotes and produces publications on early music. Founded in 1944 by Armen Carapetyan, the AIM's chief objective is the publication of modern editions of medieval, Renaissance and early Baroque compositions and works of music theory. The breadth and quality of publications produced by the AIM constitutes a central contribution to the study, practice and performance of early music.

Among the series it produces are the Corpus mensurabilis musicae (CMM), Corpus Scriptorum de Musica (CSM) and Corpus of Early Keyboard Music (CEKM). In CMM specifically, the AIM has published the entire surviving oeuvres of a considerable amount of composers, most notably the complete works of Guillaume de Machaut and Guillaume Du Fay, among many others. The CSM, which focuses on music theory, has published the treatises of important theorists such as Guido of Arezzo and Jean Philippe Rameau.

The AIM is based in Rome, with offices in Cambridge, Massachusetts. Since 1946, the AIM has published Musica Disciplina, an annual academic journal of early music scholarly work. Musicologists who have been particularly associated with the AIM include John Caldwell, Frank D'Accone, Ursula Gunther, Charles Hamm, Albert Seay and Gilbert Reaney.

== History ==
Armen Carapetyan (1908–1992), an Iranian-Armenian born in Isfahan, graduated from the American College of Tehran in 1927 and studied in Paris and New York, at one point under Gian Francesco Malipiero. Carapetyan then received both a Master's degree and PhD in musicology from Harvard University. At the time, there was substantial research devoted to the literature, architecture and visual arts of the medieval and Renaissance periods, but comparatively little on music of the same period. To address such a discrepancy, Carapetyan founded the Institute of Renaissance and Baroque Music in 1944, based in Cambridge, Massachusetts. The organization became truly active the following year, and in 1946 it was renamed as the American Institute of Musicology (AIM) with a new headquarters in Rome, Italy. The earlier offices in Cambridge remained, however, and the AIM established offices in Dallas, whose publications transferred to Hänssler-Verlag, Stuttgart by 1974.

For its first few years, the AIM maintained an advisory board of noted musicologists from around the world. Such scholars included Willi Apel, Gustave Reese and Egon Wellesz among many others; by 1949, however, Carapetyan assumed solo leadership until his death in 1992. As part of Carapetyan's original plan to include musical performances in the AIM, an early music choir was created in 1947, but soon disbanded. Also part of the original plan, the AIM held advanced course on early music in the summers. The first was near the headquarters in Rome, with the second at the Torre di Bellosguardo in Florence.

== Publications ==
The chief purpose of the AIM is to produce high-quality modern editions of early music compositions and works of music theory. Since 1946, the AIM has produced over 650 publications on a variety of topics. These include the complete works of two of the most significant early European composers, Guillaume de Machaut and Guillaume Du Fay. Other composers whose entire surviving oeuvres have been published by AIM include Pierre de la Rue, Adrian Willaert, Jacob Clemens non Papa, Cipriano de Rore, Loyset Compère, Thomas Crecquillon and Romero; modern editions of famous musical treatises include those by Guido of Arezzo and Jean Philippe Rameau. The primary series that the AIM maintains are:

- The Corpus mensurabilis musicae (CMM), general editor formerly Frank D'Accone, encompasses medieval and Renaissance music. The series serves as a vehicle for the publishing of the all surviving compositions by specific composers.
- The Corpus Scriptorum de Musica (CSM), general editor formerly Gilbert Reaney, publishes extant musical theory treatises in their original languages, usually Latin. English introduction are provided in each.
- The Musicological Studies and Documents, general editor formerly Ursula Gunther, consists of modern evaluations, commentaries and studies on early music. The series often includes topics which do not fall under the scope of CMM or CSM.
- Miscellanea, created by Carapetyan for materials not appropriate to other series, notably reproducing the facsimile of Rameau's theoretical treatise.
- The Renaissance Manuscript Studies, general editor formerly Charles Hamm, contains complete catalogues of early music sources.
- The Corpus of Early Keyboard Music (CEKM), general editor John Caldwell, covers keyboard music until the 17th-century and reproduces them in modern notation.

== Musica Disciplina ==
Musica Disciplina
- Discipline: Music
- Language: English
- Edited by: Inga Mai Groote

Publication details
- History: 1946-present
- Frequency: Annually

Standard abbreviations
- ISO 4: Musica Discip.

Indexing
- ISSN: 0077-2461
- JSTOR: musidisc
- OCLC no.: 782070210

The AIM publishes Musica Disciplina (MD), an annual academic journal for scholarly work on medieval, Renaissance and early Baroque music. Articles in the journal include analysis, studies and inventory of primary sources relating to early music. Founded in 1946, the journal was known as the Journal of Renaissance and Baroque Music for its first year of publication. MD does not engage in reviews.

Carapetyan was the chief editor of the journal until his death in 1992. Reaney and D'Accone then became co-editors, until Reaney's death in 2008 where D'Accone became the sole general editor until his death in 2022. The current editor is Inga Mai Groote of the University of Zürich.

=== Selected publications ===
For a longer list, see Carapetyan 1996

- van Waesberghe, Jos Smits [in Dutch] (1951). "The Musical Notation of Guido of Arezzo". Musica Disciplina. 5: 15–53. JSTOR 20531824.
- Pirrotta, Nino (1955). "Marchettus de Padua and the Italian Ars Nova". Musica Disciplina. 9: 57–71. JSTOR 20531887.
- Trowell, Brian (1959). "Faburden and Fauxbourdon". Musica Disciplina. 13: 43–78. JSTOR 20531911.
- Bent, Margaret (1972). "Musica Recta and Musica Ficta". Musica Disciplina. 26: 73–100. JSTOR 20532145.
- Berger, Carol (1981). "The Hand and the Art of Memory". Musica Disciplina. 35: 87–120. JSTOR 20532236.
- Bent, Margaret (1987). "A Contemporary Perception of Early Fifteenth-Century Style; Bologna Q15 as a Document of Scribal Editorial Initiative". Musica Disciplina. 41: 183–201. JSTOR 20532309.
- Everist, Mark (2013). "Master and Disciple: Teaching the Composition of Polyphony in the Thirteenth Century". Musica Disciplina. 58: 51–71. JSTOR 24429413.
