= Guillaume Du Fay =

Composer of the Renaissance (1397–1474)

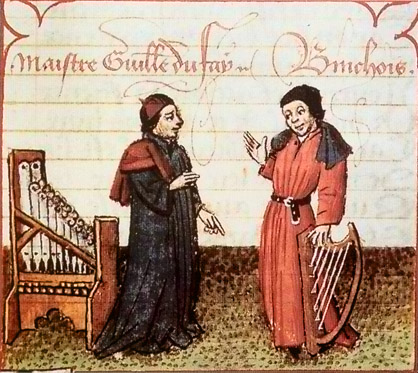
Du Fay (left) beside a portative organ, with Gilles Binchois (right) holding a small harp in a miniature from before 1451. See § Portraits

Guillaume Du Fay (/djuːˈfaɪ/ dyoo-FEYE, French: [ɡijom dy fa(j)i]; also Dufay, Du Fayt; 5 August 1397 – 27 November 1474) was a composer and music theorist of early Renaissance music, who is variously described as French or Franco-Flemish. Considered the leading European composer of his time, his music was widely performed and reproduced. Du Fay was well-associated with composers of the Burgundian School, particularly his colleague Gilles Binchois, but was never a regular member of the Burgundian chapel himself.

While he is among the best-documented composers of his time, Du Fay's birth and family are shrouded with uncertainty, though he was probably the illegitimate child of a priest. He was educated at Cambrai Cathedral, where his teachers included Nicolas Grenon and Richard Loqueville. For the next decade, Du Fay worked throughout Europe: as a subdeacon in Cambrai, under Carlo I Malatesta in Rimini, for the House of Malatesta in Pesaro, and under Louis Aleman in Bologna, where he was ordained priest. As his fame began to spread, he settled in Rome in 1428 as musician of the prestigious papal choir, first under Pope Martin V and then Pope Eugene IV, where he wrote the motets Balsamus et munda cera, Ecclesie militantis and Supremum est mortalibus. Amid Rome's financial and political disorder in the 1430s, Du Fay took a leave of absence from the choir to serve Amadeus VIII, Duke of Savoy.

Du Fay returned to Italy in 1436, writing his most admired work, the complex motet Nuper Rosarum Flores, which celebrated the consecration of Filippo Brunelleschi's dome for the Florence Cathedral. He later joined the recently moved papal court in Bologna, and was associated with the House of Este in Ferrara. For the next eleven years, Du Fay was in Cambrai serving Philip the Good, under whom he may have written now-lost works on music theory. After a brief return to both Savoy and Italy, Du Fay settled in Cambrai in 1458, where his focus shifted from song and motet, to composing English-inspired cyclic masses based on cantus firmus, such as the Missa Ave regina celorum, the Missa Ecce ancilla Domini, the Missa L'Homme armé and the Missa Se la face ay pale. During his final years in Cambrai, Du Fay wrote his now-lost requiem and both met and influenced the leading musicians of his time, including Antoine Busnois, Loyset Compère, Johannes Tinctoris and particularly, Johannes Ockeghem.

Du Fay has been described as leading the first generation of European musicians who were primarily considered 'composers' by occupation. His erratic career took him throughout Western Europe, resulting in a 'cosmopolitan style' and an extensive oeuvre which included representatives of virtually every polyphonic genre of his time. Like Binchois, Du Fay was deeply influenced by the contenance angloise style of John Dunstaple, and synthesized it with a wide variety of other styles, including that of the famous Missa Caput, and the techniques of his younger contemporaries, Ockeghem and Busnois.

== Life ==
=== Background ===
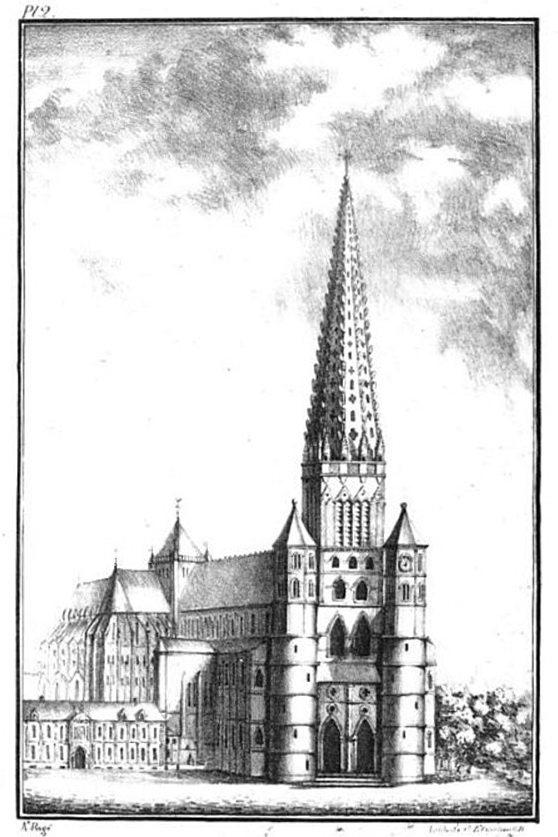
Sketch of Old Cambrai Cathedral before its destruction in the French Revolution

Du Fay's life is better documented than "almost any other [European] composer of the 15th century". The reasons for this are numerous, but especially informative are the thorough record keeping of the institutions he associated with and the many biographical or historical anecdotes integrated in his compositions. In addition, while records from many northern French cathedrals were either lost or destroyed, those from Cambrai Cathedral remain extant.

Modern scholarship generally spells the composer's surname as two words, 'Du Fay'. Before the late 20th century, however, spelling the name as single word—'Dufay'—was much more common. Archival discoveries from this period revealed that the surname was usually spelled as two words in documents of the 14th and 15th century, contrary to musical sources of that time. It seems that Du Fay's parents spelt their surname as 'Du Fayt', but for unknown reasons the composer altered the spelling while active in Italy. Documents from the composer's early years in Cambrai sometimes spelled his first name as Willaume, or a related form such as Willermus, Willem or Wilhelm.

=== Early life ===
From the evidence of his will, he was probably born in Beersel, in the vicinity of Brussels, the illegitimate child of an unknown priest and a woman named Marie Du Fayt. She moved with her son to Cambrai early in his life, staying with a relative who was a canon of the cathedral there. The link between the Du Fay family and the Cathedral of Cambrai is the sole reason a large amount of information is known about Du Fay's early life, as the institute kept detailed records on all affiliated persons. His musical gifts were noticed by the cathedral authorities, who evidently gave him a thorough training in music; he studied with Rogier de Hesdin during the summer of 1409, and he was listed as a choirboy in the cathedral from 1409 to 1412. During those years he studied with Nicolas Malin, and the authorities must have been impressed with the boy's gifts because they gave him his own copy of Villedieu's Doctrinale Puerorum in 1411, a highly unusual event for one so young. In June 1414, aged around 16, he had already been given a benefice as chaplain at St. Géry, immediately adjacent to Cambrai where he studied under Nicolas Malin and Richard Loqueville. Later that year, on the evidence of music composed, and a later relationship with the Malatesta court, members of which he met on the trip, he probably went to the Council of Konstanz. He likely stayed there until 1418, at which time he returned to Cambrai.

=== Cambrai to Italy and Savoy ===
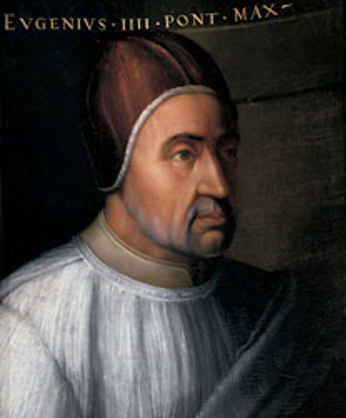
Pope Eugene IV, in a portrait by Cristofano dell'Altissimo, who employed Du Fay in the papal choir

From November 1418 to 1420 he was a subdeacon at Cambrai Cathedral. In 1420 he left Cambrai for Italy – first to Rimini and then to Pesaro, where he worked for the Malatesta family. Several of his compositions can be dated to this period; they contain colloquial references to Italy. There he met the composers Hugo and Arnold de Lantins, who were also among the musicians of the Malatesta household. In 1424 Du Fay returned to Cambrai, because of the illness and subsequent death of the relative with whom his mother was staying. By 1426, however, he had returned to Italy. In Bologna, he entered the service of Cardinal Louis Aleman, the papal legate. While in Bologna he became a deacon, and by 1428 he was ordained priest.

Cardinal Aleman was driven from Bologna by the rival Canedoli family in 1428, and Du Fay also left, going to Rome. He became a member of the Papal Choir, the most prestigious musical establishment in Europe, serving first Pope Martin V, and then after the death of Pope Martin in 1431, Pope Eugene IV. By this time his fame had spread, and he had become one of the most respected musicians in Europe. As a consequence, honors in the form of benefices came to him from churches in his homeland. In 1434 he was appointed maistre de chappelle in Savoy, where he served Duke Amédée VIII. He had left Rome because of a crisis in the finances of the papal choir while seeking to escape the turbulence and uncertainty during the struggle between the papacy and the Council of Basel. By 1435 he was again in the service of the papal chapel, but this time it was in Florence – Pope Eugene having been driven from Rome in 1434 by the establishment of an insurrectionary republic there, sympathetic to the Council of Basel and the Conciliar movement. In 1436 Du Fay composed the festive motet Nuper rosarum flores, one of his most famous compositions, dedicated to and performed at the cathedral of Santa Maria del Fiore in Florence, featuring Filippo Brunelleschi's renowned dome. Eugene at this time lived in exile at the nearby church of Santa Maria Novella.

The papal court moved to Bologna in April 1436, and by 10 May 1437 Du Fay was in possession of a university law degree. Since there is no evidence that Du Fay had studied law at Bologna, it is likely that the degree was granted by papal fiat. In September 1436, Du Fay achieved what he had long sought for, a lucrative benefice near the place of his birth. A certain Jehan Vivien went on to become the bishop of Nevers, vacating his canonicate at Cambrai in the process, and Du Fay was given Vivien's canonicate by both motu proprio and Papal bull. Although the law degree was not necessary in holding the canonicate at Cambrai, Du Fay regarded both titles important enough to be mentioned in his funeral monument.

During this period Du Fay also began his long association with the Este family in Ferrara, some of the most important musical patrons of the Renaissance, and with which he probably had become acquainted during the days of his association with the Malatesta family; Rimini and Ferrara are not only geographically close, but the two families were related by marriage, and Du Fay composed at least one ballade for Niccolò III, Marquis of Ferrara. In 1437 Du Fay visited the town. When Niccolò died in 1441, the next Marquis maintained the contact with Du Fay, and not only continued financial support for the composer but copied and distributed some of his music.

=== Return to Cambrai ===
The struggle between the papacy and the Council of Basel continued through the 1430s, and evidently Du Fay realised that his own position might be threatened by the spreading conflict, especially since Pope Eugene was deposed in 1439 by the council and replaced by Duke Amédée of Savoy himself, as Pope (Antipope) Felix V. At this time Du Fay returned to his homeland, arriving in Cambrai by December of that year. One of the first documents mentioning him in Cambrai is dated 27 December 1440, when he received a delivery of 36 lots of wine for the feast of St. John the Evangelist.

Du Fay was to remain in Cambrai through the 1440s, and during this time he was also in the service of the Duke of Burgundy. While in Cambrai he collaborated with Nicolas Grenon on a complete revision of the liturgical musical collection of the cathedral, which included writing an extensive collection of polyphonic music for services. In addition to his musical work, he was active in the general administration of the cathedral. In 1444 his mother Marie died, and was buried in the cathedral; and in 1445 Du Fay moved into the house of the previous canon, which was to remain his primary residence for the rest of his life. Planchart speculates that around this time Du Fay might have written his works on music theory, both of which are lost.

=== Travels to Savoy and Italy ===
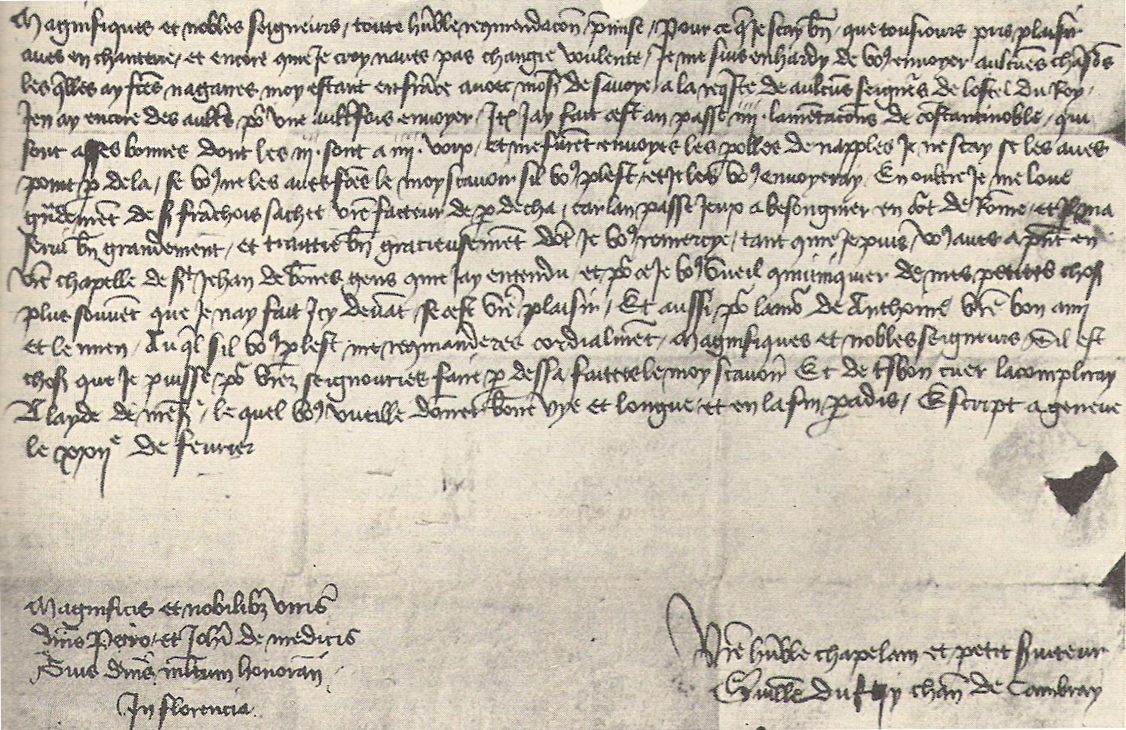
Letter from Du Fay to the Medici, 22 February 1454

After the abdication of the last antipope (Felix V) in 1449, his own former employer Duke Amédée VIII of Savoy, the struggle between different factions within the Church began to heal, and Du Fay once again left Cambrai for points south. He went to Turin in 1450, shortly before the death of Duke Amédée, but returned to Cambrai later that year; and in 1452 he went back to Savoy yet again. This time he did not return to Cambrai for six years, and during that time he attempted to find either a benefice or an employment which would allow him to stay in Italy. Numerous compositions, including one of the four Lamentationes that he composed on the Fall of Constantinople in 1453, his famous mass based on Se la face ay pale, as well as a letter to Lorenzo de' Medici, survive from this period: but as he was unable to find a satisfactory position for his retirement, he returned north in 1458. While in Savoy he served more-or-less officially as choirmaster for Louis, Duke of Savoy, but he was more likely in a ceremonial role, since the records of the chapel never mention him.

=== Final years in Cambrai ===
When he returned to Cambrai for his final years, he was appointed canon of the cathedral. He was now the most renowned composer in Europe. Once again he established close ties to the court of Burgundy, and continued to compose music for them; in addition he received many visitors, including Busnois, Ockeghem, Tinctoris, and Loyset Compère, all of whom were decisive in the development of the polyphonic style of the next generation. During this period he probably wrote his mass based on the popular "L'homme armé" tune, and he may be the author of the chanson Il sera par vous – L'homme armé, which uses the same cantus firmus; the latter composition may have been inspired by Philip the Good's call for a new crusade against the Turks, who had recently captured Constantinople. He also wrote a Requiem mass around 1460, which is lost.

After an illness of several weeks, Du Fay died on 27 November 1474. He had requested that his motet Ave regina celorum be sung for him at his deathbed, but time was insufficient for this to be arranged. Instead, his now-lost Requiem Mass was performed during his funeral service. Du Fay was buried in the chapel of St. Étienne in the cathedral of Cambrai; his portrait was carved onto his tombstone. After the destruction of the cathedral during the French Revolution the tombstone was lost, but it was found in 1859 (it was being used to cover a well), and is now in the Palais des Beaux Arts museum in Lille.

== Music ==
Du Fay composed in most of the common forms of the day, including masses, motets, Magnificats, hymns, simple chant settings in fauxbourdon, and antiphons within the area of sacred music, and rondeaux, ballades, virelais and a few other chanson types within the realm of secular music. None of his surviving music is specifically instrumental, although instruments were certainly used for some of his secular music. Seven complete Masses, 28 individual Mass movements, 15 settings of chant used in Mass propers, three Magnificats, two Benedicamus Domino settings, 15 antiphon settings (six of them Marian antiphons), 27 hymns, 22 motets (13 of these isorhythmic in the more angular, austere 14th-century style which gave way to more melodic, sensuous treble-dominated part-writing with phrases ending in the "under-third" cadence in Du Fay's youth) and 87 chansons definitely by him have survived. Of Du Fay's masses, his Missa se la face ay pale and Missa L'Homme armé are listed on AllMusic as essential compositions. Editions of Du Fay's music include:

- Guillaume Dufay, Opera omnia (collected works in six volumes), ed. Heinrich Besseler with revisions by David Fallows. Corpus mensurabilis musicae CMM 1, Rome: American Institute of Musicology, 1951–1995.
- Die frühen Messenkompositionen von Guillaume Dufay, ed. R. Bockhold, 1960, Tutzing

=== Chant settings ===
Many of Du Fay's compositions were simple settings of chant, obviously designed for liturgical use, probably as substitutes for the unadorned chant, and can be seen as chant harmonizations. Often the harmonization used a technique of parallel writing known as fauxbourdon, as in the following example, a setting of the Marian hymn Ave maris stella:

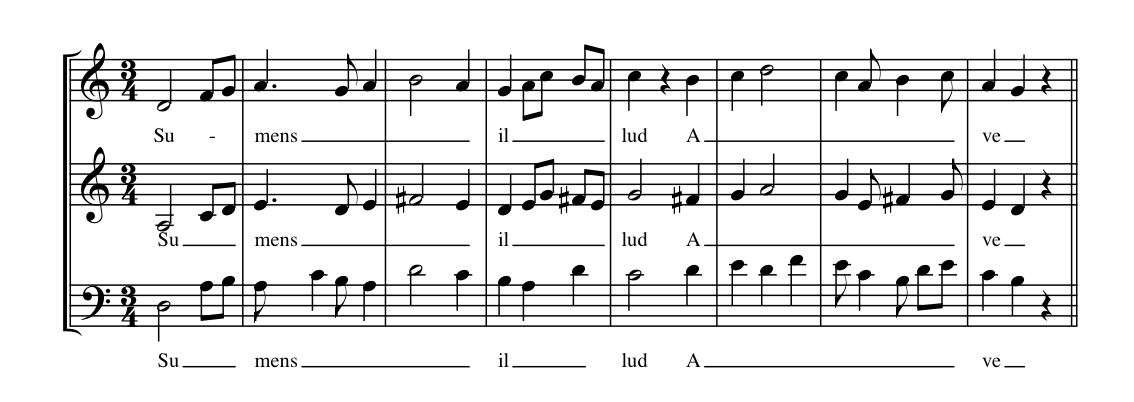
Portion of Du Fay's setting of Ave maris stella, in fauxbourdon. The top line is a paraphrase of the chant; the middle line, designated "fauxbourdon", (not written) follows the top line but exactly a perfect fourth below. The bottom line is often, but not always, a sixth below the top line; it is embellished, and reaches cadences on the octave.

Du Fay may have been the first composer to use the term "fauxbourdon" for this simpler compositional style, prominent in 15th century liturgical music in general and that of the Burgundian school in particular.

=== Secular music ===
Se la face ay pale
Hear a performance of Du Fay's celebrated ballade Se la face ay pale performed by ASTERIA

Most of Du Fay's secular songs follow the formes fixes (rondeau, ballade, and virelai), which dominated secular European music of the 14th and 15th centuries. He also wrote a handful of Italian ballate, almost certainly while he was in Italy. As is the case with his motets, many of the songs were written for specific occasions, and many are datable, thus supplying useful biographical information.

Most of his songs are for three voices, using a texture dominated by the highest voice; the other two voices, unsupplied with text, were probably played by instruments. Occasionally Du Fay used four voices, but in a number of these songs the fourth voice was supplied by a later, usually anonymous, composer. Typically he used the rondeau form when writing love songs. His latest secular songs show influence from Busnois and Ockeghem, and the rhythmic and melodic differentiation between the voices is less; as in the work of other composers of the mid-15th century, he was beginning to tend towards the smooth polyphony which was to become the predominant style fifty years later.

A typical ballade is Resvellies vous et faites chiere lye, which was written in 1423 for the marriage of Carlo Malatesta and Vittoria di Lorenzo Colonna The musical form is aabC for each stanza, with C being the refrain.

=== Theoretical writings ===
Two written works on music theory by Du Fay have been documented, but neither has survived. The first of these is known from the theorist Gaffurius, who wrote in the margins of both his Ext, uetus parvus musicae and Tractatus brevis cantus plani references to a Musica by Du Fay. The citations, however, are very brief and reveal nothing more than information which might be found in any music treatise of the period. Given the supposed unimportance of the treatise, the biographer Francesco Rocco Rossi questions why Gaffurius would even include the citations, and suggests that perhaps he was relying on the elder composer's authority. He concludes that "the chronological proximity between the two musicians leads us to consider this testimony faithful." The second derives from the nineteenth-century musicologist François-Joseph Fétis, who claimed to have seen a sixteenth-century copy of a treatise ascribed to Du Fay, entitled Tractatus de musica mensurata et de proportionibus ('A Treatise on Measured Music and Proportions'). It was last documented as having been sold to a London book dealer in 1824. The testimony from Fétis remains problematic, as nothing of it is known aside from its name, making it impossible reconstruct.

If Du Fay did indeed write these works, he would be among a large tradition of 'composer-theorists', including Johannes Ciconia, Franchinus Gaffurius and Tinctoris, among others. It is possible that these documents are the same treatise, and the references to Musica were shorthand for the work seen by Fétis. Alternatively, Rossi notes that Fétis spoke specifically of a treatise influenced by Du Fay, which may not necessarily mean he was its author. Rossi, however, contends that the works are the same, while Planchart and Laurenz Lütteken list them separately in their catalogues.

== Portraits ==
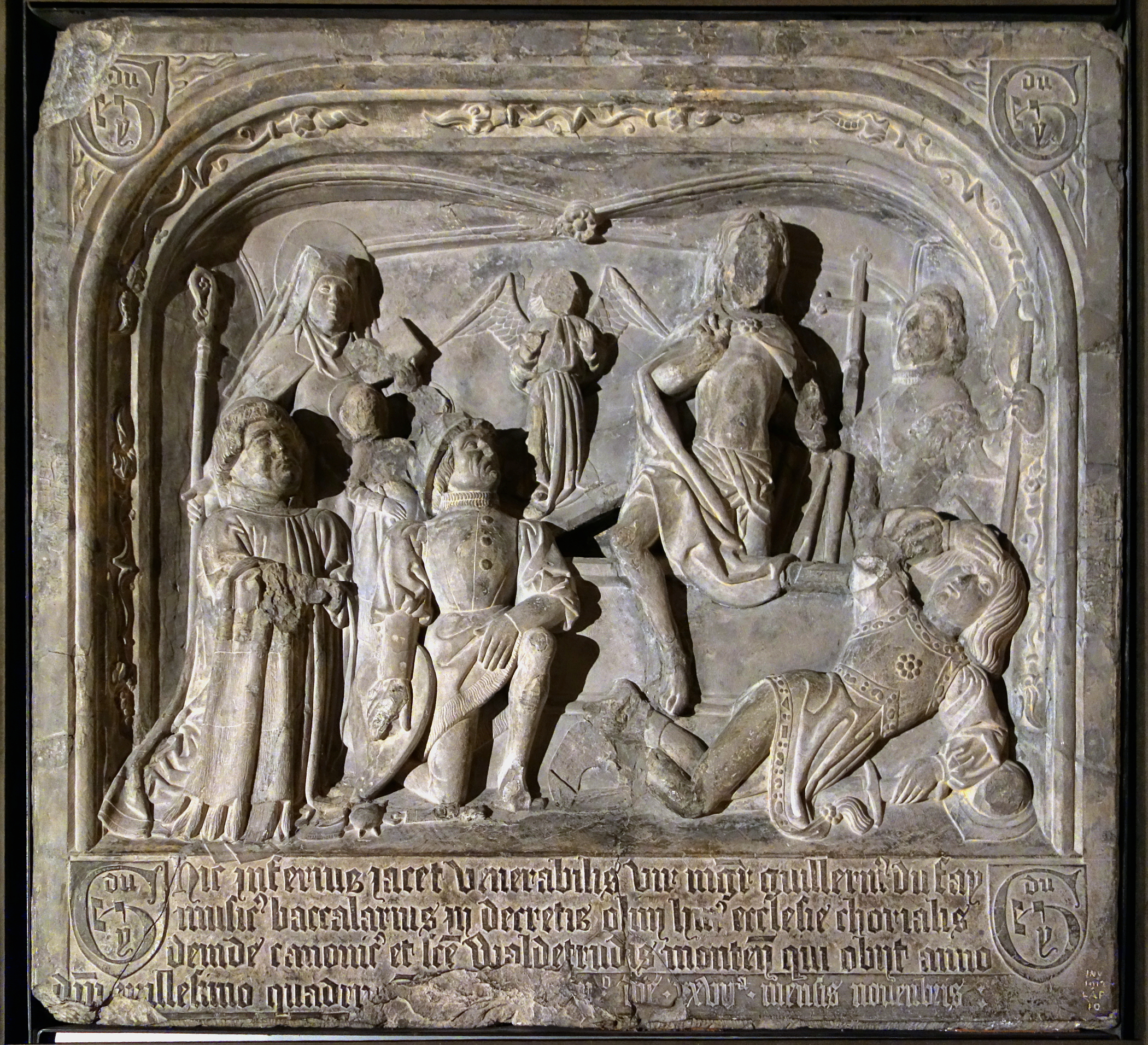
Du Fay's funeral monument; he is the kneeling figure at the left

Two known depictions of Du Fay survive from his lifetime, both described by Planchart as "simplified likenesses", which "clearly depict the same person".

The earlier, and better known, is a miniature of him and Binchois from a manuscript of the poet Martin le Franc's Le champion des dames, dated sometime before 1451. (Note: This illustration is the only certain depiction of Binchois, though others have been proposed.) The illustration depicts Du Fay on the left beside a portative organ, with Binchois on the right holding a small harp. It is folio 98 recto of the manuscript, which is kept in Bibliothèque nationale de France (inv. 12476). In comparison to the later depiction, Fallows characterizes the miniature as "more general in its iconography". The image's illuminator is unknown, though it was likely Barthélemy Poignare, who was the manuscript's scribe. Regardless of the illuminator's identity, the artist probably knew Du Fay personally, as their work has been identified in other manuscripts originating in Cambrai.

The other is a carving on Du Fay's funeral monument where he is kneeling in the bottom left corner. Standing behind him is Saint Waltrude of Mons, the eponymous saint of the church in Mons where he also held a benefice. To his right, three soldiers and an angel observe the resurrected Christ. The art historian Ludovic Nys has suggested it was based on a c. 1460 woodcut from Florence, though the art historian Douglas Brine has not found this convincing.

== Legacy ==
Before Du Fay's time, the concept of a 'composer'—that is, a musician whose primary occupation is composition—was largely unfamiliar in Europe. The emergence of musicians who focused on composition above other musical endeavors arose in the 15th century, and was exemplified by Du Fay.

Due to their mutual importance, Du Fay and Binchois have been grouped together since their lifetimes. The musicologist Reinhard Strohm considers this misleading, noting that while Binchois "earned his enormous reputation in the one genre in which he excelled as a composer, performer and possibly even poet, Du Fay's creativity unfolded along many more musical lines". He furthers that Du Fay's oeuvre is "more diversified than that of any composer since Machaut".

Du Fay was one of the last composers to make use of late-medieval polyphonic structural techniques such as isorhythm, and one of the first to employ the more mellifluous harmonies, phrasing and melodies characteristic of the early Renaissance. His compositions within the larger genres (masses, motets and chansons) are mostly similar to each other; his renown is largely due to what was perceived as his perfect control of the forms in which he worked, as well as his gift for memorable and singable melody. During the 15th century he was universally regarded as the greatest composer of his time, an opinion that has largely survived to the present day.

Du Fay is the namesake of the Dufay Collective, an early music ensemble of historically informed performances.

== Editions ==
- Haberl, Franz Xaver (1885–1888). Bausteine für Musikgeschichte [Building Blocks for Music History]. Leipzig: Breitkopf & Härtel. OCLC 9572903.
- Stainer, John Frederick Randall; Stainer, Cecie, eds. (1898). Dufay and his Contemporaries: Fifty Compositions (Ranging from about A.D. 1400 to 1440). Introduction by Edward Nicholson; musical analysis by John Stainer (1 ed.). London: Novello & Co. OCLC 1120811734. Archive.org
  - Stainer, John Frederick Randall; Stainer, Cecie, eds. (1963). Dufay and his Contemporaries: Fifty Compositions (Ranging from about A.D. 1400 to 1440). Introduction by Edward Nicholson; musical analysis by John Stainer (2 ed.). Amsterdam: Frits A.M. Knuf. OCLC 21452928.
- Besseler, Heinrich (1932). Guillaume Dufay: zwölf geistliche und weltliche Lieder [Guillaume Dufay: Twelve Sacred and Secular Songs]. Das Chorwerk. Vol. 19. Wolfenbüttel: G. Kallmeyer Verlag. OCLC 1240177.
- Gerber, Rudolf (1937). Guillaume Dufay: Sämtliche Hymnen [Guillaume Dufay: Complete Hymns]. Das Chorwerk. Vol. 49. Wolfenbüttel: Möseler Verlag. OCLC 917168.
- Van, Guillaume de (1947–1949). Guglielmi Dufay: Opera Omnia. Corpus mensurabilis musicae. Rome: American Institute of Musicology. OCLC 2998172.
  - I: Motetti qui et cantiones vocantur (1947)
  - II: Motetti isorithmici dicti (1948)
  - III: Missa sine nomine (1949)
  - IV: Missa Sancti Jacobi (1949)
