= Isorhythm =

Musical technique using a repeating pattern

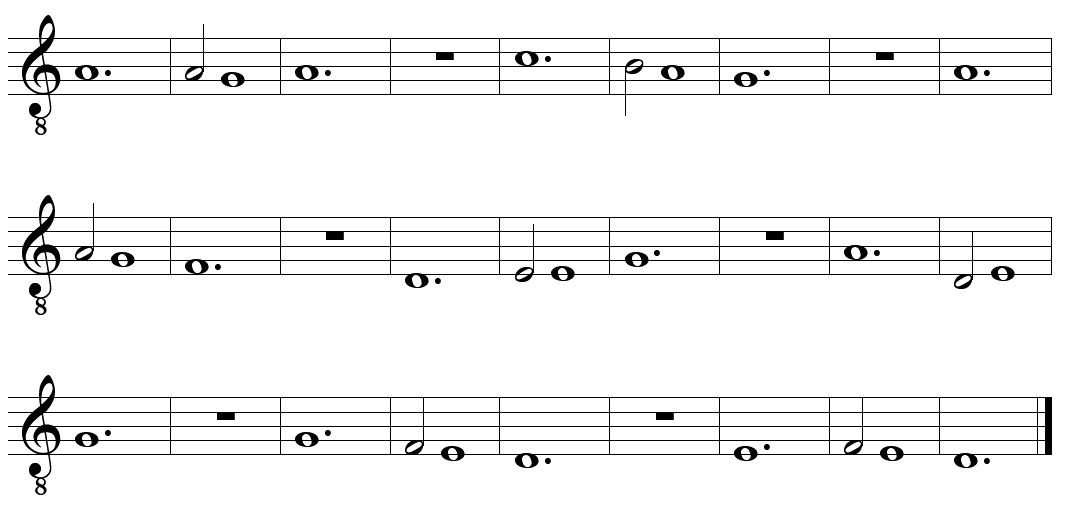
Transcription in modern notation of the isorhythmic tenor voice from the opening of the Kyrie of Guillaume de Machaut's Messe de Nostre Dame (c. 1360). A color of 28 pitches is arranged with a talea of four durations which repeats seven times (28 ÷ 4 = 7).

Isorhythm (from the Greek for "the same rhythm") is a musical technique using a repeating rhythmic pattern, called a talea, in at least one voice part throughout a composition. Taleae are typically applied to one or more melodic patterns of pitches or colores, which may be of the same or a different length from the talea.

== History and development ==
=== 13th and 14th centuries ===
Isorhythms first appear in French motets of the 13th century, such as in the Montpellier Codex. Although 14th-century theorists used the words talea and color—the latter in a variety of senses related to repetition and embellishment—the term isorhythm was coined in 1904 by musicologist Friedrich Ludwig, initially to describe the practice in 13th-century polyphony. Ludwig later extended its use to the 14th-century music of Guillaume de Machaut. Subsequently, Heinrich Besseler and other musicologists expanded its scope further as an organizing structural element in 14th- and early 15th-century compositions—in particular, motets. Some of the earliest works organized around isorhythms are early 14th-century motets by various composers in an illuminated manuscript of the Roman de Fauvel. Two of the era's most important composers of isorhythmic motets are Phillipe de Vitry and Guillaume de Machaut. Machaut's second motet, De souspirant / Tous corps qui de bien amer / Suspiro, is an example of typical 14th-century use of isorhythm.

Isorhythm is a logical outgrowth of the rhythmic modes that governed most late medieval polyphony. Discarding modal-rhythmic limitations, isorhythm became a significant organizing principle of much of 14th-century French polyphony by extending the talea of an initial section to the entire composition in conjunction with variation of a corresponding color. "The playful complexity of ...[taleae] that mixes mensuration and undergoes diminution by half—became a typical, even a defining feature of motets in the 14th century and beyond".

==== An example ====
Structural diagram of the isorhythmic tenor in Johannes Alanus' Sub arturo plebs / Fons citharizantium / In omnem terram

The structural diagram above shows the isorhythmic tenor voice of a late 14th-century motet, Sub arturo plebs / Fons citharizantium / In omnem terram by Johannes Alanus (c. late 14th century), featuring threefold isorhythmic diminution.

- Staff 1: preexisting Gregorian cantus firmus melody, from the first antiphon for the first nocturn of the commons for Apostles, In omnem terram exivit sonus eorum ('their voice has gone out into all the world'). The cantus firmus of the motet is a perfect fifth higher than the original chant; notes used for the tenor marked in red.
- Staff 2: isorhythmic tenor as notated in mensural notation. Numbers 1–3 and brackets indicate three rhythmically identical sequences (taleae). The three mensuration signs in the beginning define the pattern of diminution, indicating tempus perfectum cum prolatione maiore, tempus perfectum cum prolatione minore and tempus imperfectum cum prolatione minore, respectively. (In the manuscript these signs are in fact found at the end of the line, together with a repetition sign.)
- Staves 3–5: abbreviated transcription into modern notation. Each line represents one full repetition of the tenor's melody (color), including the three taleae in each, resulting in a nine-part structure. (Within each color, only the first few notes of each talea are rendered here.) The three mensuration signs in the line above correspond to the change in time signatures: 9/8, 6/8, 4/8.

=== Later ===
During the decades following and into the 15th century, upper voices became increasingly involved in isorhythmic organization. Many compositions became isorhythmic in all voices, a practice known as panisorhythm. In such compositions, the length of the color and talea are often unequal, causing the repetition of the melody in differing rhythmic patterns. As an example, if the "color" includes nine notes and the "talea" five, the "color" would have to be repeated five times before the two schemes again realign. Examples can be found in motets and Mass movements by John Dunstable, Johannes Ciconia and Guillaume Du Fay.

A 15th-century mass by a composer known only as Pycard found in the Old Hall manuscript (named for the English town in which it was eventually discovered), demonstrates the high sophistication and complexity of panisorhythmic techniques. The lower parts have a recurring color and talea that unite the composition. The upper parts have four different talea, one for each major section of the composition. The rhythmic relationship between upper and lower parts changes as the music progresses. Each quarter note in the lower part equals 4 1/2 quarter notes in the upper parts, creating an uneven ratio of 4:9 that causes the parts to lose synchronization. The lower part then steadily contracts in a series of Pythagorean proportions (12:9:8:6) until the parts come back into alignment.

=== Other cultures ===
As an analytical concept, isorhythm has proven valuable for understanding musical practices in other cultures; for example, the Peyote culture songs of certain North American Indian groups and the music of India and Africa.

== See also ==
- Isometer
