= Graphic notation (music) =

Type of representation of music

Graphic notation (or graphic score) is the representation of music through the use of visual symbols outside the realm of traditional music notation. Graphic notation became popular in the 1950s, and can be used either in combination with or instead of traditional music notation. Graphic notation was influenced by contemporary visual art trends in its conception, bringing stylistic components from modern art into music. Composers often rely on graphic notation in experimental music, where standard musical notation can be ineffective. Other uses include pieces where an aleatoric or undetermined effect is desired. One of the earliest pioneers of this technique was Earle Brown, who, along with John Cage, sought to liberate performers from the constraints of notation and make them active participants in the creation of the music.

== Characteristics ==
Graphic notation is characterized by its variability and lack of standardization. According to Baker's Student Encyclopedia of Music, Vol. 1, "Graphic notation is used to indicate extremely precise (or intentionally imprecise) pitch or to stimulate musical behavior or actions in performance." Modern graphic notation relies heavily on the imagination and inspiration of each individual performer to interpret the visual content provided by the composer. Because of this relative freedom, the realization of graphically notated pieces usually varies from performance to performance. For example, in notation indication "E" of his piece Concert for Piano and Orchestra, John Cage writes: "Play with hands indicated. Where clefs differ, a note is either bass or treble", an indeterminacy which is not unusual in Cage's work, and which leaves decision-making up to the performer. Some graphic scores can be defined as action-based, where musical gestures are notated as shapes instead of conventional musical ideas.

The use of graphic notation within a score can vary widely, from the score being made up entirely of graphic notation to graphic notation being a small part of an otherwise largely-traditional score. Some composers include written explanations to aid the performer in interpreting the graphic notation, while other composers opt to leave the interpretation entirely up to the performer. Graphic notation is difficult to characterize with specificity, as the notation system is only limited by the imagination and ability of the composer. Though some composers, like John Cage, formulate graphic notation systems which unify the approach of specific pieces, or several pieces, there is no universal consensus on the parameters of graphic notation and its use.

== History ==
=== Early history ===
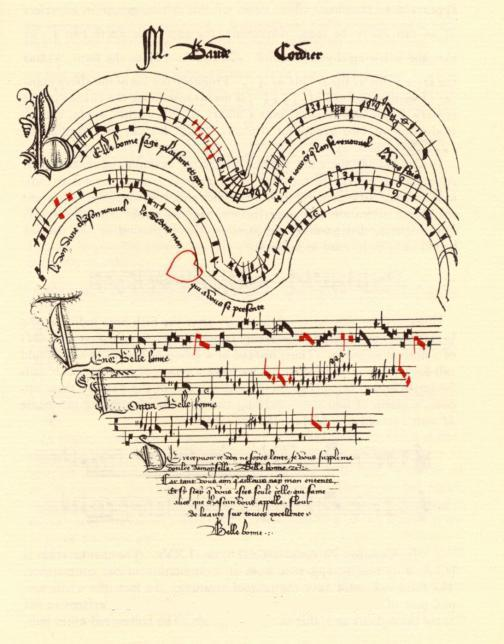
Belle, bonne, sage, by Baude Cordier, fl. 15th century.

Though its most popular usage occurred in the mid-twentieth century, the first evidence of graphic notation dates back much earlier. Originally called "eye music", these graphic scores bear much resemblance to the scores of composers like George Crumb. One of the earliest surviving pieces of eye music is Belle, Bonne, Sage by Baude Cordier, a Renaissance composer. His score, formed in the shape of a heart, was intended to enhance the meaning of the chanson. Characteristic of the Ars subtilior, "experimentations with mensural signs and graphic shapes and colours were often a feature of musical design – for the sake of visual, rather than necessarily audible effect." Another example of eye music from the ars subtilior is Jacob Senleches' La harpe de melodie, where the voices are notated on a stave that appears to be the strings of a harp. Eye music's popularity died down after the Humanist movement of the mid-16th century, later to be revitalized in the twentieth century as the use of graphic scores became prominent once again.

The 19th century music educator Pierre Galin developed a method of notating music known as the Galin-Paris-Chevé system, building on a notation system created in the 18th century by Jean-Jacques Rousseau. This system used numbers to indicate scale degrees, and used dots either above or below the note to indicate if they were in the lowest octave or the highest. The middle octave, relative to the example, contained no dots. Flats and sharps were notated using backslashes and forward slashes respectively. Prolongations of the note were notated using periods, and silence was notated with the number zero. This method was primarily used to teach sight-singing. The usage of symbols to indicate musical direction have been likened to an early version of graphic notation.

=== Uses in the twentieth century ===
Experimental music appeared in the United States and Europe during the 1950s, when many of the once untouchable parameters of traditional music began to be challenged. Aleatoric music, indeterminate music, musique concrète and electronic music shook previously unquestioned concepts, such as musical time or the function of the musician, and dared to add others to musical space in all its dimensions, with all their ontological consequences and burdens. They also changed the roles of the composer, the performer and the public, giving them totally new functions to explore.

In this context, the score, which had to a great extent been considered a mere support for musical writing (with the exception of eye music), began to flirt with the limits of the work and its identity. This marriage produced three paths: the first considered the musical score to be a representation of organized sound; the second conceived it as an extension of sound; and the third viewed it as another type of music, a visual music with its own autonomy, independent of sound. The score took on new meanings and went from being a mere support of sound to being an extension of the work, or even another work altogether, an element that was as important as the sounds and silences it contained, or more. These conceptions required a new language and a new reading of what it is to be musical. They also required a new notation, one that would reflect the changes taking place in the second artistic vanguards, and contain them, granting them a new semantics. In this way, taken with the porousness of experimental music with respect to the plastic arts, notation came to be more and more influenced by a dialogue with painting, installations and performativity. As J.Y. Bosseur mentions in La musique du XXè siècle à la croisé des artes, the score progressed towards representing the management of space, a graphic space that allows us to know the multiple connections enclosed within it.

Graphic notation in its modern form first appeared in the 1950s as a tool for avant-garde composers to integrate Indeterminacy, chance, and a broader range of musical and non-musical sounds into their music. The earliest (Western) graphic score is Feldman's "Projection 1" from 1950. This movement was also pioneered by John Cage in conversation with a group of composers, including Morton Feldman, Earle Brown, and Christian Wolff, now known as the New York School (distinct from the New York School painters). Pianist David Tudor, a virtuosic and serious pianist able to realize the new notational forms in a compelling manner, was an important figure as well. Graphic notation was originally used by avant-garde musicians and manifested itself as the use of symbols to convey information that could not be rendered with traditional notation such as extended techniques. Graphic scores have, since their conception, evolved into two broadly defined categories, one being the invention of new notation systems used to convey specific musical techniques and the other the use of conceptual notation such as shapes, drawings and other artistic techniques that are meant to evoke improvisation from the performer. Examples of the former include Morton Feldman's Projection 1, which was the result of Feldman drawing abstract shapes on graph paper, and Stockhausen's Prozession. Examples of the latter include Earle Brown's December 1952 and Cornelius Cardew's Treatise, which was written in response to Cage's 4'33" and which he wrote after having worked as Stockhausen's assistant. The score consists of 193 pages of lines and shapes on a white background. Here the lines represented elements in space and the score was merely a representation of that space at a given instant. In Europe, one of the most notable users was Sylvano Bussotti, whose scores have often been displayed as pieces of visual art by enthusiasts. In 1969, in an effort to promote the movement of abstract notation, John Cage and Allison Knowles published an archive of excerpts of scores by 269 composers with the intention of showing "the many directions in which notation is now going".

Other notable pioneers of graphic notation include composers such as Roman Haubenstock-Ramati, Mauricio Kagel, György Ligeti (Artikulation), Krzysztof Penderecki, Karlheinz Stockhausen, and Iannis Xenakis, Morton Feldman, Constance Cochnower Virtue, and Christian Wolff. The post-World War II proliferation of graphic notation, among a broad array of new forms of experimental notation, was an important catalyst for interdisciplinary exploration across the arts, spawning many innovations across music, art, poetry and dance.

=== Twenty-first-century advancements ===
In 2008, Theresa Sauer edited a compendium featuring graphic scores by composers from over fifty countries, demonstrating how widespread the practice has become.

Since emerging in the 1950s, graphic notation has undergone significant development. Today, it is used not only in modern ensemble music but also in therapeutic contexts , and educational environments. Moreover, graphic scores promote collaboration among musicians from diverse backgrounds—including classical, folk, amateur, and jazz/pop traditions—by offering a common visual medium that enhances the accessibility and inclusiveness of contemporary music creation.

Due in part to technological advancements and the rapid exchange of information, alternative forms of musical notation have become increasingly widespread. Since the late 20th century, many composers have experimented with Animated Music Notation (AMN)—a digital approach that introduces movement and visual dynamics as integral features of the musical score.

== Examples ==
=== As a notational system ===
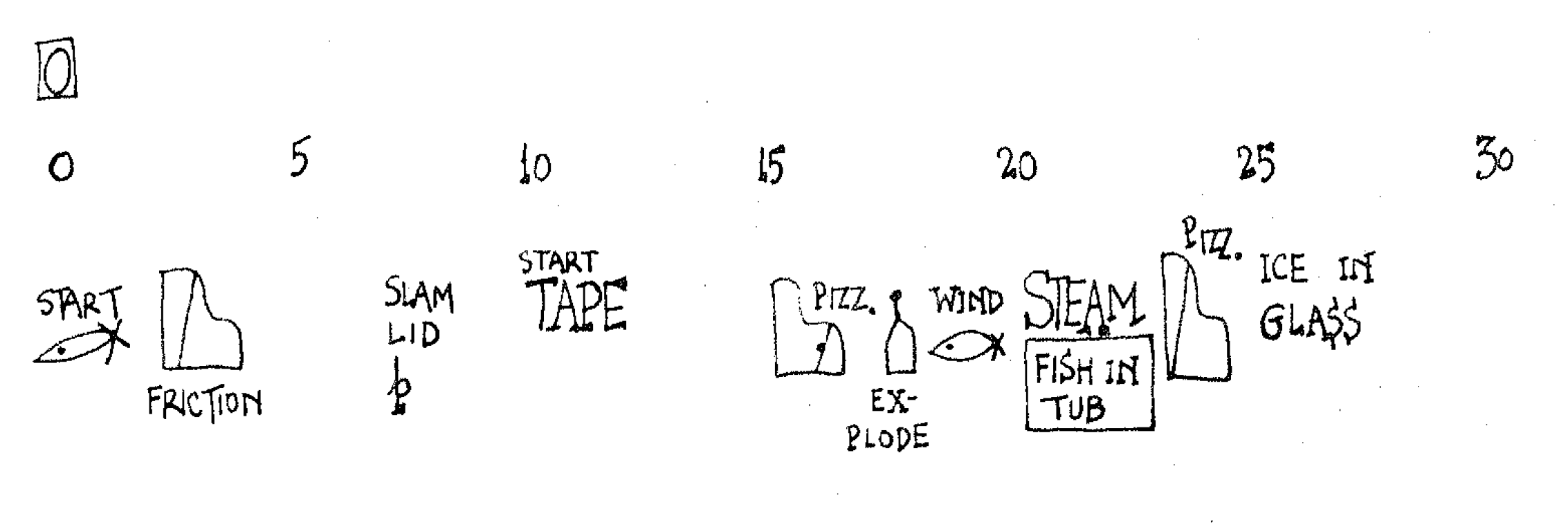
Section of Waterwalk by John Cage

- Time-based pictographic scores such as Waterwalk by John Cage, uses a combination of time marking a pictographic notation as instruction on how and when to perform certain actions.
- Pictographic scores such as Stripsody by Cathy Berberian use only drawings and text, foregoing any sort of time reference. This allows the performer to interpret the piece as they like.
- Line staves showing approximate pitch, with the actual pitches being decided upon performance.

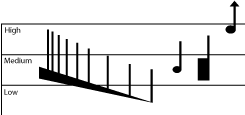

- Altered notation can be seen in George Crumb's work, where he uses traditional notation but presents the music on the page in a graphic or nontraditional manner such as spirals or circles. One example of altered notation is Crumb's Makrokosmos" for Amplified Piano. Crumb's score contained three detailed pages of instructions, with movements including Primeval Sounds, Crucifixus and Spiral Galaxy.
- New specific notation system, that is, a new of specifically and graphically notate musical actions like that of Xenakis' Psappha.

=== As abstract visual reference ===
- Time-based abstract representation, can be seen in Hans-Christoph Steiner's score for Solitude in which the music is represented using symbols and illustrations. Note that here, time is still represented horizontally from left to right like in a pitch graph system, and thus implies that the piece has a specific form.
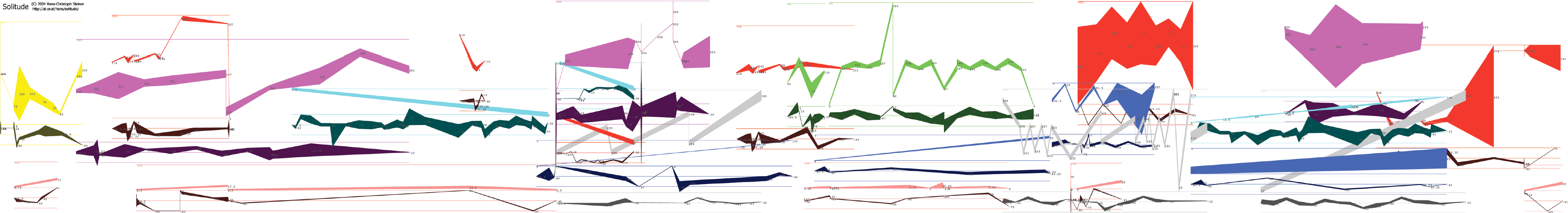
  Hans-Christoph Steiner's score for Solitude, created using Pure Data's data structures
- Time-based abstract notation, such as Rudolf Komorous's Chanson utilizes abstract notation with time indication, or least a direction in which the piece is read and therefore implies a form.
- Free abstract representations, such as Brown's December 1952, where the form, pitch material and instrumentation are left up to the performer.
- Another example is John Cage's Aria; although it may appear to be random squiggles, each line indicates a different style of singing, notated in wavy lines in ten different colors, and the black squares indicate non-specified 'non-musical' sounds.
- Free abstract notation, such as Mark Applebaum's "The Metaphysics of Notation" and where elements of traditional music notation are melded with abstract designs.
- Another example is Tom Phillips' Golden Flower Piece, this piece uses uppercase letters to show notes that should be played in the bass, and lowercase letters played in a higher register. The player is allowed to add flats and sharps as they please. The dots around the notes show how loud the note should be played, and how long it should be held for.

== Other notable users ==
Notable practitioners of graphic notation not mentioned previously include:

- Carmen Barradas
- Dennis Báthory-Kitsz
- Cathy Berberian
- Luciano Berio
- John Bergamo
- Anthony Braxton
- André Boucourechliev
- Leo Brouwer
- Herbert Brün
- Randolph Coleman
- Henry Cowell
- Emily Doolittle
- Toby Driver
- Iancu Dumitrescu
- Brian Eno
- Eric Ewazen
- Morton Feldman
- Jerry Goldsmith
- Michail Goleminov
- Jonny Greenwood
- Milan Grygar
- Barry Guy
- Lou Harrison
- Alfred Harth
- Cat Hope
- Panayiotis Kokoras
- Andrzej Krzanowski
- Bruno Liberda
- Helmut Lachenmann
- Yuri Landman
- Anestis Logothetis
- Raymond MacDonald
- Vlastislav Matoušek
- Robert Moran
- Luigi Morleo
- Conlon Nancarrow
- Pauline Oliveros
- Roberto Paci Dalò
- Krzysztof Penderecki
- Norbert Walter Peters
- Deborah Pritchard
- Sylvano Bussotti
- Emanuel Dimas de Melo Pimenta
- Randy Raine-Reusch
- Rival Consoles
- Bernard Rands
- Roger Reynolds
- Matana Roberts
- Marina Rosenfeld
- Sven-David Sandström
- Leon Schidlowsky
- R. Murray Schafer
- Netty Simons
- Stuart Saunders Smith
- Wadada Leo Smith
- Juan María Solare
- Allen Strange
- Shiori Usui
- Michael Vetter
- Claude Vivier
- Jennifer Walshe
- Sabrina Peña Young
- John Zorn

== See also ==
- Oramics
