= Dietrich Kämper =

German musicologist

Dietrich Kämper (born 1936) is a German musicologist.

== Life ==
Born in Melle, Niedersachsen, Kämper studied at the University of Cologne and University of Zurich with research stays in Bologna, Florence and Rome. He received his doctorate in 1963 with a dissertation Franz Wüllner – Leben, Wirken und kompositorisches Schaffen at the University of Cologne, where he habilitated in musicology in 1967. Since 1986 he was the holder of the newly established chair for musicology at the Hochschule für Musik und Tanz Köln. In 1995 he was finally appointed to the University of Cologne. His main areas of research were Renaissance music, music of the 20th century and music history of the Rhineland.

== Musicological author ==
- Franz Wüllner, Arno-Volk-Verlag, Cologne 1963
- Studien zur instrumentalen Ensemblemusik des 16. Jahrhunderts in Italien, Böhlau Verlag, Vienna / Cologne 1970
- Gefangenschaft und Freiheit – Leben und Werk des Komponisten Luigi Dallapiccola, Gitarre-und-Laute-Verlagsgesellschaft, Cologne 1984
- Die Klaviersonate nach Beethoven, Wissenschaftliche Buchgesellschaft, Darmstadt 1987

== Musicological editor ==
- Richard Strauss und Franz Wüllner im Briefwechsel, Arno-Volk-Verlag, Köln 1963
- Max-Bruch-Studien – Zum 50. Todestag des Komponisten, Arno-Volk-Verlag, Cologne 1970
- Rheinische Musiker – Folge 7, Merseburger Verlag, Kassel 1972
- Rheinische Musiker – Folge 8, Merseburger Verlag, Kassel 1974
- Rheinische Musiker – Folge 9, Merseburger Verlag, Kassel 1981
- Frank Martin, das kompositorische Werk – 13 Studien, Bericht über das Internationale Frank-Martin-Symposium, 18 until 20 Oktober 1990 in Köln-Brauweiler, Schott Music, Mainz 1993
- Der musikalische Futurismus, Laaber-Verlag, Laaber 1999
- Alte Musik und Aufführungspraxis – Festschrift for Dieter Gutknecht zum 65. Geburtstag, Lit Verlag, Münster / Berlin / Vienna / Zürich 2007
- Max Bruch und Philipp Spitta im Briefwechsel, Merseburger Verlag, Kassel 2013

== Festschriften for his birthday ==
- Musik – Kultur – Gesellschaft. Interdisziplinäre Aspekte aus der Musikgeschichte des Rheinlandes; Dietrich Kämper zum 60. Geburtstag, edited by the Arbeitsgemeinschaft für rheinische Musikgeschichte, Norbert Jers, Merseburger-Verlag, Kassel 1996
- Aspetti musicali – musikhistorische Dimensionen Italiens 1600 bis 2000; Festschrift für Dietrich Kämper zum 65. Geburtstag, edited by Norbert Bolin, Verlag Dohr, Cologne 2001
