= Eye music =

Music score with unusual graphical features

Eye music (often referred to in English by its exact German translation Augenmusik) describes graphical features of scores which when performed are unnoticeable by the listener.

== Difficulties in defining eye music ==
By simple definition eye music is when the graphic notation of music is altered in some meaningful way visible to the performers. Often the changed "meaning" of the altered notation is enhanced by the music having compositional elements of melody and form such as word painting and canon. Moreover, the concept is demonstrated by sometimes differing perceptions of composer, performer, and listener.

=== Eye music and puzzle-solving ===
The difficulty in definition is also apparent with border-line cryptographic contrapuntal works such as puzzle canons, which appear in the score entirely as a bare line of notes with clefs, rests, time signatures, key signatures or brief cryptic clues in Latin to reveal multiple lines of music in canons of diminution, augmentation, etc. (Closer to true cryptographic works would be those with soggetto cavato, where letters are embedded in the work using their solfège names.) As an example, a puzzle canon might be notated as one line of music with two key signatures and clefs, where the worked-out result will be a two-voice canon with one voice the retrograde (reverse) of the other. In itself the score with the clues alone is not eye music. But represent the same work "graphically spelled out," however, say with a drawing of the clued score facing a mirror, and the score/drawing becomes eye music.

The type of puzzle canon is also a factor. A four-voiced circular canon, when notated as a puzzle canon, may remain an un-worked-out single line of notes, and be inadmissible as eye music. When that single line of notes is inscribed in a graphical shape it becomes eye music, even if the contrapuntal puzzle remains unsolved.

An even finer use of graphical conceit is when the canon does not have any musical way to end, and are in a sense "infinite"—classically referred to as canon perpetuus, more commonly as "circular canons," and even more commonly as "rounds." When an infinite (circular) canon is inscribed in a circle, and the circle itself is a clue that means "play me as a round," a different type of eye music entails.

=== Eye music for the performer ===
Another class of eye music is when the score is purposely made difficult for the performer. For example, in Benedetto Marcello's cantata Stravaganze d’amore, the continuo part is written entirely in enharmonic chords, that is, "puns" of chord indications spelled with no regard to the key of the rest of the ensemble, but (in equal temperament) indistinguishable audibly from those spelled in the appropriate way. Here, the perverse spelling (whether humorous or annoying to the trained continuo player) is not unusual graphically, but represents a score writing unmotivated except as an inside joke between composer and performer, and is unhearable by the listener.

The Gulliver Suite by Telemann discussed below, shows a combination of three eye music features. The score is made difficult "unnecessarily," is eye-catching for its graphics, and has a clever external reference, all unnoticeable by the listener.

== The Renaissance ==
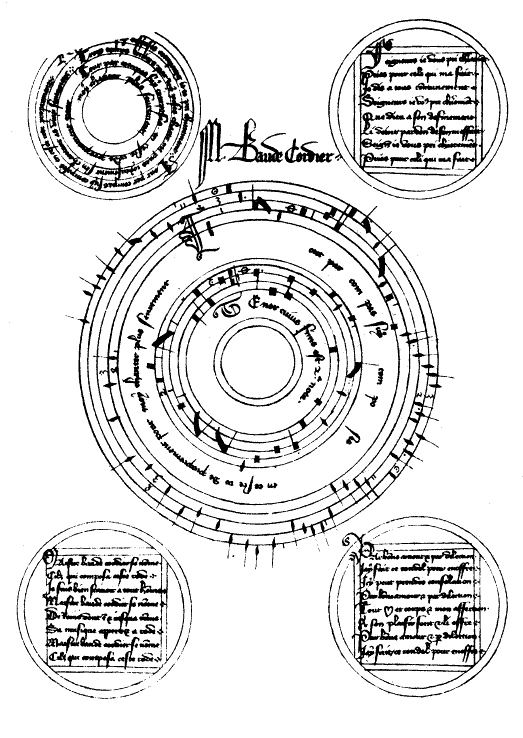
Baude Cordier's Tout par compas suy composés.

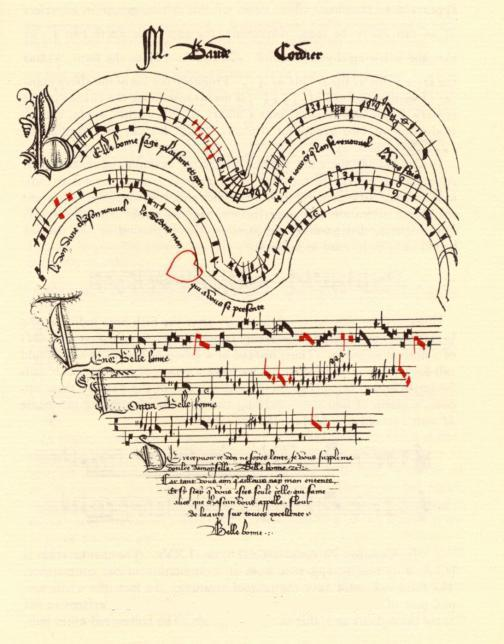
Cordier's Belle, bonne, sage with a red notation heart of notes within the larger heart.

Two examples of eye music from the early Renaissance are from Baude Cordier (ca. 1380-ca.1440). Cordier's chanson about love Belle, bonne, sage is in a heart shape, with red notes (coloration) indicating rhythmic alterations. Eye-music-within-eye music is in the small group of notes hanging like a locket in the upper left, also all in red and in the shape of a heart. Another work of Cordier, this time inscribed in circles, Tout par compas suy composés ("With a compass was I composed"), goes out of its way to identify itself as eye music.

Josquin des Prez, the most important composer of the next generation, used black note notation eye music in his well-known Nymphes des bois, a lament over the death of the composer Ockeghem, as well as another lament, this time for the composer Jacob Obrecht, Absolve, quaesumus, Domine.

It can be seen that words of death and lament are associated with black notes, a mannerism made even simpler to achieve in light of the contemporaneous simplification to white note notation. This feature of eye music would extend through the Humanist period.

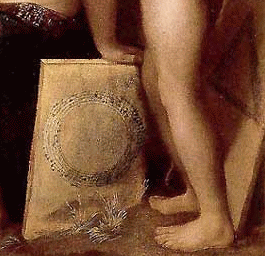
A detail from Dosso Dossi's Allegory of Music with an anonymous canon notated in a circle and a canon by Josquin notated in a triangle. (The notes of the triangular canon can be seen on the original painting under raking light, and of course this a representation of eye music, not a performer's score.)

Another instance of eye music in the Renaissance is apparently unique—the representation of a triangle for a canonic piece, which appears in juxtaposition with an anonymous canon written in a circle—in Dosso Dossi's Allegory of Music. (It has been suggested that both the technique of canon itself as well as its representation—the circle and the inherent symbolism of the tenets of Christianity in the triangle—also imply a "sense of the infinite.") The work represented in the triangle, is part of a "rough" version of a puzzle canon in Josquin's Agnus Dei II from his Missa L'homme armé super voces musicales canonic mass. It has the superscript "trinitas in un[um]" ("three in one") as a clue to its solution, is a mensuration canon of 3:1, and has one voice take part at the interval of a fifth, that is, 3:2. Its relation to the Christian Holy Trinity is clear, suggesting the use of a triangular representation. The representation is unique, although possibly from a copy used by Dossi.

== Humanism ==
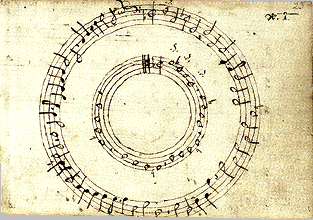
John Bull's 6-part circular canon Sphera mundi. (From an 18th-century MS.)

With the significant shift of style of composers of the Humanist movement—the rediscovery and translation of Greek texts in the mid-16th century—eye music flourished. The change in musical practice, particularly with the madrigalists and their focus on text declamation, at a word-by-word basis, was fertile ground for eye music. Words that suggest "blackness," such as "death" or "night," receive "black" notes (e.g. quarter notes, eighth notes); "white words" such as "light" or "pale" receive "white" notes (e.g. whole notes, half notes).

With the Italian madrigalists from the 1580s until the early 17th century (whose style was almost literally imported to England), eye music reached its apogee until its transformation in the 20th century. Alfred Einstein, a groundbreaking scholar of the Humanist madrigal, considered Luca Marenzio the composer most fond of eye music. For example, in the madrigal Senza il mia sole from his Madrigali a quattro, cinque e sei voci (1588), black notes are used for "chiuser le luci" ("close their eyes")

Reaction by theorists of the time was mixed. A leading musical humanist, Vincenzo Galilei (the father of Galileo), was opposed to it but Zarlino approved. In the 20th century, Alfred Einstein wrote that eye music is "the most extreme and (for our aesthetic convictions) most horrible testimony of naturalism, of imitazione, in the madrigal."

== Baroque ==
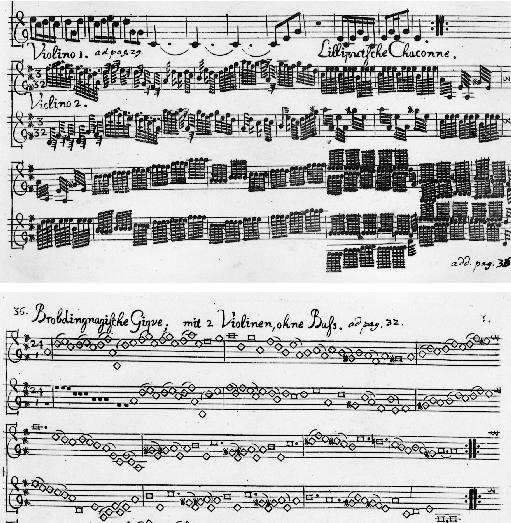
The notes for scampering Lilliputians and ponderous Brobdingnag in Telemann's Gulliver Suite. and

In Telemann's Gulliver Suite for two violins the note values in the chaconne are "Lilliputian", and, in the gigue, are "Brobdingnagian" ones. Because the Lilliputian movement is written in the bizarre time signature of 3/32, and the Brobdingnagian one in the equally obtuse 24/1 (which is doubly humorous because gigues are generally light and brisk), the time signatures reduce to 3/4 and 12/8, perfectly normal ones for each movement, as are the tempos associated with them and the type of dance of each.

== 20th century ==
Post-tonal music has seen an expansion of eye music in line with its expansion and experimentalism of musical techniques. The last examples using a rigorous scoring system rooted in standard practice are the finely turned circles and spirals (as well as a peace symbol and a crucifix) in the works of George Crumb.

=== Graphic notation ===
The beauties of many examples of graphic notation are not, in fact, a feature of eye music. As novel and attractive as the graphics may be in these scores, they function entirely as performance indications or true records of compositional method (such as the Steiner score shown here). Also often seen are graphical or conceptual art works that use the symbols of music notation but are not performing scores at all, such as Erwin Schulhoff's 1919 In futurum (Zeitmaß-zeitlos) and Cornelius Cardew's Treatise.

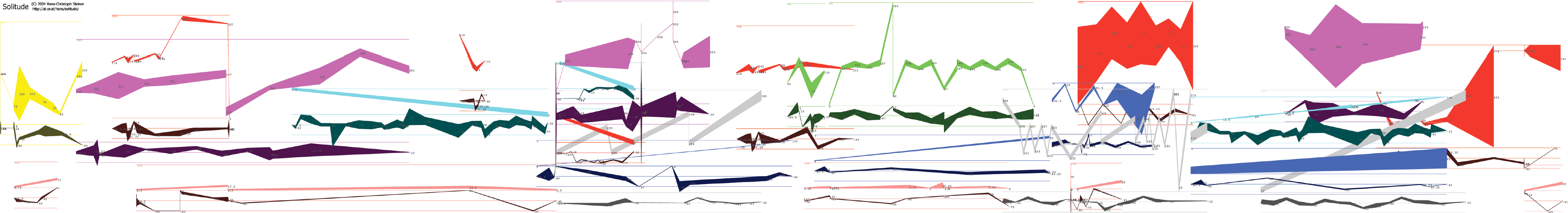
Hans-Christoph Steiner's score for Solitude, created using Pure Data's data structures.

== See also ==
- Concrete poetry
- Steganography
- Graphic notation (music)
