= Morleo =

Morleo is an Italian surname with debated etymological origins. Notable people with the surname include:

- Archimede Morleo (born 1983), Italian footballer
- Luigi Morleo (born 1970), Italian percussionist and composer
