= Canon on a Russian Popular Tune =

1965 orchestral work by Igor Stravinsky

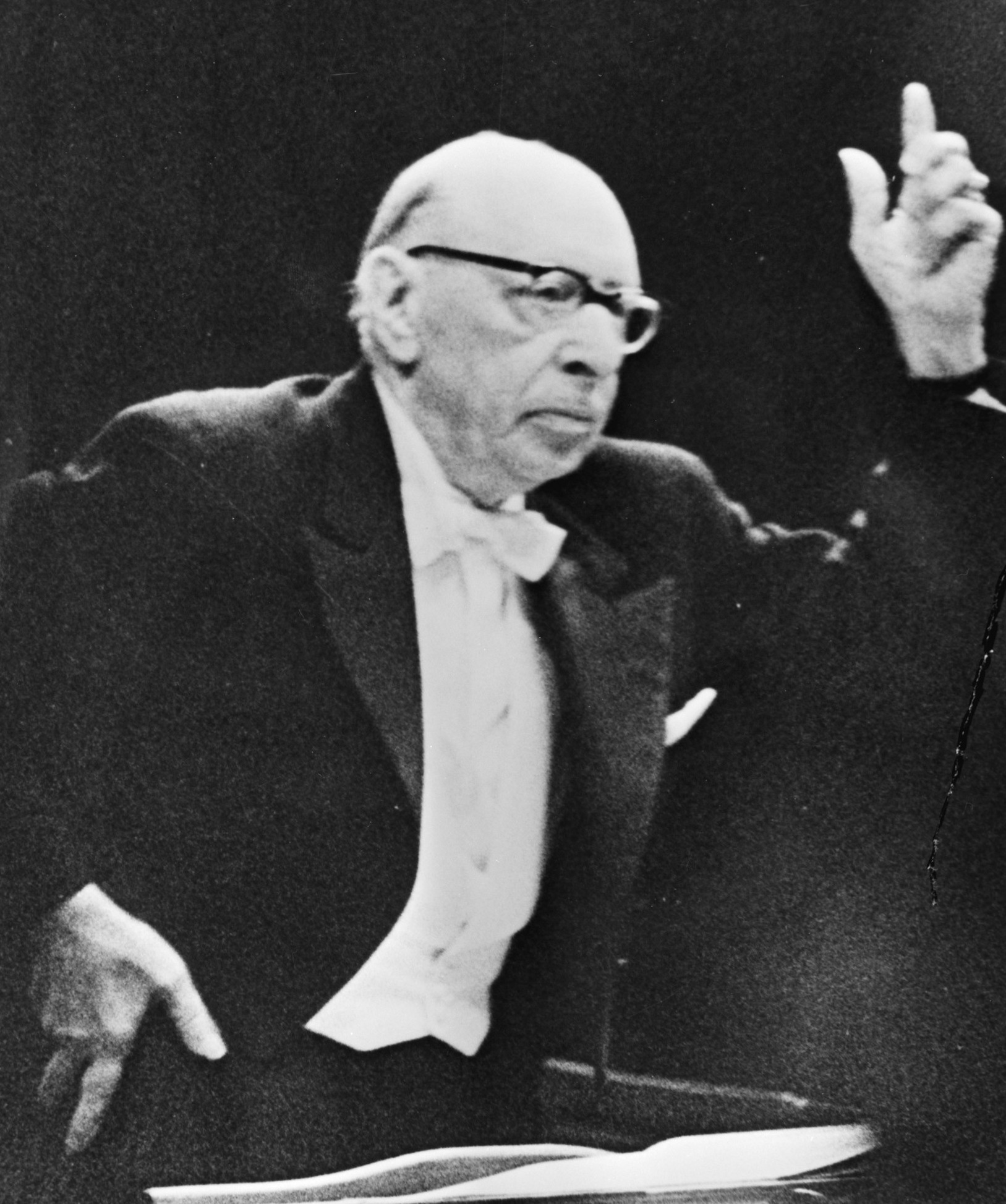
Stravinsky conducting in 1965

The "Canon on a Russian Popular Tune" (or "Canon for Concert Introduction or Encore") is an orchestral work by Igor Stravinsky composed in 1965. It is the composer's final completed score for orchestra and was composed in the summer of 1965 during work on his Requiem Canticles. Although originally intended as a valedictory tribute to Pierre Monteux, the published score makes no mention of this.

The work is an elaborate canon based on the "Coronation Scene" theme from his ballet The Firebird, which was composed 55 years earlier, and is scored for an ensemble nearly identical to the 1919 suite extracted from that ballet. Lasting less than a minute and consisting of only 35 bars, the work repeats the canon twice, with a quarter note break in between. Stravinsky submitted the finished score to Boosey & Hawkes on November 8, 1965, and it was premiered by the Toronto Symphony Orchestra under the direction of Robert Craft on December 16.

== Notes ==
Sources

- Jers, Norbert (October–December 1975). "Feuervogel—Bearbeitung aus anderer Sicht – Strawinskys 'Canon on a Russian Popular Theme'". Die Musikforschung. 28 (4): 432–434. JSTOR 41117820.
- Walsh, Stephen (2006). Stravinsky: The Second Exile (France and America, 1934–1971). New York City: Alfred A. Knopf. ISBN 0-375-40752-9.
