= Baude Cordier =

French composer (fl. early 15th century)

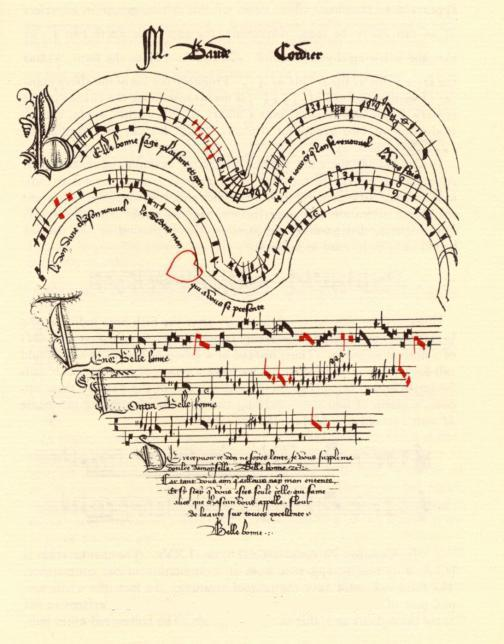
Cordier's rondeau about love, Belle, Bonne, Sage, is in a heart shape, with red notes indicating rhythmic alterations.

Baude Cordier (fl. early 15th century) was a French composer in the ars subtilior style of late medieval music. Virtually nothing is known of Cordier's life, aside from an inscription on one of his works which indicates he was born in Rheims and had a Master of Arts. Some scholars identify him with Baude Fresnel, a harpist and organist in the court of Philip the Bold, though other scholars have rejected this.

He is best known for his unique and experimental notational methods, often with shapes relating to the subject matter. These include a heart-shaped staff in Belle, Bonne, Sage, a rondeau about love, and numerous circles in the Tout par compas suy composés rondeau. Such an approach is thought to have inspired later composers, ranging from Gilles Binchois to Karlheinz Stockhausen.

== Identity ==
It has been suggested that Cordier was the pen name of Baude Fresnel.

== Music ==
External audio
- Tout par compas in a manuscript animation performed by Fortune Obscure

Cordier's works are considered among the prime examples of ars subtilior. In line with that cultural trend, he was fond of using red note notation, also known as coloration, a technique stemming from the general practice of mensural notation. The change in color adjusts the rhythm of a particular note from its usual form. (This musical style and type of notation has also been termed "mannerism" and "mannered notation.")

Ten of Cordier's secular pieces survive, most of which are rondeaux:

- some are in the rhythmically complex late fourteenth-century French style of ars subtilior, such as "Amans amés secretement" (Lovers, love discreetly).
- others are simpler, with greater emphasis on lyrical melody, such as "Belle, Bonne, Sage", also transcribed in HAM, and characterized with "Amans" as a rondeau.

Two of the composer's chansons are in the Chantilly Manuscript and are well-known examples of eye music:

- the love song "Belle, Bonne, Sage" ("Beautiful, Good, Wise"). The manuscript is in the shape of a heart.

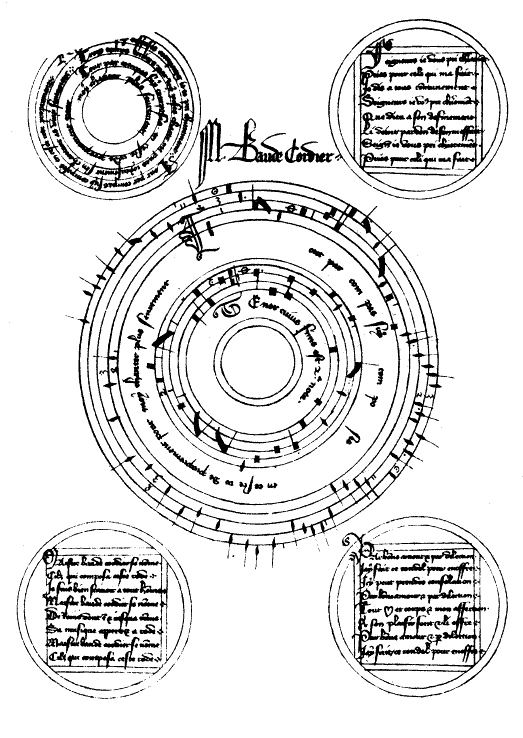
Cordier's Tout par compas suy composés.

- a circular canon "Tout par compas suy composés" ("With a compass was I composed")—more eye music, in which the manuscript is written in a circle.

Many commentators have speculated that Cordier's unique and experimental notation inspired certain notation by later composers, such that in as Refrain by Karlheinz Stockhausen, and Gilles Binchois's Je ne pouroye. Cordier's work was among the earliest Western compositions to include performance instructions to explain how to use the specialized notation.

His mass movement in the Apt MS is in the later, simpler fifteenth-century style.

== Works ==
List of compositions by Baude Cordier
Title	No. of voices	Genre	Manuscript source: Folios (Note: "v" and "r" stand for verso and recto respectively; in left-right language books, verso is the front page while recto is the back page.)	Reaney
Gloria	3	Mass movement		R 11
Dame excellent ou sont bonté	4	Ballade		R 10
Amans, amés secretement	3	Rondeau		R 6
Belle, bonne, sage, plaisant	3	Rondeau		R 8
Ce jour de l'an que maint	3	Rondeau		R 1
Je suy celuy qui veul	3	Rondeau		R 3
Pour le deffault du noble dieu Bachus	3	Rondeau		R 2
Que vaut avoir qui ne vit	3	Rondeau		R 4
Se cuer d'amant par soy	3	Rondeau		R 7
Tant ay de plaisir et de desplaisance	3	Rondeau		R 5 (Note: Also reprinted in Strohm 2005, p. 142)
Tout par compas suy composés	3	Rondeau		R 9
No other works by Baude Cordier survive

=== Editions ===
Cordier's works are included in the following collections:

- Reaney, Gilbert, ed. (1955). Early Fifteenth-Century Music. Corpus mensurabilis musicae 11. Vol. 1, Works of Baude Cordier, Johannis Cesaris, Johannis Carmen, Johannis Tapissier. Cambridge: American Institute of Musicology. OCLC 83198152.

== See also ==
- Eye music

== Sources ==
Books

- Hoppin, Richard (1978). Medieval Music. The Norton Introduction to Music History (1st ed.). New York, New York: W. W. Norton & Company. ISBN 978-0-393-09090-1.
- Strohm, Reinhard (2005) [1993]. The Rise of European Music, 1380-1500. Cambridge: Cambridge University Press. ISBN 978-0-521-61934-9.

Journals and articles

- Bergeron, Katherine (2001). "Baude de Rains". Grove Music Online. Oxford: Oxford University Press. doi:10.1093/gmo/9781561592630.article.02341. ISBN 978-1-56159-263-0. (subscription, Wikilibrary access, or UK public library membership required)
- Bergsagel, John (December 1972). "Cordier's Circular Canon". The Musical Times. 113 (1558): 1175–1177. doi:10.2307/956587. JSTOR 956587.
- Fallows, David (2001a). "Binchois [Binchoys], Gilles de Bins [Binch, Binche] dit". Grove Music Online. Oxford: Oxford University Press. doi:10.1093/gmo/9781561592630.article.03094. ISBN 978-1-56159-263-0. (subscription, Wikilibrary access, or UK public library membership required)
- Fallows, David (2001b). "Tempo and expression marks". Grove Music Online. Oxford: Oxford University Press. doi:10.1093/gmo/9781561592630.article.27650. ISBN 978-1-56159-263-0. (subscription, Wikilibrary access, or UK public library membership required)
- Günther, Ursula (1984). "Unusual Phenomena in the Transmission of Late 14th Century Polyphonic Music". Musica Disciplina. 38: 87–118. JSTOR 20532271.
- Reaney, Gilbert (2001). "Cordier, Baude". Grove Music Online. Oxford: Oxford University Press. doi:10.1093/gmo/9781561592630.article.06474. ISBN 978-1-56159-263-0. (subscription, Wikilibrary access, or UK public library membership required)
- Toop, Richard (2001). "Stockhausen, Karlheinz". Grove Music Online. Oxford: Oxford University Press. doi:10.1093/gmo/9781561592630.article.26808. ISBN 978-1-56159-263-0. (subscription, Wikilibrary access, or UK public library membership required)
- Wright, Craig (April 1973). "Tapissier and Cordier: New Documents and Conjectures". The Musical Quarterly. 59 (2): 177–189. doi:10.1093/mq/LIX.2.177. JSTOR 741520.
- "Fresnal, Baude". Grove Music Online. Oxford: Oxford University Press. 2001. doi:10.1093/gmo/9781561592630.article.10222. ISBN 978-1-56159-263-0. (subscription, Wikilibrary access, or UK public library membership required)
