= Prosdocimus de Beldemandis =

Prosdocimus de Beldemandis (or Prosdocimo de' Beldomandi) (died 1428) was an Italian mathematician, music theorist, and physician.

He studied at the University of Padua and the University of Bologna. The earliest works by him date from the early 15th century (dated 1408–9 in the manuscript Florence, Biblioteca Medicea Laurenziana, Ashburnham 206). He took the doctorate in arts at Padua on 15 May 1409, and received a physician's license on 15 April 1411. In 1412 he stayed in Montagnana, where he wrote a number of treatises. From c. 1420/22 to 1428, the year of his death, Prosdocimus taught a wide variety of subjects at Padua. His was interested in, among other things, arithmetic, music, astronomy, and astrology; this range of interests, however, was common for a Paduan doctor of his day. He wrote the last significant treatise on the art of musical notation as practiced by the Italians. He was held in high regard long after his death: some of the non-musical treatises were reprinted in the 16th century, and Luca Pacioli ranked him alongside Euclid and Boethius.

He was among the last music theorists to advocate for the Italian system of rhythmic notation (in the Tractatus pratice cantus mensurabilis ad modum Ytalicorum of 1412) and argued against Johannes Ciconia's division of the tone into twelve equal parts.

== Selected writings ==
=== On Music ===
- Expositiones tractatus pratice cantus mensurabilis Johannis de Muris (c. 1404)
- Tractatus pratice cantus mensurabilis (1408)
- Brevis summula proportionum quantum ad musicam pertinet (1409)
- Contrapunctus (1412), edited by Jan Herlinger, 1984
- Tractatus pratice cantus mensurabilis ad modum Ytalicorum (1412)
- Tractatus plane musice (1412), edited by Jan Herlinger, 2008
- Parvus tractatulus de modo monacordum dividendi (1413), edited by Jan Herlinger
- Tractatus musice speculative (1425), edited by Jan Herlinger, 2008

=== Other Treatises ===
- Algorismus de integris sive pratica arismetrice de integris (1410), reprinted Federicus Delphinus ed. (Venice, 1483 and 1540).

== Bibliography ==
- Herlinger, Jan (2001). "Prosdocimus de Beldemandis". In Sadie, Stanley; Tyrrell, John (eds.). The New Grove Dictionary of Music and Musicians (2nd ed.). London: Macmillan. ISBN 978-1-56159-239-5.

== Literature ==
- Černušák Gracián: Dějiny evropské hudby; Panteon, Prag, 35-305-64; s. 60 (in Czech)
