= Philippus de Caserta =

Italian composer

Philippus de Caserta, (fl. c. 1370; also Philipoctus, Filipotto, or Filipoctus) was a medieval music theorist and composer associated with the style known as ars subtilior.

== Life and career ==
Philippus' name indicates that he came from Caserta. He is generally thought to have worked at the Papal court at Avignon in the 1370s as his ballade, Par les bons Gedeons, praises antipope Clement VII. However, it has been suggested that Philippus never left Italy, that he wrote the above ballade at Fondi near Caserta, where Clement was elected Pope, and that he worked at the francophile court of Gian Galeazzo Visconti.

== Music ==
Most of his surviving works are ballades, although a Credo was recently discovered, and a rondeau has been attributed to him. His ballade En attendant souffrir was written for Bernabò Visconti, confirmed by the presence of Visconti's motto in the upper voice. Two of Caserta's pieces, En remirant and De ma dolour, use fragments of text from chansons by the most famous composer of the century, Guillaume de Machaut. Caserta's own repute was significant enough for Johannes Ciconia to borrow portions of Caserta's ballades for his own virelai, Sus une fontayne.

Five theoretical treatises have been attributed to Caserta, with some in dispute among scholars.

== Music ==
All pieces are for three voices.

Ballades

- De ma dolour
- En attendant souffrir
- En remirant vo douce pourtraiture
- Il n'est nulz homs
- Par le grant senz
- Par les bons Gedeons

Other

- Credo
- Rondeau, Espoir dont tu m'as fayt (disputed)

== Sources ==
- Reaney, Gilbert (2001). "Caserta, Philippus de". Grove Music Online. Oxford, England: Oxford University Press. doi:10.1093/gmo/9781561592630.article.43682. ISBN 978-1-56159-263-0. (subscription, Wikilibrary access, or UK public library membership required)
