= Norbert Walter Peters =

German composer and sound artist

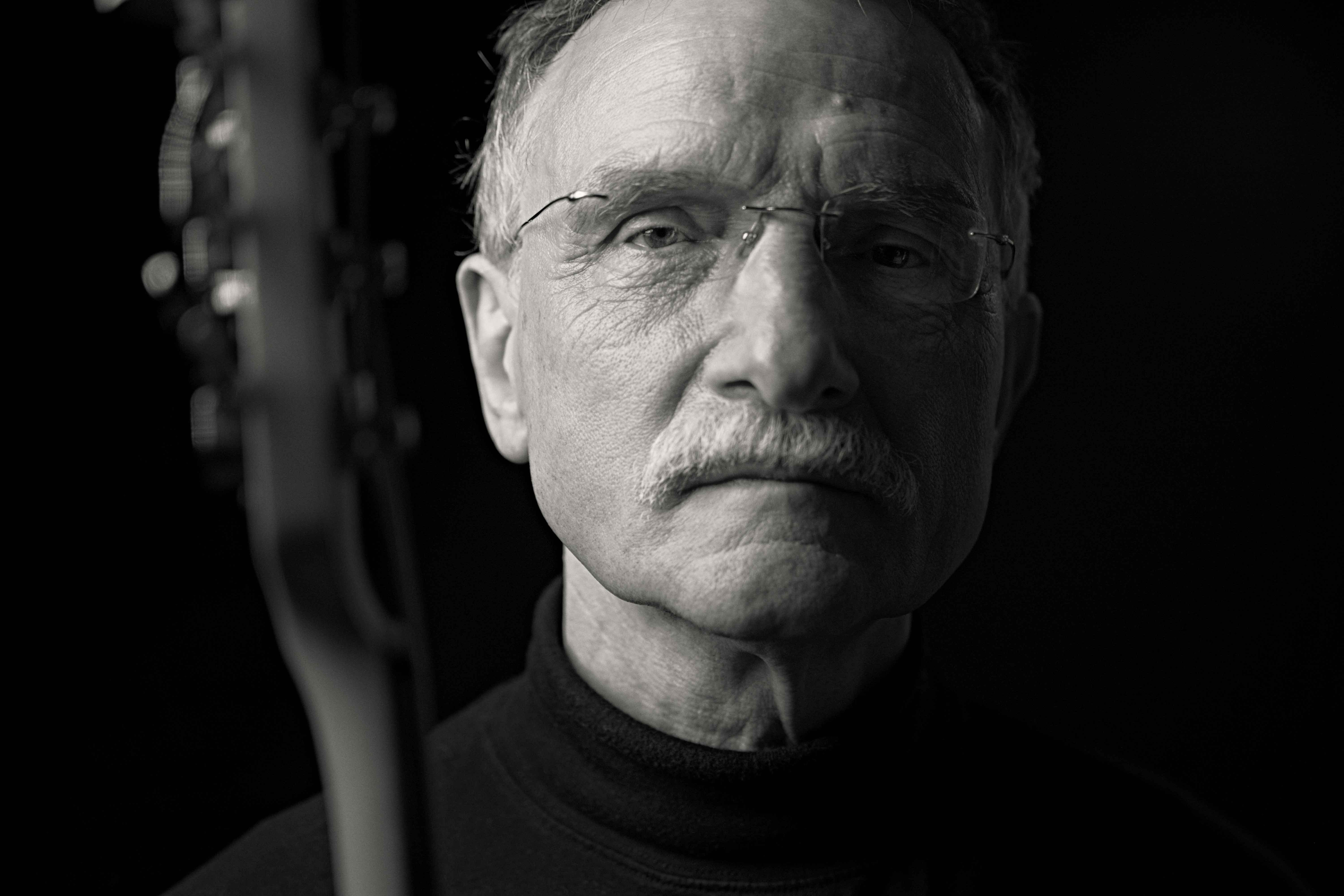
- Peters (2019)
- Born: March 17, 1954 (age 72); Stolberg, Aachen, Germany
- Occupations: Composer, sound artist and author for radio art

Norbert Walter Peters (born March 17, 1954 in Stolberg, Aachen) is a German composer, sound artist and author for Radio Art.

== Biography ==
=== Early years ===
Norbert Walter Peters finished his musical education at the Aachen academy of music in the subjects of guitar, singing and Renaissance lute in 1981. The subjectmusic theatre as well as scientific research works had been a further main point in his musical education. He completed his education with studies of composition. Beside his pedagogic and artistic work Peters was just so active as music reviewer and free journalist.

=== Career ===
Peters composed music for ensemble and made concerts as lute player until he 1987 came in contact to fine artists from the milieu of the Kunstakademie Düsseldorf. He received significant inspiration through contact and exchange with the Danish Fluxus artist Henning Christiansen and the visual US-artist and sound art pioneer Terry Fox. Peters created more and more sound performances and sound installations just as picture objects. Some pictures of him are represented in collections and in the Suermondt-Ludwig-Museum of Aachen.

Also in this time Peters organized two events with international artists: the sound art event ...KLÄNGE at the castle of Stolberg (Rhld.) and the performing arts event of the Neuer Aachener Kunstverein of Aachen. Afterwards he was guest lecturer at the Saarbrücken Academy of Fine Arts (composition and space experience). Since December 2020 he is artistic director of the successful streaming event series #coronawinter 2020/21/#klangraumFinkenberg 2021/22 / #klangraumFinkenbergZwei 2022/23 / #klangraumFinkenbergDrei 2026/27 (streaming-hybrid) on the YouTube channel Stolberg Evangelisch in the Protestant Finkenberg Church in Stolberg.

Since 1999 Peters conceived hear pieces for the Radio Arts. Norbert Walter Peters has been able to realize a number of his sound installations, radio pieces, theatreproduction and instrumental concerts by orders for composition. By radiophonic productions of the Deutschlandradio Kultur Berlin and Radio France Culture Paris.

Since about 2013 he has also been developing multimedia compositions, which he publishes as video art contributions on his YouTube channel. In addition to the video work Depot, a. o. t. Tide I - IV and other video works such as the multimedia composition # 137 belong to this complex of works.

== Works list (selection) ==
- 1988 the composed performance DIN-S18 for the first international Xerox art exhibition of Switzerland
- 1991 the acoustic Way of the Cross EKSIT for the Art Station of St. Peter's Church, Cologne
- 1991 sound performance Rond in the Basilica of St. Vitus, Mönchengladbach, D, in the context of the ENSEMBLIA-Festival, subject is the Parikrama as an aid of locomtion or standstill.
- 1999 the sound installation vasí-on for the Donaueschingen Festival of Contemporary Musica; a. o. as abstracting reflection about the use of the Fibonacci Series, the Golden Section and the number five in the Nocturne Opus 37/1, No. 11 G-minor of Frédéric Chopin
- 2000 the radio play CavæTóna (voice, percussion) for the Saarländischer Rundfunk, topic is a. o. t. the special acoustics in the cave art of the Paleolithic period and the rituals of the shamanism
- 2001 the picture object con’tinuo (presented in the Styrian autumn), this intermediary work refers a. o. t. to the circle figure S about the anima of the mediaeval philosopher und alchemist Ramon Llull
- 2005 the radio play nota.thión – after the Flood (voices, violoncello) for Radio France Culture Paris and Deutschlandradio Kultur Berlin; treats a. o. t. of the tale of the Flood in the Gilgamesh Epic from the Cuneiform script in Assyrian
- 2005/06 the radiophonic concert nota.thión – the lament of the repentant heart (flutes, voice, viola, to-play tape) for the Bayerischer Rundfunk, uses three fragments of texts of ancient oriental languages: oldEgyptian, Hurrian and Akkadian, which reflect three opinions of the Heart in the evolutionary principle of life, death and rebirth
- 2009 the radiophonic concert beau son.ge – An Electric Fayerie (voice, e-bass, e-guitar, clarinet, violoncello, slap-e-bass, percussion, to-play tape) for the Saarländischer Rundfunk, presented by the MOUVEMENT Festival for Contemporary Music Saarbruecken AMERICAN DREAMS – AMERIKANISCHE (T)RÄUME, as hommage to Jimi Hendrix
- 2010 the radio play dépôt de beau songe (voices, 5stringed e-bass con arco, noises) for Deutschlandradio Kultur Berlin, uses texts of the Passagenwerk of Walter Benjamin and works with the voices of aphasic diseased people
- 2015/20 the radio play D.A.S.H. (dash – the line) as in-house music production on the computer, Asphalt Music #1 according to grafic scores; Street Drawings of Italian migrant workers in the south of the Black Forest in Germany serve as graphic pattern, which were photographically documented by the German painter Herbert Falken in the year 2003; from 2009 to 2010 these asphalt photos were presented in the museum Kolumba of Cologne; published on his YouTube channel D.A.S.H. as part of the soundtrack to the Dance Performance Revelación of the PRISMA DANCE THEATRE (Havana/Cuba): Festival Dancing Town 2024, Monschau (D), 2024-09-15 and Festival DZM 2024, Cáceres (Spain), 2024-09-29. Live 2024-09-15, Monschau
- 2011/2019 three Ars Acustica musikproductions with the Joseph Beuys master student and visual artist Hartmut Ritzerfeld as Interpreter
- 2016/20 the experimental concert piece Kafka Is Writing Again as Asphalt Music #2 according to grafic scores is a ternary noise music for tenor trombone, double bass/bass guitar, electric guitar, percussion and prepared piano (to-play tape). The piece was performed first in the Neuer Aachener Kunstverein Live 2020-03-07
- 2022 Peppel Suite concert piece for pebble, shekere, voice. The piece was performed first for #klangraumFinkenberg
- 2023 #fantasia (The Burning Cembalo) concert piece for harpsichord. The piece was performed first for #klangraumFinkenbergZwei
- 2026 Asphalt Music #3, Part I Concert Piece by using an graphic score for prepared electric guitar (Reno Schnell), prepared bass guitar (Peter Sonntag), prepared piano (to-play tape), one dancer (Gold Mayanga Lupumbe) The piece was performed first by #klangraumFinkenbergDrei

== Award ==
- Third Price at the International Short Radio drama Competition Track 5 (2025) of the Austrian Broadcasting Corporation / ORF1
