= Diabolus in Musica (ensemble) =

Diabolus in Musica (founded Paris, 1992) is a French medieval music ensemble based in Tours and directed by Antoine Guerber. Guerber studied medieval music under Dominique Vellard at the Centre de Musique Médiévale de Paris and at the Early Music Department of the Conservatoire National Supérieur in Lyon.

== Discography ==
- 1992 - Musique en Aquitaine. Musique en Aquitaine au temps d'Aliénor (XIIe s.). Plein Jeu DMP 9105 C.
- 1994 - La Chambre des Dames. Chansons et polyphonies de trouvères (XIIe & XIIIe siècles). Studio SM D2604
- 1997 - Manuscrit de Tours. Chants de fête du XIIIe siècle. Studio SM D2672
- 1998 - Vox Sonora. Conduits de l'École de Notre-Dame. Studio SM D2673
- 1999 - La chanson de Guillaume. Lai, chansons guerrières et politiques 1188–1250. Studio SM D2756
- 1999 - Missa Magna. Messe à la chapelle papale d'Avignon, XIVe siècle. Studio SM D2819
- 2000 - Rosarius. Chants religieux en langue d'oïl (XIIIe et XIVe siècles). Studio SM D2886
- 2002 - Honi soit qui mal y pense!. Polyphonies des chapelles royales anglaises (1328-1410). Alpha 022
- 2003 - Carmina Gallica. Chansons latines du XIIe siècle. Alpha 037
- 2004 - Missa Se la face ay pale, Guillaume Dufay. Alpha 051
- 2005 - La Douce Acordance. Chansons de trouvères des XIIe et XIIIe siècles. Alpha 085
- 2006 - Paris expers Paris. École de Notre-Dame, 1170–1240. Alpha 102
- 2007 - Guillaume Du Fay: Mille Bonjours !. Alpha 116
- 2008 - La Messe de Nostre Dame, Guillaume de Machaut. Messe du XIVe siècle. Alpha 132
- 2010 - Rose tres bele. Chansons et polyphonies des dames Trouvères (XIIe et XIIIe siècles). Alpha 156
- 2011 - Historia Sancti Martini. Office de la Saint-Martin d’hiver (XIIIe siècle). Aeon 1103
- 2011 - Johannes Ciconia Opera Sacra 1 CD of 2CD box. Ricercar 316
- 2012 - Plorer, Gemir, Crier... Hommage à la Voix d'Or de Johannes Ockeghem. Aeon 1226
- 2014 - Sanctus! Les saints dans la polyphonie parisienne au XIIIe siècle. Bayard Musique 308 422
- 2015 - Œuvres sacrées de Jean Mouton. Bayard Musique 308 437
- 2018 - Requiem, Johannes Ockeghem, Pierre de La Rue. Bayard Musique 308 475.2
- 2021 - Reine du Ciel, Missa Ave Regina Celorum, Guillaume Dufay. Bayard Musique 308 611
