= Cordier =

Cordier, De Cordier is a French surname. Notable people with the surname include:

- Andrew W. Cordier (1901–1975), American administrator
- Balthasar Cordier (1592–1650), Belgian theologian
- Baude Cordier (c. 1380–before 1440), French composer
- Charles Henri Joseph Cordier (1827–1905), French sculptor
- David Cordier (born 1959), English countertenor
- Douglas Cordier (born 1953), American politician
- Henri Cordier (1849–1925), French historian, author of comments on Travels of Marco Polo
- Henri Cordier (mountaineer) (1856–1877), French mountaineer
- Jacques Cordier (c. 1580 – 1653), French dancing master and violinist
- Jean Cordier (fl. 1540s), author of Le langaige du Bresil
- John Cordier (1942–2002), Belgian businessman
- Joseph Cordier (1773–?), Acting Governor General of Pondicherry
- Louis Cordier (1777–1861), French geologist and mineralogist
- Marie-Odile Cordier (born 1950), French computer scientist
- Mathurin Cordier (1480–1564) (pen name Corderius), French pedagogue
- Michaël Cordier (born 1984), Belgian footballer
- Nicolas Cordier (1567–1612), sculptor from Lorraine working in Rome
- Noëlle Cordier (born 1944), French singer
- Patrick Cordier (alpinist)
- Patrick Cordier (mineralogist)
- Pierre Cordier (born 1933), Belgian artist
- Thierry De Cordier
