= Norbert Jers =

German musicologist

Norbert Jers (born 1947) is a German musicologist.

== Life ==
Born in Aachen, Jers completed a practical musical education in piano and choir conducting. He then studied musicology, pedagogy and archaeology at the University of Cologne. He gained his first professional experience at the WDR and the Arno Volk publishing house in Cologne. In addition, he worked as a freelancer in high schools, at the adult education centre and in the record industry and church choir direction. From 1980 to 1983 Jers was a lecturer at the Episcopal Academy of the Diocese of Aachen. This was followed by a professorship for music pedagogy at the Catholic University of Applied Sciences of North Rhine-Westphalia. From 1989 to 1993 he was head of department and dean at the Catholic University of St. Gregorius Church Music in Aachen. From 2000 to 2007 he had a teaching assignment for musicology at the same university.

Jers' musicological treatises provide the reader with a comprehensive insight into the music history of the Rhineland

== Publications ==
- Musik – Kultur – Gesellschaft. Interdisziplinäre Aspekte aus der Musikgeschichte des Rheinlands. Verlag Merseburger, Kassel
- Musikalische Regionalforschung heute – Perspektiven rheinischer Musikgeschichtsschreibung. Verlag Merseburger, Kassel
