= Ars subtilior =

Musical style of the late middle ages

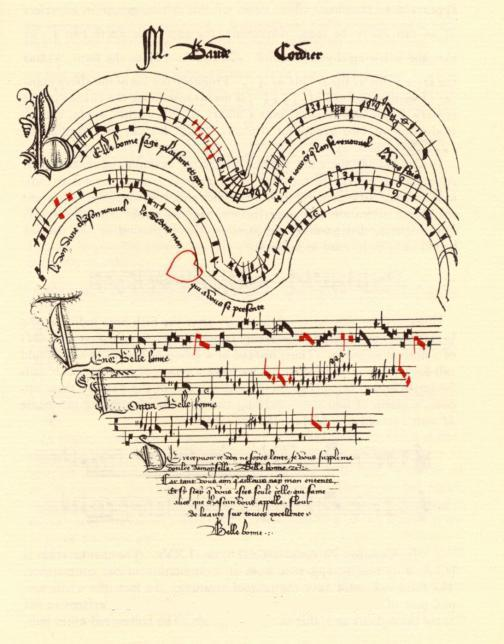
A chanson about love, Belle, bonne, sage, by Baude Cordier, is in a heart shape, with red notes indicating rhythmic alterations.

Ars subtilior (Latin for 'subtler art') is a musical style characterized by rhythmic and notational complexity, centered on Paris, Avignon in southern France, and also in northern Spain at the end of the fourteenth century. The style also is found in the French Cypriot repertory. Often the term is used in contrast with ars nova, which applies to the musical style of the preceding period from about 1310 to about 1370; though some scholars prefer to consider ars subtilior a subcategory of the earlier style. Primary sources for ars subtilior are the Chantilly Codex, the Modena Codex (Mod A M 5.24), and the Turin Manuscript (Torino J.II.9).

== Overview and history ==
Musically, the productions of the ars subtilior are highly refined, complex, and difficult to sing, and probably were produced, sung, and enjoyed by a small audience of specialists and connoisseurs. Musicologist Richard Hoppin suggests the superlative ars subtilissima, saying, "not until the twentieth century did music again reach the most subtle refinements and rhythmic complexities of the manneristic style." They are almost exclusively secular songs, and have as their subject matter love, war, chivalry, and stories from classical antiquity. There are even some songs written in praise of public figures (for example Antipope Clement VII). Daniel Albright compares avant-garde and modernist music of the 20th century's "emphasis on generating music through technical experiment" to the precedent set by the ars subtilior movement's "autonomous delight in extending the kingdom of sound." He cites Baude Cordier's perpetual canon Tout par compas (All by compass am I composed), notated on a circular staff.

Albright contrasts this motivation with "expressive urgency" and "obedience to rules of craft" and, indeed, "ars subtilior" was coined by musicologist Ursula Günther in 1960 to avoid the negative connotations of the terms manneristic style and mannered notation. (Günther's coinage was based on references in Tractatus de diversis figuris, attributed to Philippus de Caserta, to composers moving to a style "post modum subtiliorem comparantes" and developing an "artem magis subtiliter".)

One of the centers of activity of the style was Avignon at the end of their Papacy and during the subsequent Great Schism (1378–1417), the time during which the Western Church had a pope both in Rome and in Avignon. Avignon had developed into an active cultural center, and produced a significant surviving body of secular song in the late fourteenth century. The style spread into, or was simultaneously developed in northern Spain, Italy (especially Pavia) and as far east as Cyprus (which was a French cultural outpost at the time). French, Flemish, Spanish and Italian composers used the style.

== Notational characteristics ==
Manuscripts of works in the ars subtilior occasionally were themselves in unusual and expressive shapes, as a form of eye music. As well as Baude Cordier's circular canon and the heart-shaped score shown above, Jacob Senleches's La Harpe de melodie is written in the shape of a harp.

== List of composers ==
The main composers of the ars subtilior (those from whom at least three compositions in this style are known) are Anthonello de Caserta, Johannes Cuvelier, Egidius, Galiot, Matteo da Perugia, Philipoctus de Caserta, Jacob Senleches, and Trebor. Other composers associated with the style include:

- Johannes Ciconia, Sus un fontayne
- Baude Cordier, Tout par compas (Rondeau-canon) and Belle bonne sage
- Martinus Fabri
- Paolo da Firenze
- Guido de Lange, Dieux gart (Rondeau)
- Johannes Symonis Hasprois
- Matheus de Sancto Johanne
- Solage, Fumeux fume par fumée (Rondeau)
- Antonio Zacara da Teramo, Sumite karissime
- Anonymous composers at the Nicosia court of King Janus of Cyprus

== Examples ==
- Senleches: Fuions de ci
- Solage: Fumeux fume par fumee

== Sources ==
- Albright, Daniel. 2004. Modernism and Music: An Anthology of Sources. University of Chicago Press. ISBN 0-226-01267-0.
- Apel, Willi. 1973. "The Development of French Secular Music During the Fourteenth Century". Musica Disciplina 27:41–59.
- Günther, Ursula. 1960. "Die Anwendung der Diminution in der Handschrift Chantilly 1047". Archiv für Musikwissenschaft 17:1–21.
- Hoppin, Richard H. 1978. Medieval Music. New York, W.W. Norton & Co., 1978. ISBN 0-393-09090-6.
- Josephson, Nors S. 2001. "Ars Subtilior". The New Grove Dictionary of Music and Musicians, second edition, edited by Stanley Sadie and John Tyrrell. London: Macmillan Publishers.
