= La harpe de melodie =

Musical composition by Jacob Senleches

La Harpe de Melodie is a musical composition by Jacob Senleches in the ars subtilior style.

It has been transmitted via two sources. The first source dated c. 1395 is the manuscript Chicago, Newberry Library, Ms. 54.1, f. 10r (RISM siglum US-Cn 54.1, also known under the siglum Chic). In this source, the work is transmitted anonymously, i.e. the name of the composer is not given. The virelai is notated for two voices, cantus and tenor. The voices are notated on what appears to be the strings of the harp, on four "staves", the first of ten lines the other of nine lines. (That would be 37 strings, but only 22 tuning pins are depicted.) However, notes are only placed on the drawn strings or lines and not between them, forming a pseudo-tablature that is somewhat difficult to read in the first instance. A separate rondeau, explaining how to derive the canonic third voice from the cantus, is written on a banner wrapped around the fore pillar of the harp.

The second source of this composition is the famous Codex Chantilly, Chantilly, Bibliothèque du Musée Conde, ms. 564 (formerly 1047), f. 43v (RISM siglum F-Ch 564). In this source, the composition is written on regular 6-line staves and no illustration is present. The rondeau explaining how to derive the third canonic voice is present below the music.

The close interrelationship of the virelai's text, the harp illustration and the rondeau give evidence that the notation in Ch has been intended by Jacob Senleches as a synthesis of the arts.

The Newberry version of La harpe de melodie appears on the front cover of Richard Hoppin's textbook Medieval Music (Norton, 1978), a frequently used text in American universities.

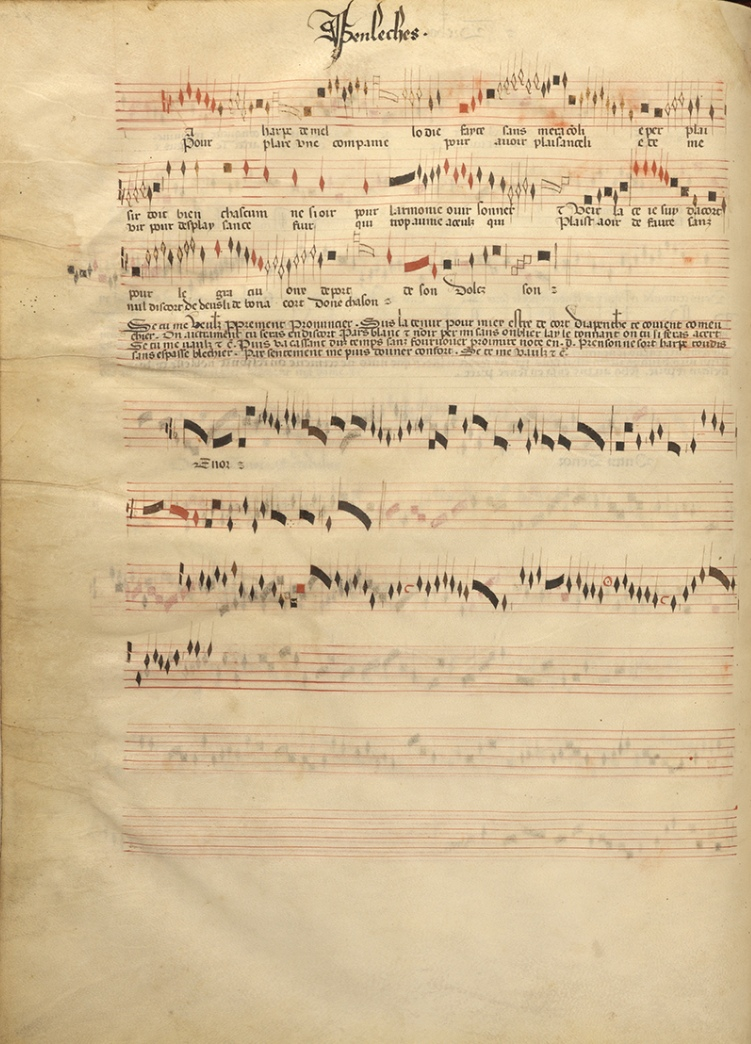
Chantilly Codex, f. 43v (in conventional notation)

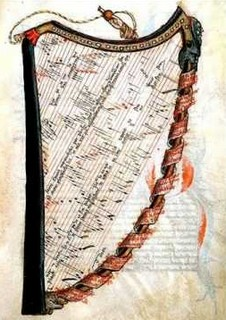
Newberry Library, Ms. 54.1, f.10r (superimposed onto the strings of a harp)
