= Johannes Ciconia =

Medieval Flemish composer (1370–1412)

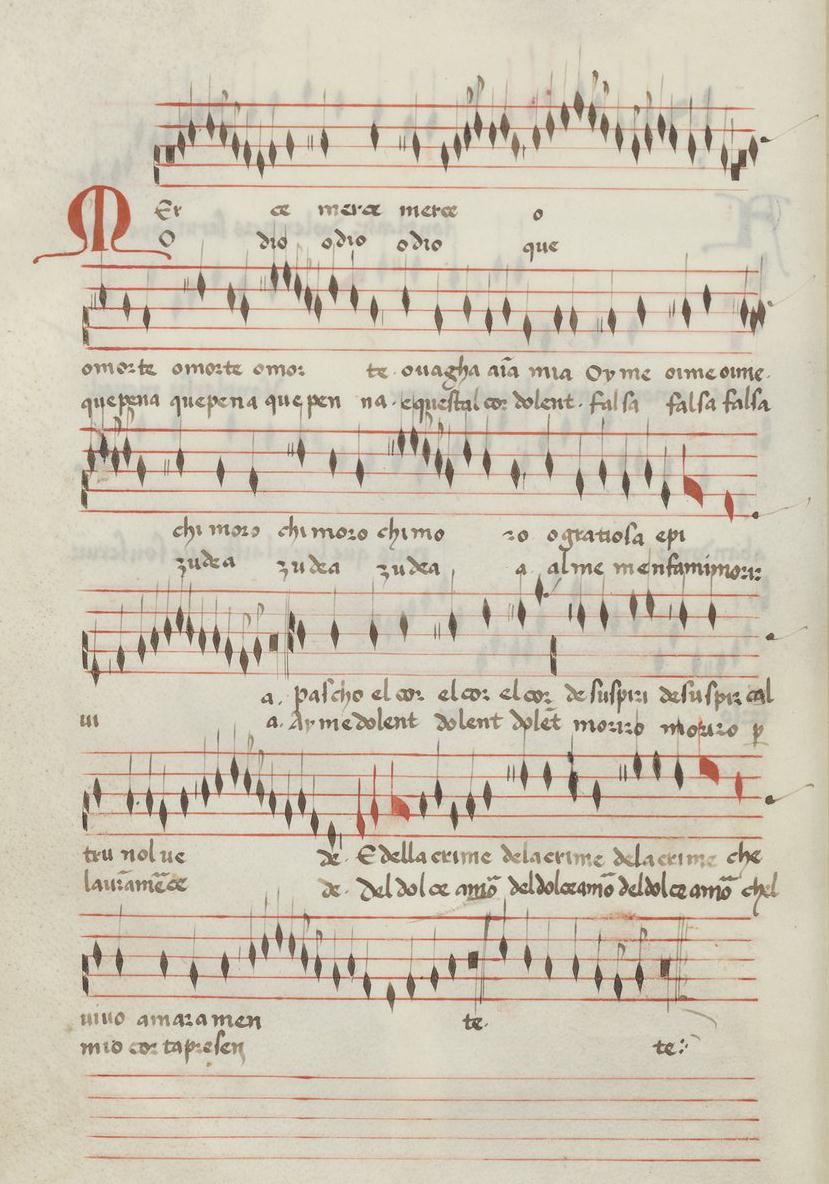
Ciconia's Merçé o morte from an early manuscript copy

Johannes Ciconia (c. 1370 – between 10 June and 13 July 1412) was an important Franco-Flemish composer and music theorist of trecento music during the late Medieval era. He was born in Liège, but worked most of his adult life in Italy, first in the papal entourage in Rome and later and most importantly at Padua Cathedral.

== Life ==
He was the son of a priest (also named Johannes Ciconia) and a woman of high social standing. Since at least three other men around Liège had that name as well, this has created biographical confusion, first solved by David Fallows in 1975. A Johannes Ciconia, probably the composer's father, worked in Avignon in 1350 as a clerk for the wife of Pope Clement VI's nephew. Another Johannes Ciconia is recorded in Liège in 1385 as a duodenus, generally identifying a person of young age; scholars agree that this is the composer himself.

Papal records suggest that Ciconia was in the service of Philppe d'Alençon, a powerful French cardinal of the schismatic Pope Boniface IX. He is believed to have worked as a clericus capelle, an important job usually held by younger musicians. His whereabouts between the early 1390s and 1401 are generally undocumented, however, due to his service to Cardinal d’Alençon, he may have been in Rome. From 1401 until his death in 1412, he was chaplain at the cathedral of Padua and a benefice at St. Biagio di Roncalea Church. From 1401 until his death in 1412, he was connected to the cathedral of Padua in some capacity, likely in the service of archpriest Francesco Zabarella for whom he wrote the motet Doctorum Principum. However, it is unclear whether Ciconia arrived in Padua even earlier than 1401.

His lament Con lagrime bagnadome is described in one source as written for the death of Francesco of Carrara – if this refers to Francesco il Nuovo ("the New"), it would date from after 1406; if, however, it was written for the death of Francesco il Vecchio ("the Old"), as scholars have assumed, this would place him in Padua as early as 1393. There is also the possibility of an intermediate stay in Pavia (as suggested by the scholars John Nádas and Agostino Ziino), on the grounds that this is where he would have connected with the House of Visconti and acquired knowledge of the ars subtilior style and the compositions of Philippus de Caserta quoted in his Sus un' fontayne ("Under a fountain") (see below). Ciconia likely lived a very comfortable life with a substantial measure of wealth due to his successes within the church.

== Music theory and humanist influence ==
As with many composers of the early renaissance period, Ciconia's compositions as well as writings on music theory are informed by the popular philosophical ideology of Humanism. Specifically, Ciconia took major influence from music theorist and composer Marchetto de Padova. This influence can be seen clearly in Ciconia's Nova Musica in reference to the classification of music intervals. In Nova Musica, Ciconia uses Marchetto’s Greek interval names for the fifth, sixth, and seventh (diapente, exaden, and heptade respectively). Most scholars today do not believe the ancient Greeks would have truly used these terms in reference to music intervals. Scholars point to many early renaissance thinkers over excitement to show of their knowledge of Greek for the reason as to why errors such as this occur (see below).

The title Nova Musica (translated as New Music) informs the reader of what Ciconia is setting out to accomplish within this treatise. He, like many early renaissance theorists, believed himself to be a reviver of ancient music theory. Ciconia makes the argument for the adoption and acceptance of the consonant third and sixth interval (typical of early renaissance composition) as well as the more dissonant tritone and seventh. His attitude towards the style and theory of what came before can be seen as partly arrogant. He believed that those who did not accept these intervals were less capable thinkers and composers, often making disobliging comments to the followers of Guido of Arezzo in his writings.

In his treatise on music theory, Nova Musica, Ciconia draws a connection between language and music composition. He draws connections between musical notes/intervals and the syllables of a word. This connection as well as a loose reliance on the "Rhetorica ad Herrenium" rhetoric structure of chreia (refining of a theme) build the basis of many of his compositional ideas. The Nova Musica also includes a section on the popular compositional technique of imitato (the repetition of melodic or rhythmic ideas in another voice or instrument). The effect of humanist thinking is not only seen within Ciconia's theoretical writings, but also in his compositional style. In the years before his death, Ciconia set to music many poems of Veneto-Humanist Leonardo Giustiniani. His setting of Con lagreme bagnandome el viso uses imitato in a way which is analogous to rhetoric patterns of humanist thinkers.

Ancient Greek texts on rhetoric such as the Rhetorica ad Herennium and Aristotle's Rhetoric were both used as the ideal works on rhetorical speaking. In these, repetition of short phrases is used as an important tool for appeals to pathos. It is safe to assume that during his time in Padua Ciconia would have become familiar with these texts and saw orations of scholars such as Vergerio who subscribed to their teachings (see below).

== Music ==
O Padua, sidus praeclarum
This is a motet performed using MIDI (2:37).

Ciconia's music is an eclectic blend of styles. Pieces typical of northern Italy, such as his madrigal Una panthera, appear with pieces steeped in the French ars nova. The more complex ars subtilior style surfaces in Sus un' fontayne. While it remains late medieval in style, his writing increasingly points toward the melodic patterning of the Renaissance, for instance in his setting of O rosa bella. He wrote music both secular (French virelais, Italian ballate and madrigals) and sacred (motets and Mass movements, some of them isorhythmic) in form. He is also the author of two treatises on music, Nova Musica and De Proportionibus (which expands on some ideas in Nova Musica). His theoretical ideas stem from the more conservative Marchettian tradition in contrast to those of his Paduan contemporary Prosdocimus de Beldemandis.

Although contrafacts and later manuscript sources of his compositions suggest that he was well known in Florence, his music is scarcely represented in major Florentine sources of the period; for instance, the Squarcialupi Codex contains nothing by Ciconia. But many of his motets and Mass movements are included in the manuscript known as "Bologna MS Museo Internazionale e Biblioteca della Musica Q15".

There exist two complete editions of Ciconia’s surviving compositions. The earliest was written by Suzanne Clercx as a second volume to her 1956 monograph, Johannes Ciconia: un musician liegeous et son temps. This edition (while impressive) consisted only of hand-written copies done by Clercx herself, and was later found to include many musical errors in transcription. The second The Works of Johannes Ciconia was compiled by scholars Margaret Bent and Anne Hallmark in 1985 as the last volume of the series Polyphonic Music of the Fourteenth Century. The Bent/Hallmark edition sparked controversy over editorship in complete editions; causing the authors to argue for the scholarly integrity of informed manuscript editing.

The two editions paint very different pictures of Ciconia as a composer. The Clercx edition initially portrayed Ciconia as an older man (due to the long term scholarly confusion between his father and himself) with innovative figure with daring intervals and melodic lines. However, the more recent and more definitive edition views these daring “choices” as mistakes. This leads scholars to believe that while Ciconia was an incredibly popular composer for his time he was not exactly the innovator that previous research may have suggested. Scholars praise the new collection for bringing new light to both the understanding and music of the composer.

== Recordings ==
- Johannes Ciconia: Oeuvre intégrale, Huelgas Ensemble (Pavane, 1982).
- Johannes Ciconia: Opera omnia, La Morra and Diabolus in Musica (ensemble) (Ricercar, 2011).
- Johannes Ciconia: Complete Motets, Mala Punica (Erato, 1998).
