= Jacob Senleches =

Franco-Flemish composer and harpist

Jacob Senleches (fl. 1382/1383 – 1395) (also Jacob de Senlechos [i.e. Senleches] and Jacopinus Senlesses) was a Franco-Flemish composer and harpist of the late Middle Ages. He composed in a style commonly known as the ars subtilior.

== Life and career ==
It has been suggested that Jacob Senleches was born in Senleches (or Sanlesches) in Cambrai, today France. In 1382, Senleches seems to have been present at the court of Eleanor of Aragon, Queen of Castile (d. September 1382), possibly in her service. In Fuions de ci, he laments Eleanor's death and resolves to seek his fortune either "en Aragon, en France ou en Bretaingne".

Afterwards, he is found in the service of Pedro de Luna, Cardinal of Aragon (later Antipope Benedict XIII, 1394–1423), as a harpist. There is a treasury document assigning payments to one "Jaquemin de Sanleches, juglar de harpe" from the royal household in Navarra dated August 21, 1383. The payment was made so that Jacquemin could return to "his master", Pedro de Luna. In a document related to the coronation of Pedro de Luna as Antipope Benedict XIII, "Jacobus de Senleches" was granted on 30 October 1394 a canonicate with expectation of a prebend at the Basilica of Saint Martin, Tours.

Despite the small number of transmitted compositions, Jacob de Senleches is counted among the central personalities of Ars subtilior. All his compositions are polyphonic settings of French texts for three parts. Some texts appear autobiographical while others participate in a widespread tradition of textual and musical citation. Senleches developed many distinctive rhythmic and notational innovations.

== Works ==
External audio
- Performance of En attendant esperance
- Performance by the Le Souvenir ensemble

Ballades:

- En attendant esperance
- Fuions de ci
- Je me merveil/ J'ay pluseurs fois

Virelai

- En ce gracieux tamps
- La harpe de melodie
- Tel me voit

== Media ==
Ballade Fuions de ci

== Transcriptions ==
Corpus mensurabilis musicae Vol. 53 – French Secular Compositions I, Ascribed Compositions (1970)

== Sources ==
- Günther, Ursula, and Maricarmen Gomez. "Senleches, Jacquemin De." In The New Grove Dictionary of Music and Musicians, edited by Stanley Sadie, 87–88. London: Grove, 2001.
- Jacob de Senleches; in: Die Musik in Gegenwart und Geschichte, Personenteil, Ed. L. Finscher, Kassel, London, 2003/2.
- Planchart, Alejandro Enrique. Guillaume Du Fay: The Life and Works, 2 vols., Cambridge, Cambridge University Press, 2017.
- Stoessel, Jason. "Symbolic Innovation: The Notation of Jacob De Senleches." Acta Musicologica 71/2 (1999): 136–64.
- Tomasello, Andrew. Music and Ritual at Papal Avignon 1309–1403. Studies in Musicology 75. Ann Arbor: UMI Research Press, 1983.
