= Luigi Morleo =

Italian percussionist and composer

- Born: 16 November 1970 (age 55)
- Website: morleoeditore.com

Music
- Genres: Classical, Folk, Jazz
- Occupations: Composer, percussionist
- Instrument: Percussion
- Label: Morleo Editore

Luigi Morleo (born 1970) is an Italian percussionist and composer of contemporary music, who lives in Bari and teaches at the Niccolò Piccinni Conservatory.

He uses varied musical and artistic styles like minimalism, rock-cross-over, folk-Pop, jazz, electronica and DJ.

The focus of his projects is on the problems of society and the various rights of humanity.

His music is published by Henry Lemoine and by Morleo Editore.
