= Arno Volk =

German musicologist and music publisher

Arno Volk (15 January 1914 – 7 July 1987) was a German musicologist and music publisher.

Born in Würzburg, Volk studied at the University of Cologne under Karl Gustav Fellerer in 1943 with the dissertation Ernst Eichner. Sein Leben und seine Bedeutung für die Entwicklung der Kammermusik und der Solokonzerte.

In 1950 he founded the Arno-Volk-Verlag in Cologne, which later merged with the Henning Müller-Buscher Laaber-Verlag.

Volk died in Ingelheim am Rhein at the age of 73.
