= Richard Hoppin =

American musicologist (1913–1991)

Richard Hallowell Hoppin (February 22, 1913 – November 1, 1991) was an American musicologist. His research centered around medieval music, the subject of his 1978 monograph.

== Life and career ==
Hoppin received his BA from Carleton College in 1936 after spending two years at the Paris Ecole Normale de Musique. He studied at Harvard University, obtaining his MA in 1938, and taught at Mount Union College from 1938 to 1942. After serving in World War II he returned to Harvard, completing his Ph.D. in 1952. From 1949 to 1961 he taught at The University of Texas, and from 1961 at Ohio State University.

Hoppin's scholarship dealt primarily with medieval music; he specialized in the Music of Cyprus in the 14th and 15th centuries. He published Medieval Music in 1978, which is a standard English-language work in the field.

== Books ==
- The Motets of the Early Fifteenth-Century Manuscript J.II.9. in the Biblioteca Nazionale of Turin (dissertation, Harvard U., 1952)
- Medieval Music (New York, 1978; French translation, 1991; Spanish translation, 2000; Slovak translation, 2007) [with accompanying anthology]
