= List of music theorists =

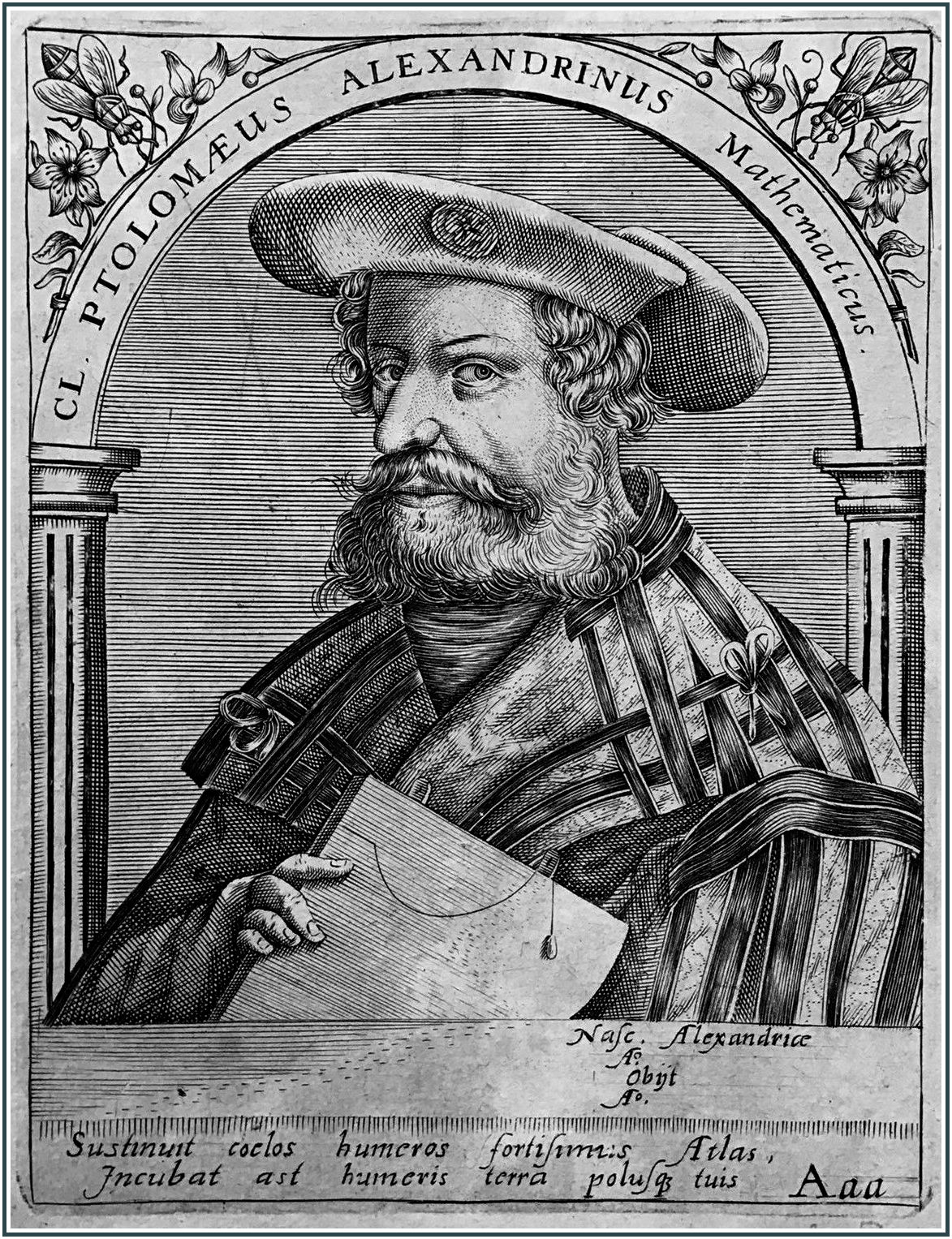
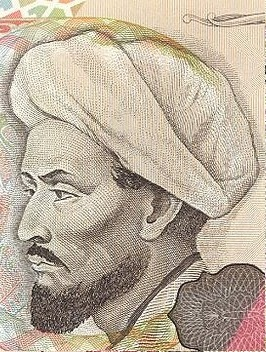
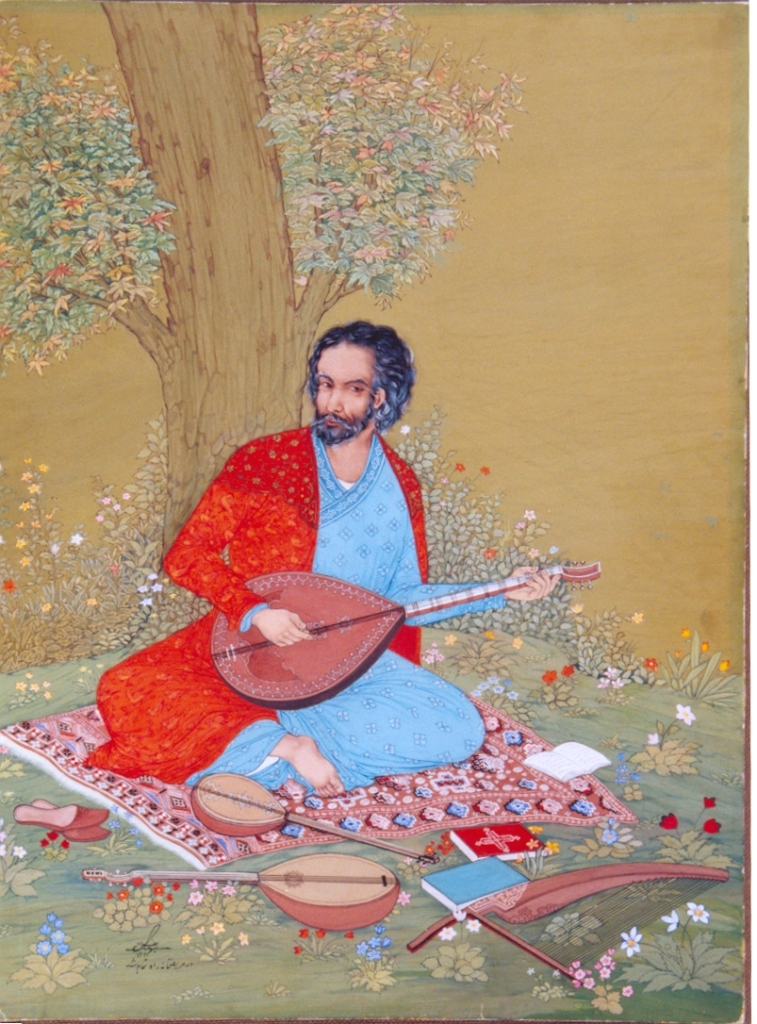
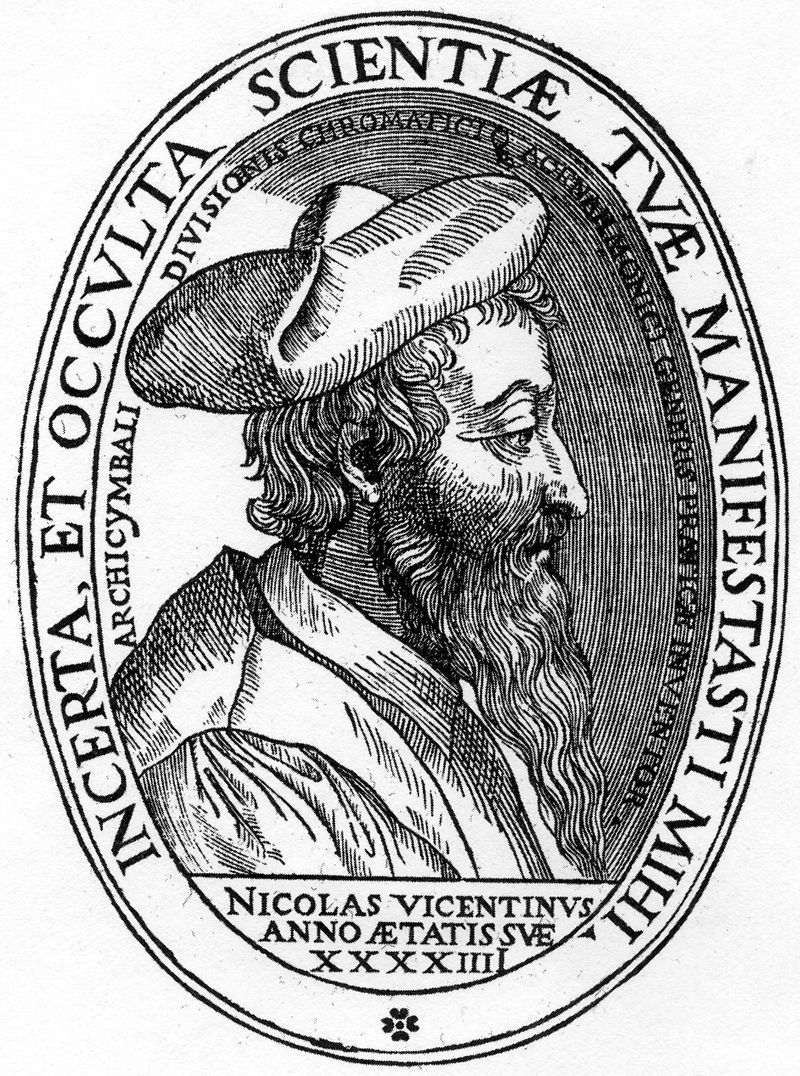
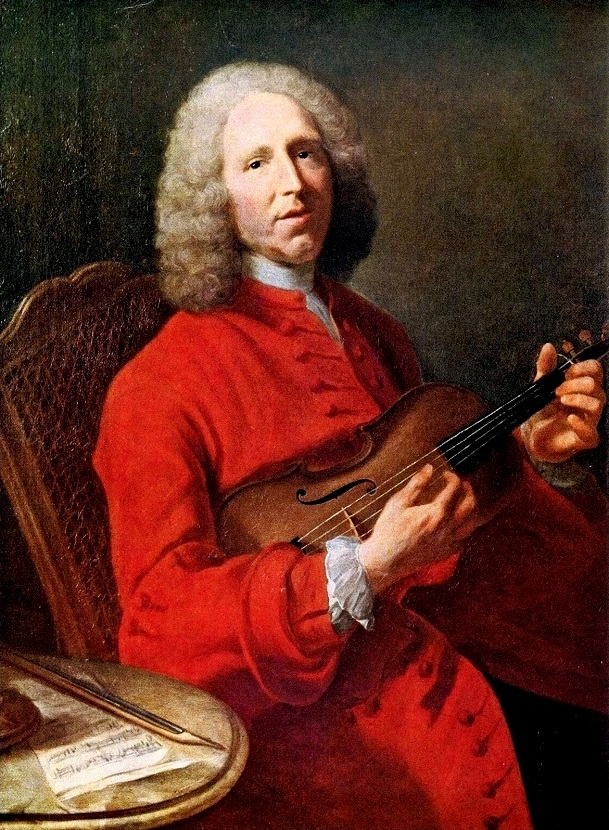
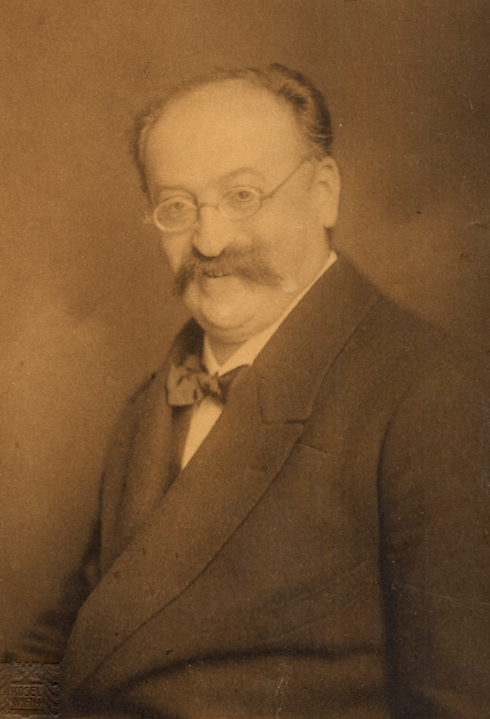
Left to right, from top left: Ptolemy (after 83 – 161); Al-Farabi (872–950); Safi al-Din al-Urmawi (c. 1216 – 1294); Nicola Vicentino (1511–1575/76); Jean-Philippe Rameau (1683–1764) Heinrich Schenker (1868–1935)

Music theory has existed since the advent of writing in ancient times. The earliest known practitioners include primarily Greek and some Chinese scholars. A few Indian sages such as Bharata Muni (Natya Shastra) are also credited with important treatises. Though much is lost, substantial treatises on ancient Greek music theory survive, including those by Aristoxenus, Nicomachus, Ptolemy and Porphyry. The influential Yue Jing Classic of Music from China is lost, though a few Ancient Chinese theorists from the Han dynasty and later have surviving contributions, such as Jing Fang and Xun Xu.

Writers of late antiquity—particularly Boethius, Cassiodorus and Isidore of Seville—were crucial in translating and transmitting much thought on music theory from classical antiquity to medieval Europe. However, the information relayed to the Post-classical era was minimal and European medieval theorists frequently misinterpreted what little Greek writings had been preserved. Important medieval European theorists include Hucbald, Guido of Arezzo, Johannes Cotto, Franco of Cologne, Philippe de Vitry. Many medieval music manuscripts of Europe were anonymous, and later compilers such as Martin Gerbert and Edmond de Coussemaker assigned names to unknown authors, such as 'Anonymous IV'. Concurrent with medieval Europe, scholars of the emerging Islamic Golden Age often more readily and thoroughly engaged with ancient Greek music treatises. Many Arab and Persian music theorists of this time have surviving works, such as Abu al-Faraj al-Isfahani, Safi al-Din al-Urmawi, Qutb al-Din al-Shirazi and Abd al-Qadir Maraghi. Theorists of the Byzantine Empire include George Pachymeres and Manuel Chrysaphes.

By the 15th century, European theorists were readily discussing the qualities of Renaissance music, with theorists such Johannes Tinctoris and Gioseffo Zarlino making important contributions to the study of counterpoint. Zarlino and Nicola Vicentino developed new theories on musical tuning, a topic which Vicentino publicly debated on with theorist Vicente Lusitano. At this time, the quality and quantity of Turkic musical sources increased, due to the rise of the Ottoman Empire. This laid the foundation of an 18th-century musical golden age in Eastern Europe and the Middle East, exemplified by composer-theorists such as Kasımpaşalı Osman Effendi, Dimitrie Cantemir and Abdülbaki Nasır Dede. Meanwhile, the Age of Enlightenment and the common practice period in Europe led to substantial changes in the nature of published music theory.

== Antiquity ==
Name	Lifetime	Nationality	Major writing	Known for	Ref(s)
Archytas	fl. early 4th century BCE	Greek	Only fragments and later citations survive In Barker 1989, pp. 39–52	Naming the harmonic mean; a theory of acoustics correlating pitch with the speed of sound; may have been the first to describe the quadrivium	
Aristoxenus	c. 375–360 BCE – ?	Greek	Ἁρμονικὰ στοιχεῖα [Elements of Harmony] In Barker 1989, pp. 119–189 and elsewhere	The oldest surviving substantial work of music theory. Foundational and comprehensive, though not completely extant	
Archestratus (Note: There is a "rather remote" possibility that he is identical with Archestratus of Syracuse.)	fl. early 3rd century BCE	Greek	Περὶ αὐλητῶν [On auletes]; (Note: This attribution is tentative. It is based on the assumption that the Archestratus quoted and discussed in both Porphyry's commentary on Ptolemy's Harmonics and Philodemus's De musica is the same Archestratus who wrote the two volume Περὶ αὐλητῶν [On auletes]) quotations in Porphyry and Philodemus In Barker 2009, pp. 394–395, 410–411	Tetrachord theory concerning the pyknon	
Ptolemais of Cyrene	Perhaps fl. 250 BCE	Greek	Πυθαγορικὴ τῆς μουσικῆς στοιχείωσις [The Pythagorean Principles of Music] (lost); Quoted by Porphyry In Barker 1989, pp. 239–242	Theories on the proper roles of reason and sensory experience in the study of music. The only known female music theorist of antiquity.	
Eratosthenes	c. 276 – c. 196 BCE	Greek	Only fragments and later citations survive In Barker 1989, pp. 364–369	Calculating of the tuning of the tetrachord degrees	
Didymos	fl. Late 1st century BCE	Greek	Only fragments and later citations survive; quoted by Porphyry, Ptolemy and Clement of Alexandria (Note: The full titles of his now lost works were said to be Περὶ τῆς διαφορᾶς τῶν Ἀριστοξενείων τε καὶ Πυθαγορείων [Concerning the Difference between the Pythagorean and Aristoxenian Theories of Music] and Concerning Pythagorean Philosophy) In Barker 1989, pp. 229–230, 242ff, 342ff	Theories on chromatic tetrachords	
Jing Fang	78–37 BCE	Chinese	京式段嘉 [Jīng Shì Duàn Jiā]; excerpts in the 淮南子 Huainanzi and 隋書 Book of Sui	Discovered that 53 perfect fifths was approximate to 31 octaves while creating a musical scale of 60 tones	
Bharata	fl. Early centuries CE	Indian	नाट्य शास्त्र [Natya Shastra]	Wrote a comprehensive overview of ancient Indian music	
Dionysius the Areopagite	fl. 1st century CE	Roman	Concerning the Divine Hymns (lost); quoted by Dionysius	Purportedly one of the only treatises that discussed the Byzantine rite	
Nicomachus of Gerasa	fl. late 1st – early 2nd century CE	Greek	Ἐγχειρίδιον ἁρμονικῆς [Manual of Harmonics]; Θεολογούμενα ἀριθμητικῆς [Theology of Arithmetic] In Barker 1989, pp. 245–269; Zanoncelli, pp. 133–204	The only significant extant music theory works between Aristoxenus/Euclid and Ptolemy.	
Ptolemy	after 83 – 161 CE	Greek	Ἁρμονικόν [Harmonics] In Barker 1989, pp. 270–391	Among the most comprehensive and through music theory works of antiquity	
Cleonides	After the 1st century CE	Greek	Εἰσαγωγὴ ἁρμονική [Introduction to Harmonics] In Strunk, pp. 35–46; Zanoncelli, pp. 71–132	Introduces Aristoxenus' harmonic system. Influenced Manuel Bryennius considerably	
Theon of Smyrna	fl. early 2nd century	Greek	On Mathematics Useful for the Understanding of Plato In Barker 1989, pp. 209–229	Discusses music of numbers, instrumental music, and "music of the spheres"	
Adrastus of Aphrodisias	fl. 2nd century	Greek	Περὶ Ἁρμονικῶν [On Harmonics] (lost); Quoted by Theon of Smyrna In Barker 1984, p. 210	Writings on harmonics	
Xun Xu	c. 221 – 289	Chinese	Quoted in the 隋書 [Book of Song], vol. 6	Linked the Heptatonic scale with the Shí-èr-lǜ. Developed a new finger-hole system for the dizi	
Porphyry	c. 232/233 – c. 305	Greek	Commentary on Ptolemy's Harmonics In Barker 1984, pp. 229–244	Included substantial commentary on earlier theorists, sometimes quoting otherwise lost works. May have been the earliest Western writer to criticize secular music for its purported "sensual attraction"	
Gaudentius	fl. 3rd – 4th century	Greek	Εἰσαγωγὴ ἁρμονική [Harmonic Introduction] In Strunk, pp. 66–85; Zanoncelli, pp. 305–369	Synthesized the music theory of Pythagoras and Aristoxenus. Influenced Cassiodorus considerably	
Alypius	fl. 4th century CE	Greek	Εἰσαγωγὴ Μουσική [Introduction to Music] In Zanoncelli, pp. 371–464	Comprehensive explanation of ancient Greek musical notation	
Aristides Quintilianus	fl. late 3rd and early 4th centuries	Greek	Περὶ Μουσικῆς [On Music] In Barker 1989, pp. 392–395	Most comprehensive Greek writings on music's relationship to other topics	
He Chengtian	370–447	Chinese	Treatise on Harmonics (lost) (Note: The now-lost Treatise on Harmonics was an early draft expanded upon by Shen Yue in his Treatise on Harmonic and Celestial Systematics. It is tentatively attributed to He Chengtian.)	Developed a theory of equal temperament	
Bacchius	fl. 4th century	Greek	Eisagōgē technēs mousikēs [Introduction to the Art of Music] In Zanoncelli, pp. 245–304	General introductory text	
Martianus Capella	fl. early 5th century	Roman	Book 9 of De nuptiis Philologiae et Mercurii [On the Marriage of Philology and Mercury]	Includes a translation of Aristides Quintilianus's On Music	
Shen Yue	441–513	Chinese	Treatise on Harmonic and Celestial Systematics Earlier version in the 隋書 [Book of Song] (Note: Shen Yue's Treatise on Harmonic and Celestial Systematics was compiled and edited in c. 500. An earlier version had been included in the Book of Song (commissioned in 488), included in four of its volumes: 19, 20, 21 and 22.)	Includes Xun Xu's developed dizi finger-hole system	

== 6th–14th centuries ==
Name	Lifetime	Nationality	Major writing	Known for	Ref(s)
Boethius	c. 480 – 524	Roman	De institutione musica	Transmission of ancient Greek music theory	
Cassiodorus	c. 485 – 585	Roman	Institutiones Divinarum et Saecularium Litterarum	Helped formalize the seven liberal arts	
Isidore of Seville	c. 559 – 636	Spanish	Etymologiarum sive Originum libri xx (chapters 15–23 deal with music)		
Al-Khalil ibn Ahmad al-Farahidi	718 – 786	Arab		ʿArūḍ and its application to music	
Yunus al-Katib al-Mughanni	fl. late-8th century	Persian	Kitab al-Nagham		
Al-Kindi	801–873	Arab	Al-risāla al-kubrā fī al-ta’līf (Grand treatise on composition)		
Ibn Khordadbeh	820–912	Persian	Kitāb al-lahw wa-l-malahi	Description of music in pre-Islamic Persia	
Aurelian of Réôme	fl. 840–850	Frankish	Musica disciplina	Earliest extant treatise on medieval music	
Johannes Scottus Eriugena	c. 810 – c. 877	Irish	De divisione naturae and De divisione naturae	Mentions organum (scholars doubt this refers to polyphony)	
Hucbald	c. 850 – 930		De musica (formerly known as De harmonica institutione)	"One of the foremost expositors of music theory in the Carolingian era"	
Anonymous 8	9th century		Musica enchiriadis	earliest extant discussion of polyphonic singing and the first chant melodies preserved in a precise pitch notation	
Abu Ahmad Monajjem	855 or 866 – 912		Resāla fi’l-mūsīqī	Oldest extant Middle Eastern treatise with a detailed description of modal structure	
Regino of Prüm	c. 842 – 915		De synodalibus causis and Epistola de armonica institutione	"Correct the intonations and confirm the modes of the antiphons and responsories of the Mass and Office"	
Al-Farabi	872–950	Arab	Kitāb al-mūsīqī al-kabīr (Great book on music)	"most imposing of all Arabic works on music"	
Abu al-Faraj al-Isfahani	897–967	Arab	Kitab al-Aghani (Book of Songs)		
Notker Labeo	950–1022				
Anonymous, of the Brethren of Purity	second half of the 10th century		Rasa’il Ikhwan al-Safa, Epistle 5: On Music		
Guido of Arezzo	c. 991–992	Italian	Micrologus		
Avicenna (Ibn-Sīnā)	c. 980 – 1037	Persian	Danishnama-i 'Alai		
Abhinavagupta	fl. c. 1000	Indian	Abhinavabharati	Important commentary on the Natya Shastra	
Berno of Reichenau	d. 1048		Musica Seu Prologus In Tonarium	He compiled a tonarius, dealing with the organisation of the church chants into ‘tones’ – eight modes of the Gregorian chant.	
Ibn Zaylah	d. 1048		al-Kāfī fī al-mūsīqī		
Hermannus Contractus	1013–1054				
Michael Psellos	1018 – after 1078	Byzantine	Eis tēn psychogonian tou Platōnos; Prolambanomena eis tēn rhythmikēn epistēmēn On the Resounding Hall at Nicomedia		
Aribo Scholasticus	fl. 1068–1078		De musica	also known as simply "Aribo." Created a "caprea," a diagram showing modal tetrachords superimposed on the gamut.	
Wilhelm of Hirsau	died 1091		De musica		
Frutolf of Michelsberg	mid-11th century – 1103	German	Brevarium	compiler of treatises, in particular Boethius and Berno of Reichenau.	
Theogerus of Metz	c. 1050 – c. 1120		Musica		
Johannes Cotto	fl. 1100		De musica		
Avempace	c. 1085 – 1138		Risālah fī l-alḥān		
Cai Yuanding	1135–1198	Chinese	Lülü xinshu [New treatise of music theory]	Theories on scales, pitches and intervals	
Hermann of Carinthia	fl. 1138–43		De essentiis	Translating Arabic treatises into Latin	
Guido of Eu	fl. 1130s		supposed author of Regule de arte musica	earliest Cistercian treatise on music theory.	
Jiang Kui	1155–1221	Chinese	Dayueyi and Qinse kaogutu	Two treatises, the Dayueyi on proper music (yayue) and the Qinse kaogutu on the qin and se zithers. Also created a popular 18 symbol form of music notation	
Theinred of Dover (Theinredus Doverensis)	12th century		De legitimis ordinibus pentachordorum et tetrachordorum	discussion of chromatically altered tones in plainsong	
Tanchi (堪智)	(1163 – 1237?)	Japanese		Introduced strict music theory of shōmyō, based on that of gagaku. This included standards for modulation, rhythm, pitch and new five-tone notation system (goin-bakase)	
Śārṅgadeva	fl. early 13th century	Indian	Sangita Ratnakara [Ocean of Music]	Wrote the authoritative text for subsequent Indian music	
Ficker Anonymous	early 13th century		Ars organi		
Franco of Cologne	fl. mid to late 13th century	German	Ars cantus mensurabilis	Franconian Notation	
Safi al-Din al-Urmawi	c. 1216 – 1294	Persian	Kitab al-Adwār and Risālah al-Sharafiyyah fi 'l-nisab al-taʾlifiyyah (The Sharafiyyah Letter on the Art of Composing)		
Bartholomeus Anglicus	before 1203 – 1272	French			
George Pachymeres	1242 – c. 1310	Byzantine	Syntagma tōn tessarōn mathēmatōn, arithmētikēs, mousikēs, geōmetrias kai astronomias		
Egidius de Zamora	fl. 1260–1280		Ars musica	noted for inclusion of Spanish instruments and description of organ used in church.	
Amerus	fl. 1271	English	Practica artis musice		
Jerome of Moravia	died after 1272		Tractatus de musica		
Anonymous IV	fl. 1270 – 1280		De mensuris et discantu		
Magister Lambertus	fl. c. 1270		Tractatus de musica		
Engelbert of Admont	c. 1250 – 1331		De musica tractatus		
Jacob of Liège	c. 1260 – after 1330				
Johannes de Garlandia	fl. 1270–1320	French	De Mensurabili Musica	Explains the rhythmic modes, particularly that which the Notre-Dame school engaged in	
Petrus de Cruce	late 13th century	French			
Johannes Balox	late 13th century		Gaudent brevitate moderni		
Petrus Picardus	mid-13th century		Ars motettorum compilata breviter		
Elias Salomo	late 13th century		Scientia artis musice		
Qutb al-Din al-Shirazi	c. 1236 - 1311	Persian	Dorrat al-tāj fi ḡorrat al-dabbāj		
Philippe de Vitry	1291–1361	French	Ars nova notandi (1322)		
Hugo Spechtshart	c. 1285 – 1359/60		Flores musicae omnis cantus Gregoriani		
Johannes Vetulus de Anagnia	1st half of 14th century]		Liber de musica		
Petrus frater dictus Palma ociosa	fl. early 14th century		Compendium de discantu mensurabili		
Johannes de Grocheio	fl. 1300	French	Ars musicae		
Manuel Bryennius	14th century	Byzantine	Harmonika		
Walter Odington	died 1330	English			
Johannes de Muris	c. 1290 – after 1344	French			
Marchetto da Padova	fl. 1305–19	Italian	Lucidarium in arte musice plane and Pomerium in arte musice mensurate		
Robert de Handlo	fl. 1326	English			
John Hanboys	fl. c. 1370	English	Summa		
John of Tewkesbury	fl. 1351–92	English	Quatuor principalia musice	Writings on ars nova	
al-Āmulī	died 1352	Persian	Nafā’is al-funūn	His Nafā’is al-funūn on the quadrivium contains a chapter on music theory; it is one of the few surviving Persian sources dated in the time between the works of Qutb al-Din al-Shirazi and Abd al-Qadir Maraghi	
Ibn Kurr	Died 1357	Arab	Ġāyat al-matḷūb fī 'ilm al-adwār wa-'l-dụrūb (The Enticing Roads to Rhythms and Modes)	Examines musical discourse of 14th-century Cario	
Johannes Boen	Died 1367	Dutch	Ars [musicae]; Musica	Writings on ars nova	
Johannes Ciconia	1360–1412	Flemish	Nova musica [New Music]	Discusses music as an art	
Philippus de Caserta	fl. c. 1370	Active in France	Tractatus figurarum (attributed)		
Zhu Quan	1378–1448	Chinese	神奇秘谱 [Wondrous and secret notation] (1425) and 太和正音譜 [Song Register of Great Harmony and Accurate Tones] (1398)	Studies on qin music; classification and analysis of over 300 melodies from Chinese dramas	
Ugolino of Forlì	c. 1380–1452	Italian	Declaratio musicae disciplinae [Declaration of the Discipline of Music]		
John Laskaris	fl. first half of 15th century	Byzantine	The Interpretation and Parallage of the Art of Music	Discusses the Byzantine modal system	
Gabriel Hieromonachos	fl. first half of the 15 century	Byzantine	Discourse on the Signs of Chant	–	
Manuel Chrysaphes	fl. 1440–1463	Byzantine	Peri tōn entheōroumenōn tē psaltikē technē kai hōn phronousi kakōs tines peri autōn [On the Theory of the Art of Chanting and On Certain Erroneous Views That Some Hold about It]	Includes otherwise unknown information on Byzantine singing, modal theory and general musical practice	

== 15th and 16th centuries ==
Name	Lifetime	Major writing	Known for	Ref(s)
Fernand Estevan	fl. 1410	Reglas de canto plano è de contrapunto, è de canto de organo		
Kırşehrî Yusuf	fl. 1411	Kitâbü’l Edvâr		
Prosdocimus de Beldemandis	d. 1428	Brevis summula proportionum quantum ad musicam pertinet		
Abd al-Qadir Maraghi	d. 1435	Makâsıd al-Alhân	Corpus attributed to him was a seminal work of the 17th century renaissance of Ottoman music	
Giorgio Anselmi	c. 1386 – c. 1440/43	De musica		
Ugolino of Forlì; Also Ugolino of Orvieto	c. 1380 – c. 1452			
Fatḥallāh al-Shirwānī	d. approximately 1453	Majalla fī 'l-mūsīqī [Codex on music]		
Antonius de Leno	early 15th century	Regulae de contrapunto (title created by Coussemaker from incomplete treatise)		
John Hothby	c. 1410 – 1487			
Johannes Gallicus	c. 1415 – 1473	Praefatio libelli musicalis de ritu canendi vetustissimo et novo	First 15th century theorist to describe attributes of Renaissance music.	
Nicolaus Polonus	15th-century	Tractatus musicalis ad cantum gregorialem brevis et utilis	Authored an introduction on singing	
Ladikli Mehmet Chelebi	fl. 1483	Zeynü’l-elḥân fî ʿilmi’t-teʾlîf ve’l-evzân		
Johannes Tinctoris	c. 1435 – 1511	Terminorum musicae diffinitorium		
Bartolomeus Ramis de Pareia	c. 1440 – after 1491			
Muhammad al-Ladiqi	d. 1494	Risâla al-fathiyya fi’l-al-müsïqï		
Janus Plousiadenos	d. approximately 1500		His system of parallage	
Adam von Fulda	1445–1505	Musica		
Johannes Cochlaeus	1449–1552			
Hızır bin Abdullah	fl. mid-15th century	Kitābü’l-edvār	His work on fragmentary modal structures (terkîb), in which he defined a total of 240 modes.	
Hadji Büke	fl. mid-15th century	Mukaddimetü’l Usûl	Noted for his pioneering work on compound (mürekkep) makams.	
Hace Abdülaziz	fl. mid-15th century	Nekavetü’l Edvâr		
Franchinus Gaffurius	1451–1522	Practica musicae, 1496		
Nicolò Burzio	1453–1528	Musices opusculum		
Giovanni Spataro	1458–1541	Tractato di musica di Gioanni Spataro musico bolognese nel quale si tracta de la perfectione da la sesqualtera producta in la musica mensurata exercitate		
Jacques Lefèvre d'Étaples (alias Jacobus Faber Stapulensis)	c. 1460 – 1536	Musica libris demonstrata quattuor, Paris 1496		
Domingo Marcos Durán	c. 1460 – 1529			
Erasmus Horicius	c. 1465 – early 16th century	Musica and Tractatus de sphera		
Michael Keinspeck	c. 1470 – mid-16th century	Lilium musicae planae		
Lodovico Fogliano	c. 1475 – 1542	Musica theorica (Venice, 1529)		
Johannes Aventinus	1477–1534			
Pietro Aaron	c. 1480 – c. 1550			
Nicolaus Wollick	c. 1480 – 1541	Enchiridion musices (1512)		
Sebastian z Felsztyna	c. 1480/1490? – after 1543			
Melchior Schanppecher	born c. 1480	Opus aurem musicae (Cologne, 1501)		
John Tucke	c. 1482 – after 1539	His notebook (British Library, Additional Ms. 10336)		
Martin Agricola	1486–1556			
Heinrich Glarean	1488–1563			
Georg Rhau	1488–1548			
Giovanni Del Lago	c. 1490 – 1544	Correspondence with Giovanni Spataro and Pietro Aaron		
Giovanni Maria Lanfranco	c. 1490 – 1545	Scintille di musica	Author of the earliest treatise on music theory in Italian	
Andreas Ornitoparchus	born c. 1490	Musicae activae micrologus (Leipzig, 1517)		
Bonaventura da Brescia	late 15th century	Breviloquium musicale (Brescia, 1497) (later editions known as Regula musicae planae)		
Guilielmus Monachus	late 15th century	De preceptis artis musicae		
Guillermo de Podio	late 15th century	Ars musicorum (Valencia, 1495); In enchiridion de principiis musicae		
Kadızade Mehmet Tirevî	late 15th century	Risâle-i Mûsîkî		
Silvestro Ganassi dal Fontego	c. 1492 – mid-16th century	Opera intitulata Fontegara (Venice, 1535) Regola Rubertina (Venice, 1542) Lettione Seconda (Venice, 1543)		
Henricus Grammateus (alias Heinrich Schreiber)	1495–1525/6			
Sebald Heyden	1499–1561	De arte canendi (Nuremberg, 1532–40)		
Heinrich Faber	before 1500–1552	Compendiolum musicae (1548) De musica poetica (1548) Ad musicam practicam introductio (1550)		
Simon de Quercu	early 16th century	Opusculum musices (Vienna, 1509)		
Vicente Lusitano	16th century	Introdutione facilissima et novissima de canto fermo (Rome, 1553)		
Seydî	fl. early 16th century	Al-Matlah		
Auctor Lampadius	c. 1500 – 1559	Compendium musices, tam figurati quam plani cantus, ad formam dialogi (Berne, 1537, 5/1554)		
Adrianus Petit Coclico	c. 1500 – 1562			
Juan Bermudo	c. 1510 – 1565	Libro primero de la Declaración de instrumentos musicales (1549) Comiença el Arte Tripharia(1550)		
Nikolaus Listenius	born c. 1510	Rudimenta musicae (1533)		
Ghiselin Danckerts	c. 1510 – after 1565			
Diego Ortiz	c. 1510 – 1570			
Nicola Vicentino	1511–1576			
Francisco de Salinas	1513–1590			
Gioseffo Zarlino	1517–1590			
Girolamo Mei	1519–1594			
Illuminato Aiguino	1520–1581	Illuminata de tutti i tuoni di canto fermo (Venice, 1562)		
Vincenzo Galilei	late 1520–1591			
Wei Liangfu	fl. 1522–72	Qulü [Principles of arias]	Theories of singing and composition (in the Kunshan qiang tradition)	
Hermann Finck	1527–1558			
Francisco de Montanos	c. 1528 – after 1592	Arte de música (1592)		
Ercole Bottrigari	1531–1612			
Pietro Pontio	1532–1595			
Gallus Dressler	1533 – c. 1580/89			
Orazio Tigrini	c. 1535 – 1591	Il compendio della musica nel quale si tratta dell’arte del contrapunto		
Zhu Zaiyu	1536–1611	Lüxue xinshuo and Lülü jingyi	Possibly the first person to accurately describe equal temperament	
Giovanni Maria Artusi	c. 1540 – 1613			
Giulio Caccini	c. 1545 – 1618			
Cyriakus Schneegass	1546–1597			
Philibert Jambe de Fer	fl. 1548–1564			
Simon Stevin	1548–1620	Two incomplete treatises	Theories of consonance	
Ramamatya	fl. 1550	Svaramelakalanidhi [Treasury of Musical Scales] c. 1550		
Riccardo Rognoni	c. 1550 – 1620	Passaggi per potersi esercitare nel diminuire, Venice 1592		
Elway Bevin	c. 1554 – 1638			
Girolamo Diruta	c. 1554 – after 1610			
Lodovico Zacconi	1555–1627			
Sethus Calvisius	1556–1615			
Johannes Nucius	c. 1556 – 1620			
Thomas Morley	c. 1557 – 1602			
Adam Gumpelzhaimer	1559–1625			
Giovanni Luca Conforti	c. 1560 – 1608	Breve et facile maniera d’essercitarsi..., Rome 1593		
Charles Butler	1560–1647	The Principles of Musik (1636)		
Giovanni Bassano	1560/61–1617	Ricercate, passaggi et cadentie, Venice 1585		
Pietro Cerone	1561–1625			
Jan Pieterszoon Sweelinck	1562–1621			
William Bathe	1564–1614			
Joachim Burmeister	1564–1629			
Johannes Christoph Demantius	1567–1643			
Thomas Campion	1567–1620			
Adriano Banchieri	1568–1634			
Girolamo Dalla Casa	before 1568 – 1601	Il vero modo di diminuir con tutte le sorti di stromenti di fiato, & corda, & di voce humana Venice: Angelo Gardano 1584		
Michael Praetorius	c. 1569/73 – 1621			
Tomás de Santa María	died 1570	Arte de tañer fantasía		
Eucharius Hoffmann	died 1588			
Rudolf Schlick	flourished 1588	Exercitatio, qua musices origo prima, cultus antiquissimus, dignitas maxima et emolumenta ... breviter ac dilucide exponuntur, Speyer, 1588		
Giovanni Battista Bovicelli	fl 1592–94	Regole, passaggi di musica, madrigali et motetti passeggiati, Venice, 1594		

== 17th century ==
Name	Lifetime	Major writing	Known for	Ref(s)
John Coprario	c. 1570–80 – 1626	Rules how to Compose (c. 1610–1616)		
Johannes Kepler	1571–1630	Harmonices Mundi		
Robert Fludd	1574–1637			
Salomon de Caus	c. 1576 – 1626			
Gerhard Johann Vossius	1577–1649			
Agostino Agazzari	1578–1640	Del sonare sopra il basso, 1607		
Henricus Baryphonus	1581–1655			
Severo Bonini	1582–1663			
Thomas Ravenscroft	c. 1582 – 1635			
Johannes Lippius	1585–1612	Synopsis musicae novae (1612) [Synopsis of New Music]	Coined the term "harmonic triad"	
Johann Heinrich Alsted	1588–1638			
Johann Andreas Herbst	1588–1666			
Marin Mersenne	1588–1648			
Heinrich Grimm	1593–1637			
Giovanni Battista Doni	1595–1647			
António Fernandes	c. 1595 – after 1680	Arte de musica de canto dorgam, e canto cham & proporções, Lisbon, 1626		
René Descartes	1596–1650			
Galeazzo Sabbatini	1597–1662			
Joan Albert Ban	1597–1644			
Johann Crüger	1598–1662			
Antoine de Cousu	c. 1600 – 1658			
Marco Scacchi	c. 1600 – 1681/87			
Athanasius Kircher	1601–1680			
Christopher Simpson	c. 1605 – 1669			
Wojciech Bobowski	c. 1610–1675	Mecmûa-i Sâz ü Söz	Introduction of staff notation to Ottoman music, which would overtake abjad notation in the 19th century.	
Hans Mikkelsen Ravn	c. 1610 – 1663			
Wolfgang Ebner	1612–1665			
Otto Gibelius	1612–1682			
Thomas Mace	1612/3 – c. 1706			
Lorenzo Penna	1613–1693			
William Holder	1616–1696			
John Wallis	1616–1703			
Isaac Vossius	1618–1689			
Matthew Locke	1621–1677			
John Playford	1623–1686			
Kasımpaşalı Osman Effendi	fl. c. 1623			
Andrés Lorente	1624–1703			
René Ouvrard	1624–1694			
Bénigne de Bacilly	c. 1625 – 1690			
Giovanni Andrea Bontempi	c. 1624 – 1705			
Christoph Bernhard	1628–1692			
Christiaan Huygens	1629–1695			
Venkatamakhin	fl. c. 1630	Chaturdandiprakashika [The Illuminator of the Four Pillars of Music]		
Guillaume-Gabriel Nivers	c. 1632 – 1714			
Mykola Pavlovych Dyletsky	c. 1630 – after 1680			
Angelo Berardi	c. 1636 – 1694			
Daniel Speer	1636–1707			
Francis North	1637–1685			
Wolfgang Caspar Printz	1641–1717			
Giovanni Maria Bononcini	1642–1678			
Jean Rousseau	1644–1700			
Andreas Werckmeister	1645–1706			
Gottfried Wilhelm Leibniz	1646–1716			
Thomas Salmon	1648–1706			
Çengi Yusuf Dede	fl. c. 1650			
Johann Georg Ahle	1651–1706			
Giovanni Battista Chiodini	died 1652	Arte pratica latina et volgare di far contrapunto à mente, & à penna, 1610		
Joseph Sauveur	1653–1716			
Georg Muffat	1653–1704			
Nâyî Osman Dede	fl. c. 1680–1729	Rabt-ı Tâbirât-ı Mûsikî		
Pier Francesco Tosi	c. 1653 – 1732			
Pablo Nassarre	c. 1654 – 1730			
Johann Baptist Samber	1654–1717			
Johann Beer	1655–1700			
Sébastien de Brossard	1655–1730			
Étienne Loulié	c. 1655 – 1707			
Nicola Matteis	fl. 1670–c. 1698			
Friedrich Erhard Niedt	1674–1717			
Charles Masson	fl. 1680–1700			
De La Voye-Mignot	died 1684			

== 18th century ==
Name	Lifetime	Major writing	Known for	Ref(s)
Johann Joseph Fux	1660–1741	Gradus ad Parnassum	Palestrinian style of Renaissance polyphony	
Johann Kuhnau	1660–1722			
Tomáš Baltazar Janovka	1669 –1741			
Francesco Gasparini	1661–1727			
Johann Heinrich Buttstett	1666–1727			
Johann Christoph Pepusch	1667–1752			
David Kellner	c. 1670 – 1748			
Dimitrie Cantemir	1673 – 1723	Kitâbu 'İlmi'l-Mûsiki alâ Vechi'l-Hurûfât (or simply Edvâr)	The empirical school of Ottoman music theory, Cantemir notation, description of pseudo-makam	
Georg Philipp Telemann	1681–1767			
Johann Mattheson	1681–1764			
Jean-Philippe Rameau	1683–1764	Treatise on Harmony reduced to its natural principles		
Johann David Heinichen	1683–1729			
Meinrad Spieß	1683–1761			
Johann Gottfried Walther	1684–1748			
Alexander Malcolm	1685–1763			
Johann Georg Neidhardt	1685–1739			
François Campion	c. 1686 – 1748			
Francesco Geminiani	1687–1762			
Giuseppe Tartini	1692–1770			
Francesco Antonio Vallotti	1697–1780			
Jakob Adlung	1699–1762			
Christoph Gottlieb Schröter	1699–1782			
William Tans'ur	1700–1783			
Georg Andreas Sorge	1703–1778			
Gottfried Keller	died 1704			
Giovanni Battista Martini	1706–1784			
Leonhard Euler	1707–1783	Tentamen novae theoriae musicae (Attempt at a New Theory of Music)	See Leonhard Euler#Music	
Johann Adolph Scheibe	1708–1776			
Joseph Riepel	1709–1782			
Lorenz Christoph Mizler Kolof	1711–1778			
Jean-Jacques Rousseau	1712–1778			
Nicola Sala	1713–1801			
Carl Philipp Emanuel Bach	1714–1788			
Pierre-Joseph Roussier	1716–1792			
Jean le Rond d'Alembert	1717–1783			
Friedrich Wilhelm Marpurg	1718–1795			
Leopold Mozart	1719–1787			
Johann Friedrich Agricola	1720–1774			
Johann Georg Sulzer	1720–1779			
Martin Gerbert	1720–1793			
Kevserî	fl. 1720–1740	Kevserî Mecmuası		
Johann Philipp Kirnberger	1721–1783			
Giuseppe Paolucci	1726–1776			
Antonio Soler	1729–1783			
Luigi Antonio Sabbatini	c. 1732 – 1809			
Johann Georg Albrechtsberger	1736–1809			
Vincenzo Manfredini	1737–1799			
Panayotis Chalatzoglou	fl. 1740–1748		Comparative study of Ottoman and Byzantine modal systems.	
Petros Peloponnesios	1740–1788	His codex of music		
Johann Abraham Peter Schulz	1747–1800			
Maximilian Stadler	1748–1833			
Georg Michael Telemann	1748–1831			
Johann Nikolaus Forkel	1749–1818			
Heinrich Christoph Koch	1749–1816			
Abbé Vogler	1749–1814			
Kyrillos Marmarinos	fl. 1749			
Augustus Frederic Christopher Kollmann	1756–1829			
Daniel Gottlob Türk	1756–1813			
Luigi Cherubini	1760–1842			
Jérôme-Joseph de Momigny	1762–1842			
Abdülbâki Nâsır Dede	1765–1821	Tedkîk u Tahkîk		
Bedřich Diviš Weber	1766–1842			
Hampartsoum Limondjian	1768–1839		Hampartsoum notation	
Józef Elsner	1769–1854			
Anton Reicha	1770–1836			
Alexandre-Étienne Choron	1771–1834			
Charles Simon Catel	1773–1830			
Matthew Peter King	1773–1823			
Johann Anton André	1775–1842			
Johann Bernhard Logier	1777–1846			
Gottfried Weber	1779–1839			

== 19th century ==
Name	Lifetime	Major writing	Known for	Ref(s)
Christian Theodor Weinlig	1780–1842	Theoretisch-praktische Anleitung zur Fuge für den Selbstunterricht (1842)	Fugue theory	
François-Joseph Fétis	1784–1871	Traité complet de la théorie et de la pratique de l'harmonie (1844)	Frameworks of tonality and harmony	
Simon Sechter	1788–1867			
Carl Czerny	1791–1857	Theoretico-Practical Piano School Volume 4, Vienna, 1847		
Moritz Hauptmann	1792–1868			
Adolf Bernhard Marx	c. 1795–1866			
Sarah Mary Fitton	c. 1796–1874			
Johann Christian Lobe	1797–1881			
Siegfried Dehn	1799–1858			
Auguste Barbereau	1799–1879			
Joseph d'Ortigue	1802–1866			
Henri Reber	1807–1880			
Carl Friedrich Weitzmann	1808–1880			
Ernst Friedrich Richter	1808–1879			
Alfred Day	1810–1849	A Treatise on Harmony		
George Alexander Macfarren	1813–1887			
Hermann von Helmholtz	1821–1894			
Anton Bruckner	1824–1896			
Frederick Arthur Gore Ouseley	1825–1889			
Rudolf Westphal	1826–1892			
François-Auguste Gevaert	1828–1908			
František Zdeněk Skuherský	1830–1892			
Salomon Jadassohn	1831–1902			
Heinrich Bellermann	1832–1903			
Arthur von Oettingen	1836–1920			
Ebenezer Prout	1835–1909			
Théodore Dubois	1837–1924			
John Stainer	1840–1901			
Bernhard Ziehn	1845–1912			
Otakar Hostinský	1847–1910			
Hugo Riemann	1849–1919			
Percy Goetschius	1853–1943			
Guido Adler	1855–1941	Umfang, Methode und Ziel der Musikwissenschaf (1885)		
Sergei Taneyev	1856–1915	Convertible Counterpoint in the Strict Style		
Ludwig Thuille	1861–1907	Harmonielehre (1907)	His textbook, written with Rudolf Louis, which analyzes music with an equal emphasis on vertical and horizontal harmony	

== 20th century – present ==
Name	Lifetime	Major writing	Known for	Ref(s)
Stephan Krehl	1864–1924	Kontrapunkt (1908)	Attempted to synthesize harmony and counterpoint	
André Gedalge	1868–1926	Traité de la fugue (1901)	Fugue theory	
Alfred Lorenz	1868–1939	Das Geheimnis der Form bei Richard Wagner (1924–1933)	Musical analysis, particularly of Richard Wagner's works	
Heinrich Schenker	1868–1935	Free Composition, Counterpoint, Harmony	Founding Schenkerian analysis	
August Halm	1869–1929	Die Symphonie Anton Bruckners (1914)	Musical analysis	
Suphi Ezgi	1869–1962	Nazarî ve Amelî Türk Müzikisi (1933–1953)		
Rauf Yekta	1871–1935	La musique turque (1922)		
Arnold Schoenberg	1874–1951	Style and Idea	Twelve-tone technique, Serialism	
Donald Tovey	1875–1940	Essays in Musical Analysis (1935–1939, 1944)	Musical analysis	
Julián Carrillo	1875–1965	Sonido 13 (1948)	The Sonido 13 theory	
Arnold Schering	1877–1941			
Boleslav Yavorsky	1877–1942			
Zdeněk Nejedlý	1878–1962			
Hüseyin Sadeddin Arel	1880–1955	Türk Musikisi Kimindir?	The nationalist school of Ottoman classical music	
Rudolph Reti	1885–1957	The Thematic Process in Music (1951)	Musical analysis	
Ernst Kurth	1886–1946			
Charles Seeger	1886–1979		formulation of dissonant counterpoint	
Adele T. Katz	1887–1979	"Heinrich Schenker's Method of Analysis" (1935)	Schenkerian analysis	
Iurii Nikolaevich Tiulin	1893-1978			
Nicolas Slonimsky	1894–1995	Thesaurus of Scales and Melodic Patterns (1947)		
Paul Hindemith	1895–1963	Unterweisung im Tonsatz [The Craft of Musical Composition]		
Joseph Schillinger	1895–1943	The Schillinger System of Musical Composition (1941)	System of music composition	
Howard Hanson	1896–1981	Harmonic Materials of Modern Music: Resources of the Tempered Scale (1960)	Nascent development of set theory	
Erwin Ratz	1898–1973	Einführung in die musikalische Formenlehre [Introduction to Musical Form]	Musical analysis of form and structure	
Felix Salzer	1904–1986			
Lev Abramovich Mazel'	1907–2000	O melodii (1952)	Elements of music; among the founders of the Soviet/Russian music theory tradition	
Ernst Oster	1908–1977	English translation of Free Composition	Schenkerian analysis	
George Perle	1915–2009	Serial Composition and Atonality (1962)	Methods of atonality	
Milton Babbitt	1916–2011	Numerous; "Some Aspects of Twelve-Tone Composition" (1955); "Twelve-Tone Invariants as Compositional Determinants" (1960); and "Set Structure as a Compositional Determinant" (1961)	Serialism	
Edward T. Cone	1917–2004	Musical Form and Musical Performance (1968)	Musical analysis	
Muḥammad Ṣalāḥ al-Dīn	1917–1965	Taṣwīr al-Alḥān al-‘Arabiyyah (1950) [The transposition of Arab melodies]	Division of the octave into 24 quarter tones, transposition of the Arabic maqam	
Rostislav Berberov	1921–1984	Spetsifika strukturï khorovogo proizvedeniya ('Specifics of the Structure of a Choral Work', Moscow, 1981) and Ėpicheskaya poėma’ Germana Galïnina: estetiko-analisticheskiye pazmïshleniya ('The Epic Poem of German Galïnin: Aesthetic-Analytic Reflections', Moscow, 1986)	Leading Soviet theorist who create a complex yet structurally integrated system of music analysis that was built on combining theories developed by Ernst Kurth, Boris Asafyev, Hugo Riemann, and Johannes Bobrowski.	
Iannis Xenakis	1922–2001	Formalized Music (1963)	Writing on music composition based on math	
George Russell	1923–2009	Lydian Chromatic Concept of Tonal Organization (1953)	Pioneering music theory systems centered around jazz	
Jaroslav Volek	1923–1989			
Ernő Lendvai	1925–1993	Bartók's Style (1955)	Musical analysis, particularly of Béla Bartók's works, such as with the axis system	
Allen Forte	1926–2014	Tonal Harmony (1962)	Musical analysis, Schenkerian analysis and set theory	
William Ennis Thomson	1927–2019	"Pitch Frames as Melodic Archetypes" (2006)	Cognitive and perceptual foundations of music	
Wallace Berry	1928–1991	Structural Functions in Music (1976); Musical Structure and Performance (1989)	Musical analysis, particularly on formal structure	
Harold Powers	1928–2007	Mode and Raga (1958); "Mode" in Grove 1980	Comparisons of the Western and Indian classical traditions, particularly on modes and ragas. Also research on the use of musical theory to convey drama in Italian opera	
Carl Schachter	born 1932	Harmony and Voice Leading (1979; with Edward Aldwell)	Schenkerian analysis	
David Lewin	1933–2003	Generalized Musical Intervals and Transformations (1987)	Transformational theory	
Benjamin Boretz	born 1934	Language as a Music: Six Marginal Pretexts for Composition (1981)		
Robert Porter Morgan	born 1934	Anthology of Twentieth-Century Music (1992)	Musical analysis of 20th-century classical music	
Edward Aldwell	1938–2006	Harmony and Voice Leading (1979; with Carl Schachter)		
Edward Laufer	1938–2014		Schenkerian analysis	
Stefan Kostka	born 1939	Tonal Harmony (1984)		
Fred Lerdahl	born 1943	A Generative Theory Of Tonal Music (1983; with Ray Jackendoff)	Generative theory of tonal music	
Maury Yeston	born 1945	Readings in Schenker Analysis (1975); The Stratification of Musical Rhythm (1976)	Rhythmic stratification and Schenkerian analysis	
James Hepokoski	born 1946	Elements of Sonata Theory (2006; with Warren Darcy)	Sonata theory	
William Caplin	born 1948	Classical Form (1998)	Analysis of classical period music	
Willie Anku	1949–2010	"Circles and time: a theory of structural organisation of rhythm in African music" (2000)	Studies on African rhythm, particularly using set theory	
Laurence Dreyfus	born 1952		Analysis of the music of Bach	
Richard Cohn	born 1955	Audacious Euphony (2012)	Rhythm and atonal pitch-class theories	
Victor Kofi Agawu	born 1956	Playing with signs (1991); African Rhythm, A Northern Ewe Perspective (1995)	Musical semiotics and musical analysis	
Timothy L. Jackson	born 1958		Schenkerian analysis	
Miller Puckette	born 1959	The Theory and Technique of Electronic Music (2007)	Max (software), Pure Data	
Philip Ewell	born 1966	Music Theory and the White Racial Frame (2020)	Race in music, Russian and twentieth century music, as well as rap and hip hop	
Ellie Hisama		Gendering Musical Modernism: The Music of Ruth Crawford, Marion Bauer, and Miriam Gideon (2007)	Gender, race, and sexuality in music theory. Popular music	
Suzannah Clark	born 1969	Music theory and natural order from the Renaissance to the early twentieth century (2001)	Franz Schubert, history of music theory, medieval music	
Dmitri Tymoczko	born 1969	A Geometry of Music (2010)	Proposed framework for considering tonality	
