= Giovanni Battista Chiodini =

Italian Franciscan friar and writer

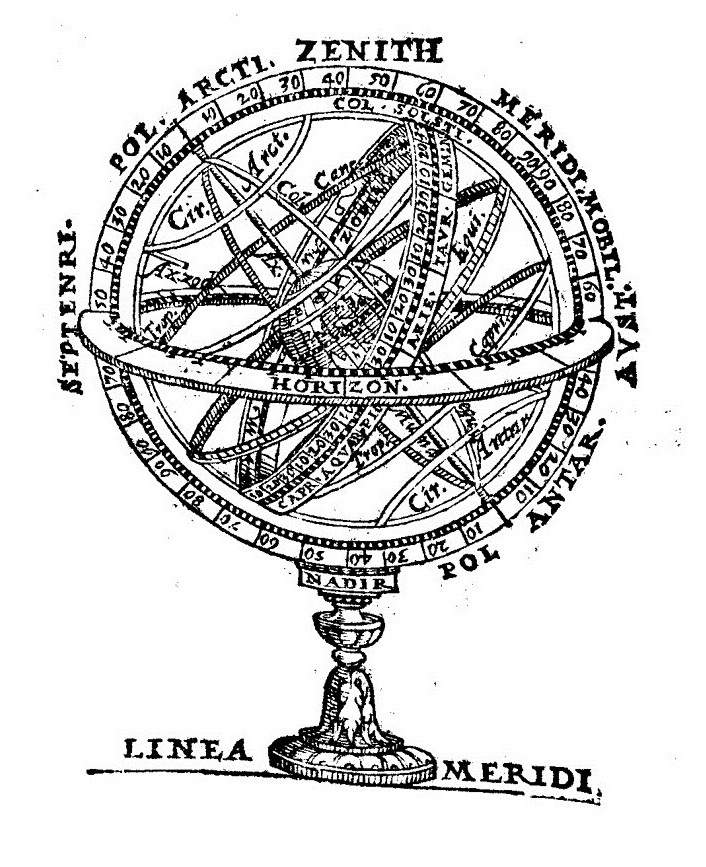
An illustration from Praxis sphaerica clarissima (1615)

Giovanni Battista Chiodini or Chiodino (died 1652) was an Italian Franciscan friar, music theorist, and writer.

A Conventual Franciscan and Inquisitor from Monte Milone (now Pollenza), he wrote about music theory (Arte pratica latina e volgare di far contrapunto, 1610), astronomy and mathematics (Praxis sphaerica clarissima, 1615), theology, philosophy and literature, and composed poems in Italian and Latin (La nobiltà burghesia romana, 1620).

His Arte pratica of 1610 was translated into German by Johann Andreas Herbst, and published as Arte prattica et poëtica, das ist: ein kurzer Unterricht, wie man einen Contrapunct machen und komponieren sol lernen in 1653.

== Biography ==
A native of Monte Milone (present-day Pollenza), he was a Order of Friars Minor Conventual and inquisitor.

He wrote about music theory (Arte pratica latina e volgare di far contrapunto, 1610),[3] astronomy and Mathematics (Praxis sphaerica clarissima, 1615), Theology, philosophy, and literature, and also composed poetry in Italian and Latin (La nobiltà burghesia romana, 1620).

His Practical Art was translated into German in 1653 by the composer Johann Andreas Herbst.

== Works ==
- Arte pratica latina et volgare di far contrapunto à mente, & à penna (in Latin and Italian). Venice: Ricciardo Amadino. 1610.
- Praxis sphaerica clarissima (in Latin). Venice: Ambrogio & Bartolomeo Dei. 1615.
- Pupilla phylosophiae Aristotelis (in Latin). Venice: Ambrogio Dei. 1617.
- Thalamus rationalis (in Latin). Venice: Pietro Farri. 1620.
- La nobiltà burghesia romana (in Italian and Latin). Macerata: Stamperia del Martellini. 1620.
