= Rostislav Berberov =

Rostislav Nikolayevich Berberov (March 28, 1921 — June 12, 1984) was a Russian music theorist and musicologist. He was one of the principal music theorists of the Soviet school of music analysis of the 20th century. He was also an expert on Pyotr Ilyich Tchaikovsky, writing several forwards included in the publications of that composer's works and editing the second volume of the complete collected works of Tchaikovsky, Polnoye sobraniye sochineniy (Moscow, 1950).

== Life and career ==
Born in Kondrovo, Berberov graduated from the Gnessin State Musical College before pursuing graduate studies in musicology at the Moscow Conservatory; matriculating to the latter institution in 1941. During the first semester of his studies, the Moscow Conservatory was evacuated to the Saratov Conservatory due to World War II, and both institutions merged for studies from 1941-1943. During this time, Berberov became a part of Boleslav Yavorsky's inner circle and the two developed a close friendship. Berberov was also a pupil of music theorist Lev Mazel.

While an excellent student who was highly proficient in his field, Berberov was denied a diploma by the Moscow Conservatory due to his unwillingness to endorse Marxism–Leninism as a political philosophy. Given his political ambivalence, he was denied access to taking his final exams. Nonetheless, he was hired to teach music theory on the faculty of the October Revolution Music College (now known as the Schnittke Moscow State Institute of Music) in 1947. He taught at that institution for the next ten years with no music degree, but was finally awarded his diploma in 1957. He left his position at the October Revolution Music College in 1970 when he was appointed a lecturer in music analysis at the Gnessin State Musical College.

In the 1960s Berberov created a complex yet structurally integrated system of music analysis that was built on combining theories developed by Ernst Kurth, Boris Asafyev, Hugo Riemann, and Johannes Bobrowski. This analytical tool analyzed individual works of music by looking at its temporal development and making differentiations between constructive and destructive elements of musical development. It also incorporated many elements from Riemannian theory in relation to musical motifs and phrase analysis. Some of his important publications in which he demonstrated his analytical methodology include Spetsifika strukturï khorovogo proizvedeniya (‘Specifics of the Structure of a Choral Work’, Moscow, 1981) and the monograph Ėpicheskaya poėma’ Germana Galïnina: estetiko-analisticheskiye pazmïshleniya (‘The Epic Poem of German Galïnin: Aesthetic-Analytic Reflections’, Moscow, 1986).

Berberov died in Moscow on June 12, 1984.
