= Boleslav Yavorsky =

Russian musicologist (1877–1942)

Boleslav Yavorsky Болеслав Яворский
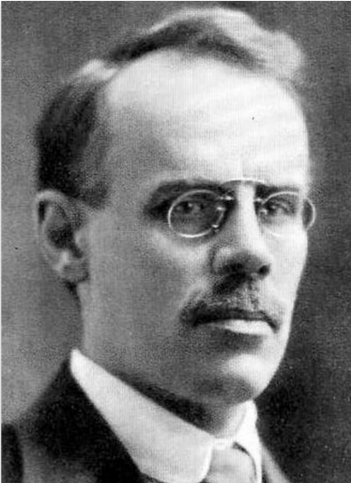

Background information
- Born: June 22, 1877; Kharkiv, Russian Empire
- Died: November 26, 1942 (aged 65) Saratov, Russian SFSR, Soviet Union
- Occupations: Musicologist, music teacher, administrator, pianist

Boleslav Leopoldovich Yavorsky (Note: Russian: Болеслав Леопольдович Яворский, romanized: Boleslav Leopoldovich Yavorsky; Ukrainian: Болеслав Леопольдович Яворський, romanized: Boleslav Leopoldovych Yavorskyi) (Note: In this name that follows East Slavic naming customs, the patronymic is Leopoldovich and the family name is Yavorsky.) (Russian: Болесла́в Леопо́льдович Яво́рский; 22 June 1877 – 26 November 1942) was a Soviet and Russian musicologist, music teacher, administrator, and pianist.

Through his teachings and editorial positions he heavily influenced Soviet music theory. However, outside Soviet circles, he has had little impact.

== Biography ==
Yavorsky was born in Kharkiv. He studied at the Moscow Conservatory under Sergei Taneyev and Karl Kipp. He taught at the Kiev Conservatory until 1919, the First Music Tekhnikum in Moscow, which he founded, and the Moscow Conservatory.

He chaired the music section of the People's Commissariat for Education (Narkompros) from 1922 to 1930.

Yavorsky was a friend, mentor and confidant of the composer Dmitri Shostakovich and played an important role in the latter's development. He often used his influence to further Shostakovich's career.

His students included Rostislav Berberov, Vladimir Aleksandrovich Dukelsky (also known as Vernon Duke), Alexei Fedorovich Kozlovsky, Alexander Abramovich Krein, Sergei Protopopov, Mykola Leontovych, Tatiana Grigorievna Shaborkina (director of the Scriabin Museum from 1941 until 1984), Maria Wiłkomirska, and Isaak Rabinovich, whose son Boleslav Rabinovich was named after Isaak's beloved teacher. Yavorsky died in Saratov.
