= Marco Scacchi =

Italian composer and writer

- Born: c. 1600; Gallese, Papal States
- Died: 7 September 1662 (aged 61–62); Gallese, Papal States
- Occupation: Composer

Marco Scacchi (c. 1600 – 7 September 1662) was an Italian composer and writer on music.

Born in Gallese, Lazio, Scacchi studied under Giovanni Francesco Anerio in Rome. He was associated with the court at Warsaw from 1626, and was kapellmeister there from 1628 to 1649. His 1643 treatise Cribrum musicum accused Paul Siefert of having poor technique, leading to a war of words which lasted years. He then returned to Italy after falling ill, where he concentrated on writing about music theory. Scacchi believed that each genre of music should have its own unique style, and he devised his own system of classifying works which proved influential on later generations; Angelo Berardi quoted him at length in his 1687 treatise Documenti armonici.

Scacchi was a prolific composer, who wrote masses, madrigals, and sacred concertos. Nearly all of his stage works have been lost. He died in Gallese.

== Theoretical works ==
- Cribrum musicum ad triticum Siferticum, seu Examinatio succinta psalmorum ... Venetiis: Alessandro Vincenti, 1643
- Lettera per maggiore informatione a chi leggerà il mio 'Cribrum' Venice, 1644; lost, survives in two manuscript transcriptions
- Judicium cribri musici Warsaw c1649; lost, manuscript transcription in the Civico Museo Bibliografico Musicale Giovanni Battista Martini, Bologna
- Breve discorso sopra la musica moderna, di Marco Scacchi romano, maestro di cappella del serenissimo & potentissimo Giovanni Casimiro rè di Polonia & Svetia, ... Warszawa: Peter Elert 1649
