= Ugolino of Forlì =

Italian music theorist and composer (c. 1380–1452)

Ugolino of Forlì (Italian: Ugolino da Forlì) or Ugolino of Orvieto (Italian: Ugolino da Orvieto; c. 1380 – c. 23–31 January 1452) was an Italian music theorist and composer of early Renaissance music.

== Life and career ==
Ugolino was born in Forlì, but was named Urbevetano (of Orvieto) because his father, Francesco, was from Orvieto. He died at Ferrara.

== Works ==
- Declaratio musicae disciplinae (five books), written during the beginning of his time in Ferrara.
