= Angelo Berardi =

Italian composer

- Born: c. 1636; Sant'Agata Feltria
- Died: 9 April 1694; Rome
- Occupation: Composer

Angelo Berardi (c. 1636 in Sant'Agata Feltria – 9 April 1694 in Rome) was an Italian music theorist and composer.

Berardi was born in Sant'Agata Feltria. He received early education at Forlì under Giovanni Vincenzo Sarti (1600–1655). From 1662 he was maestro di cappella in Montefiascone, in the province of Viterbo, Lazio. He studied under Marco Scacchi at Gallese at some time between 1650 and Scacchi's death in 1662; he included two motets by Scacchi in Book 1 of his Documenti armonici of 1687, and also cites him frequently. By 1667, when his Salmi vespertini concertati, Op. 4, were published, Berardi was maestro di cappella at the cathedral in Viterbo. He was organist and maestro di cappella at Tivoli from 21 September 1673 to 1679, and maestro di cappella and "professor of music" at the cathedral in Spoleto in 1681 or from 1679–1683. He was a canon at the collegiata of S. Angelo, Viterbo, when the Documenti armonici (1687) and Miscellanea musicale (1689) were published. By 17 August 1692 he was maestro di cappella at Santa Maria in Trastevere in Rome.

He died in Rome in 1694.

Berardi composed a significant body of work, mostly of a sacred nature, but he is better known for his writings on music theory and counterpoint. His first treatise, published in 1670 or in any case before 1681, has not survived, but is referred to in his Ragionamenti musicali (1681), which deals with the origins of music and the proliferation of musical styles. Both the Documenti armonici (1687) and the Miscellanea musicale (1689) discuss contemporary contrapuntal practices.

== Compositions ==
- Sinfonie a violino solo con basso continuo Libro primo Op. 7 (Bologna, 1670)
- 2 collections of two- to four-part sacred songs
- 4 collections of three- to six-part psalms
- about 20 masses
- chamber music for various forces

== Theoretical works ==
- Dicerie musicali, before 1681, lost
- Ragionamenti musicali composti dal Sig. Angelo Berardi ... dedicati all'illustriss. e reuerendiss. Sig. il Sig. abbate Carlo Antonio Sampieri da Giuseppe Orsolini luchese ... Bologna: Giacomo Monti 1681
- Aggiunta di D. Angelo Berardi, ... alli suoi ragionamenti musicali, nella quale si pruova, che la musica è vera, e reale scienza ... Bologna: Giacomo Monti 1681
- Documenti armonici di D. Angelo Berardi da S. Agata, canonico nell' insigne collegiata di S. Angelo di Viterbo, nelle quali con varii discorsi, regole, et essempii si dimostrano gli studi artificiosi della musica, oltre il modo di usare le ligature, e d'intendere il valore di ciascheduna figura sotto qual sia segno ... Bologna: Giacomo Monti 1687
- Miscellanea musicale di D. Angelo Berardi da S. Agata, canonico nell' insigne collegiata di S. Angelo di Viterbo, divisa in tre parti dove con dottrine si discorre delle materie più curiose della musica: con regole, et essempii si tratta di tutto il contrapunto con l'intreccio di bellissimi secreti per li professori armonici ... Bologna: Giacomo Monti 1689
- Arcani musicali svelati dalla vera amicitia ne' quali appariscono diversi studii artificiosi, molte osservazioni, e regole concernenti alla tessitura de' componimenti armonici, con un modo facilissimo per sonare trasportato Bologna: Pier-Maria Monti 1690
- Il perché musicale, overo staffetta armonica nella quale la ragione scioglie le difficoltà, e gli esempi dimostrano il modo d'isfuggire gli errori, e di tessere con artificio i componimenti musicali; opera del canonico D. Angelo Berardi da S. Agata ... Bologna: Pier-Maria Monti 1693
