= Sergei Protopopov =

Russian composer

Sergei Vladimirovich Protopopov (Russian: Серге́й Владимирович Протопопов; 2 April [O.S. 21 March] 1893, Moscow – 14 December 1954, Moscow) was a Russian avant-garde composer and music theorist.

== Life ==
After studying medicine at the Moscow University, he attended the Kiev Conservatory where he pursued studies of music with theorist Boleslav Yavorsky. He graduated in 1921 and started working as a conductor. During 1938–43, he taught at the Moscow University.

He was associated, as many composers of the Russian avant-garde, with the Association for Contemporary Music. Due to the ideological incompatibility of avant-garde with the contemporary regime supporting socialist realism, his works were mostly unknown following 1931.

== Works ==
Both in his compositions and in his teaching, Protopopov was a strong supporter of Yavorsky's theories of modal rhythm and tritone. He also maintained a close relationship with him. Protopopov's compositions include three piano sonatas and some vocal works with piano. The piano sonatas were strongly influenced by late Scriabin. Using simultaneously sounding semitones, he created a specific harmony. Technically, they are very demanding for the interpreter, as well as for the instrument—they employ full standard range of piano, sometimes going even beyond that. The piano sonatas are often notated in three staves, and for simplicity accidentals take effect only at the given note.

== List of works ==
=== Piano works ===
- Op. 1. Sonata No. 1
- Op. 5. Sonata No. 2
- Op. 6. Sonata No. 3

=== Works for voice and piano ===
- Op. 4. Dve skazky na narodnyy tekst
- Op. 7. Skazka o divnom gudochke
- Op. 8. Le Printemps de la vie
- Op. 10. 2 Songs
- Op. 11. 2 Love-Songs

=== Other works ===
- Op. 3. Des Lebens Frühling for voice and piano trio
- together with Yavorsky: 5 Folk songs for mixed choir
