= Ernst Kurth =

Swiss music theorist (1886–1946)

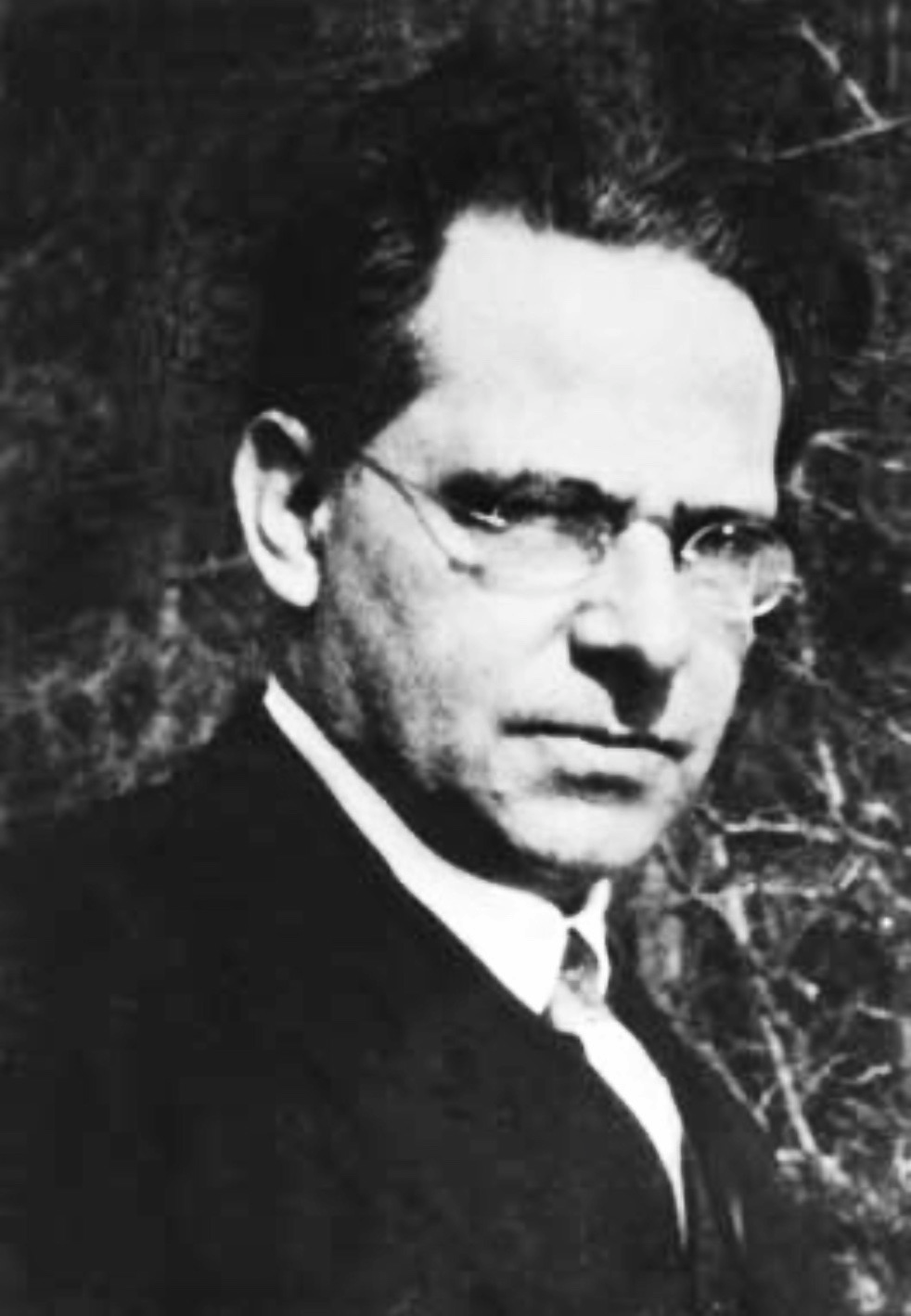
Ernst Kurth c. 1928

Ernst Kurth (1 June 1886 – 2 August 1946) was a Swiss music theorist of Austrian origin.

== Life and career ==
Ernst Kurth was born in Vienna on 1 June 1886. Kurth studied musicology there with Guido Adler (a student of Bruckner and Hanslick) at Vienna University and privately with Robert Gund, earning his Ph.D. (1908) with a thesis about Christoph Willibald Gluck's operatic style.

In a relatively short publishing career of about 15 years, Kurth wrote four enormously influential works: Grundlagen des Linearen Kontrapunkts (Foundations of Linear Counterpoint), Romantische Harmonik und ihre Krise in Wagners "Tristan" (Romantic Harmony and its Crisis in Wagner's "Tristan"), Bruckner, and Musikpsychologie. Since the 1940s, Kurth was gradually eclipsed by other theorists (notably Heinrich Schenker). However, his concept of "developmental motif" has remained influential. A developmental motif is one which gradually changes or grows, becoming a structural carrier of formal developments. An example is the triadic motif heard at the beginning of the first movement of Beethovens' third symphony which only becomes a closed theme at the culminating closing of the movement. Unfortunately, only a small selection of excerpts from Kurth's writings was translated into English by Lee A. Rothfarb.

Kurth died in Bern on 2 August 1946.

== Writings ==
- Der Stil der opera seria von Gluck bis zum Orfeo, (diss., U. of Vienna, 1908; published as Die Jugendopern Glucks bis Orfeo, SMw, i (1913), 193–277)
- Kritische Bemerkungen zum V. Kapitel der 'Ars cantus mensurabilis' des Franko von Köln, KJb, xxi (1908), 39–47
- Die Voraussetzungen der theoretischen Harmonik und der tonalen Darstellungssysteme (Habilitationsschrift, U. of Berne, 1912; Berne, 1913/R)
- Grundlagen des linearen Kontrapunkts: Einführung in Stil und Technik von Bachs melodischer Polyphonie (Berne, 1917, 5/1956/R)
- Zur Motivbildung Bachs, BJb 1917, 80–136
- Romantische Harmonik und ihre Krise in Wagners 'Tristan' (Berne, 1920/R, 2/1923/R; Russ. trans., 1975)
- Bruckner (Berlin, 1925/R)
- Die Schulmusik und ihre Reform, SMz, lxx (1930), 297–304
- Musikpsychologie (Berlin, 1931/R, 2/1947)
- Ernst Kurth: Selected Writings, ed. and trans. Rothfarb (New York, 1991)
