= Abdulbaki Nasir Dede =

Turkish composer

Şeyh Seyyid Abdülbâkî Nâsır Dede Efendi

Personal life
- Born: Abdülbâkî Efendi; August 7, 1765 Istanbul
- Died: February 23, 1821 (aged 55) Istanbul
- Parents: Şeyh Seyyid Ebûbekir Dede Efendi Kütâhiyyevî (father); Şerîfe Saîde Hanım (mother)
- Occupation: 15th Postnişin of the Yenikapı Mevlevî Lodge; composer, musicologist, poet, and translator

Religious life
- Religion: Islam
- Order: Mevlevi Order
- Sect: Sufism

Muslim leader
- Predecessor: Şeyh Seyyid Ali Nutkî Dede Efendi
- Successor: Şeyh Seyyid Receb Hüseyin Hüsnî Dede

Abdülbâkî Nâsır Dede was a composer from the Ottoman Empire. At the request of Selim III, Abdülbâkî authored the treatise Tedkîk-u Tahkîk (تدقيق و تحقيق; “Examination and Verification”), in which he outlined the distinguishing characteristics of 136 makams and 21 usuls, and transcribed and published the compositions of the sultan. Among Abdülbâkî Dede’s most notable works are his ayins in the Acembuselik, Isfahân, and Şevkitarap makams, as well as his translations of Menâḳıbü’l-ʿârifîn and Şerh-i Şâhidî. In another work, titled Tahrîrîye, he described the musical notation system he personally invented. He also created seven new makams: Dil-âvîz, Dil-dâr, Gül-ruh, Hisar-Kürdî, Rûh-efzâ, Nâz, and Niyâz, and devised a major usul consisting of twenty-two beats, which he named Şîrin.

He died in 1821 and was buried next to the Mevlevî Lodge at Yenikapı (Yenikapı Mevlevîhanesi), where he had served as both the Sheikh and the ser-nâyî (neyzenbaşı, chief of the ney performers).

== See also ==
- List of composers of classical Turkish music
