= Johann Andreas Herbst =

German composer (1588–1666)

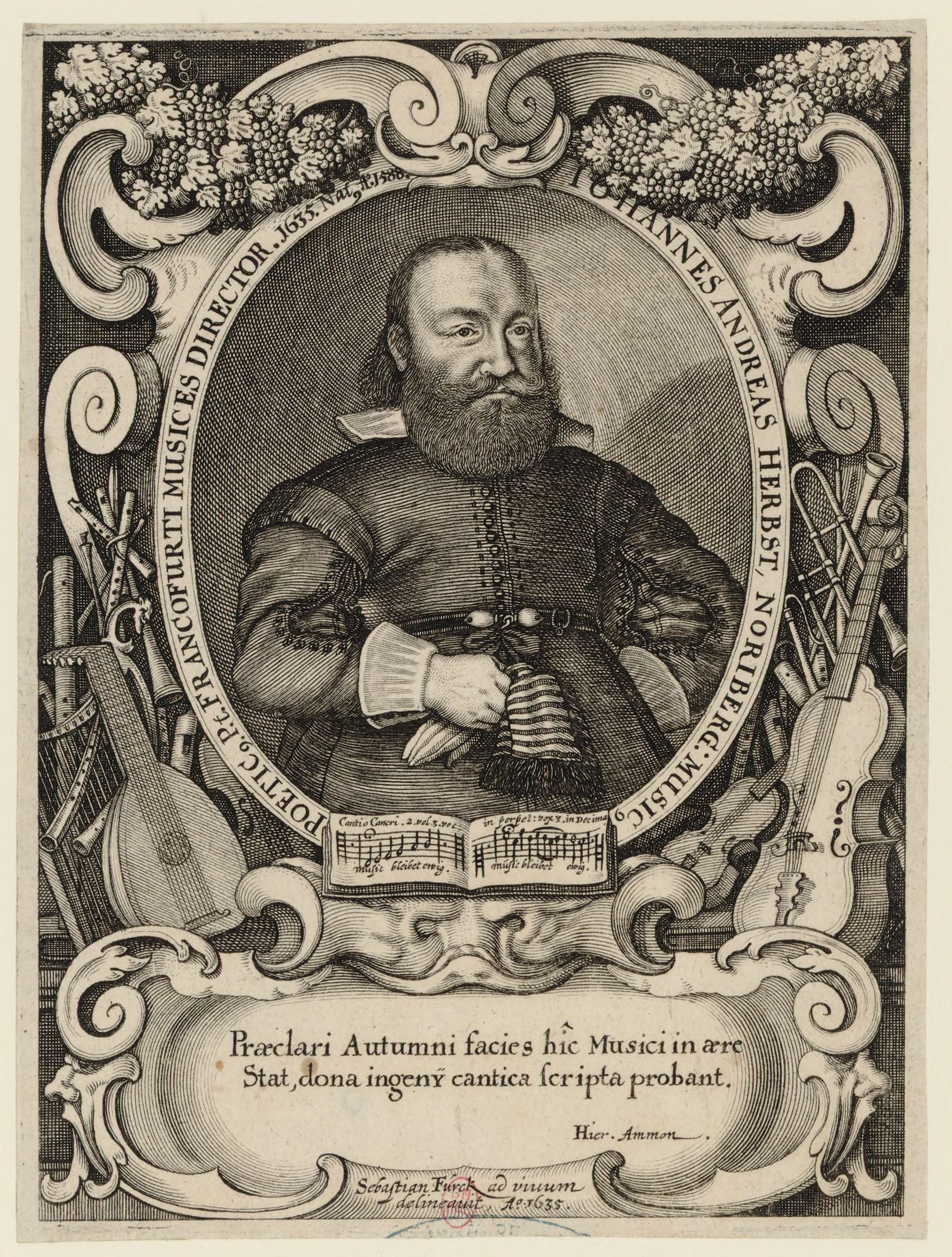
Johann Andreas Herbst. Portrait by Sebastian Furck (1635)

Johann Andreas Herbst (baptized June 9, 1588 – January 24, 1666) was a German composer and music theorist of the early Baroque era. He was a contemporary of Michael Praetorius and Heinrich Schütz, and like them, assisted in importing the grand Venetian style and the other features of the early Baroque into Protestant Germany.

== Life ==
He was born at Nuremberg, and most likely had his early education there. Possibly he studied with Hans Leo Hassler, one of the most prominent German composers at the turn of the century, since Hassler was teaching in Nuremberg while Herbst was a student, and there is a close stylistic relationship between the music of the two composers. Herbst became Kapellmeister at Butzbach in 1614, at Darmstadt in 1618, and at Frankfurt am Main in 1623.

In 1636 he accepted a position in Nuremberg, and returned to the city of his birth; it was evidently a frustrating appointment for him, for he wrote of his time there bitterly, and in 1644 he went back to Frankfurt, where he remained for the rest of his life. His most productive time was the period in Nuremberg and the second Frankfurt employment, during which he wrote his theoretical treatises and composed the bulk of his church music.

== Writings ==
Herbst was one of the most important German music theorists of the first half of the 17th century, second only to Michael Praetorius. Herbst's two books, Musica practica and Musica poetica, were hugely influential: except for the titles, they were in German, and covered many topics of practical importance to musicians. Musica practica was a manual on the art of singing, with particular care given to explaining the art of tasteful ornamentation; Musica poetica was a manual on the art of composition, and included exercises in counterpoint and in the careful setting of text to music. Parts of the first book, Musica practica, were drawn from the earlier treatise of Michael Praetorius, the Syntagma musicum.

Late in his career he published several translations of Latin musical writings in German, under the collected title of Arte prattica & poetica.

== Musical style and influence ==
Herbst wrote cantatas, chorales, chorale concertos, motets, psalm settings, and numerous other works, most of which were on sacred topics, and none of which were exclusively instrumental.

Some of his music uses the massive Venetian polychoral style, especially that written before the Thirty Years' War. During the war it became more and more difficult to find and employ the large numbers of musicians necessary for pieces in this style, and this trend towards simplification of instrumental forces can be seen in his music as well as that of his contemporaries.

His books of motets and his Teatrum amoris (meant to be in imitation of the Italian madrigal) avoid the continuo style then dominant in Italy, but otherwise Herbst uses many of the new Baroque era techniques which composers such as Hassler and Schütz brought back across the Alps from Venice. The stile concertato, with mixed groups of instruments and voices, is well-developed in Herbst's earlier music. The monodic style which was popular in Italy, and evident in the music of Schütz, along with its descendant, the recitative, is nowhere to be found in Herbst.

One of his last, and simplest, books of music is a collection of 29 chorales for five voices, which he published in 1659.

== References and further reading ==
- Article "Johann Andreas Herbst", in The New Grove Dictionary of Music and Musicians, ed. Stanley Sadie. 20 vol. London, Macmillan Publishers Ltd., 1980. ISBN 1-56159-174-2
- Manfred Bukofzer, Music in the Baroque Era. New York, W.W. Norton & Co., 1947. ISBN 0-393-09745-5
