= A. C. Greene =

American journalist and historian

- Born: Alvin Carl Greene Jr. November 4, 1923; Abilene, Taylor County; Texas, USA
- Died: April 5, 2002 (aged 78); Salado, Bell County, Texas
- Education: Abilene Christian College; University of Texas at Austin
- Occupations: Texas historian, author

A.C. Greene (born Alvin Carl Greene Jr.; 4 November 1923 – 5 April 2002) was an American writer – important in Texas literary matters as a memoirist, fiction writer, historian, poet, and influential book critic in Dallas. As a newspaper journalist, he had been a book critic and editor of the Editorial Page for the Dallas Times Herald when John F. Kennedy was assassinated, which galvanized his role at the paper to help untangle and lift a demoralized city in search of its soul. Leaving full-time journalism in 1968, Greene went on to become a prolific author of books, notably on Texas lore and history. His notoriety led to stints on radio and TV as a talk-show host. By the 1980s, his commentaries were being published by major media across the country. He had become a sought-after source for Texas history, anecdotes, cultural perspective, facts, humor, books, and politics. When the 1984 Republican National Convention was held in Dallas, Greene granted sixty-three interviews about Texas topics to major media journalists. Greene's 1990 book, Taking Heart – which examines the experiences of the first patient in a new heart transplant center (himself) – made The New York Times Editors Choice list.

== Career ==
In 1948, Greene began working as a cub reporter for the Abilene Reporter-News and wrote book reviews and articles for the entertainment section. From 1952 to 1957, Greene owned and operated the Abilene Book Store, located at 365 Cypress Street, across the street from the Paramount Theater – its slogan: "The Book Center of West Texas." In 1957, he began teaching journalism at Hardin-Simmons University.

Greene, in his teens, was known as "A.C." So, in 1953, he legally changed his name from Alvin Carl to A.C. and dropped the Jr.

In 1960, Greene became a book editor for the Dallas Times Herald; and in 1963, the Times Herald promoted him to the editor of the Editorial Page, a role he performed until 1965. Of the Kennedy assassination, Greene wrote:

Within a week after the assassination, everything that was sent to the editor or to the [Dallas] Times Herald came to me. We got literally thousands of letters from all over the world, especially from all over the United States, and a lot of them had money for Jacqueline Kennedy, but most of the money was for Officer Tippit's wife, and then Marina Oswald. From the Times Herald through me, from various readers all over the world, I sent Mrs. Tippit over $200,000. I sent Marina Oswald about the same amount.

Greene left the Times Herald in 1968 to pursue a Ph.D. at the University of Texas at Austin and to devote more time to writing books. From 1968 to 1969, Greene was the executive editor of the Southwestern Historical Quarterly, a publication of the Texas State Historical Association. In 1969, he served as President of the Texas Institute of Letters while working on his doctorate at The University of Texas at Austin.

In 1968, Greene was awarded a Dobie-Paisano Fellowship from the University of Texas at Austin which included a six-month stay at Paisano, a ranch 14 miles southwest of Austin purchased by J. Frank Dobie for use as a writer's retreat. The award and retreat led to Greene's first book, A Personal Country.

In the 1980s, Greene wrote a weekly column on Texas history for the Dallas Morning News.

From 1986 to 1992, Greene served as Founding Coordinating Director of the Center for Texas Studies at the University of North Texas in Denton. He retired as emeritus director. James Ward Lee – an author, professor of English at North Texas since 1958, former chairman of the English Department, and co-director of the center – called Greene "The Dean of Texas Letters."

Annually, Greene's hometown of Abilene, Texas presents the A.C. Greene Award to a distinguished Texas author for lifetime achievement during the West Texas Book Festival. Past winners include John Graves, Sandra Brown, Elmer Kelton, Liz Carpenter, John Erickson, and many others.

== Family ==
Greene's parents – Alvin Carl Greene Sr. (born in Wills Point, Texas, in 1902), and Johnnie Marie Cole (born in Beaumont, Teas, in 1906) – were killed in 1964 in a two-vehicle accident while traveling from Beaumont to Dallas. Their car had been hit by an 18-wheel truck U.S. 69.

Greene gave much credit for his love of reading, writing, and storytelling to his maternal grandmother, Maude E. Cole (1879–1961). Besides being a writer and poet, she was also an amateur painter. She was a prize-winning and published poet and author, and from 1926 to 1946, a librarian at the Carnegie Library in Abilene, Texas.

A.C. was married twice, first in 1950 to Betty Jo Dozier (1925–1989). They had three sons and a daughter. In 1989, Betty died from cancer. He subsequently remarried Judy Dalton Hyland (née Julia Hall Dalton; 1933–2012), daughter of the former governor of Missouri, John Montgomery Dalton. Through that marriage, he gained two stepdaughters. Judy died 8 August 2012 in Austin.

== Selected published works ==
=== Books (1st editions) ===
- A Personal Country. Illustrated by Ancel Edward Nunn (1st ed.). Knopf. 1969. OCLC 22512.
- The Last Captive (history: Herman Lehmann). Austin: Encino Press. 1972. OCLC 354470, 767992382.
- The Santa Claus Bank Robbery (1st ed.). Knopf. 1972. OCLC 279125.
- Dallas: The Deciding Years – A Historical Portrait. Austin: Encino Press. 1973. OCLC 898659, 500372131.
- A Christmas Tree. Drawings by Ancel Edward Nunn. Austin: Encino Press. 1973. OCLC 923314.
- Place Called Dallas: The Pioneering Years of a Continuing Metropolis. Dallas County Heritage Society. 1975. OCLC 607591181, 1915330.
- The Pleasantest Place: A History of Austin, Texas. Dallas: Mercantile Texas Corp. 1981. OCLC 7612648.
- The Highland Park Woman: A Collection of Short Stories. Bryan, Texas: Shearer Publishing Co. 1983. OCLC 9830309.
- Dallas U.S.A.. Texas Monthly Press. 1984. ISBN 9780932012838. OCLC 10302131.
- A Town Called Cedar Springs. Illustrated by Barbara Whitehead. Dallas: The Springs. 1984. OCLC 12858661.
- Texas Sketches. Illustrated by Paul Arthur Kolsti (1953–2003). Dallas: Taylor Publishing Company. 1985. OCLC 12551975.
- Taking Heart. Simon & Schuster. 1990. OCLC 21229155.
- 900 Miles on the Butterfield Trail. University of North Texas Press. 1994. OCLC 30510497.
- Christmas Memories. Illustrated by Geoffrey Greene. University of North Texas Press. 1996. OCLC 45733158.
- They are Ruining Ibiza (fiction). University of North Texas Press. 1998. OCLC 45732689.
- Sketches From the Five States of Texas. Texas A&M University Press. 1998. OCLC 38993108.
- Brandy Miracle. Somesuch Press, Dallas. 1998. OCLC 40925377.
- Chance Encounters: True Stories of Unforeseen Meetings With Unanticipated Results. Albany, Texas: Bright Sky Press. 2002. OCLC 48256753.

=== Literary criticism by Greene ===
- The Fifty Best Books on Texas. Dallas: Pressworks Publishing. 1982. OCLC 8832197, 659914169.
- The 50+ Best Books on Texas. University of North Texas Press. 1998. OCLC 44963275, 38043047, 779971345.

=== Poetry ===
- Memory of Snow: Poems. Dallas: Browder Springs Books. 2001. OCLC 47255254.

=== Stage plays, screenplays and opera ===
- The last captive: A Screenplay Manuscript (1991) OCLC 42386823
- A Cherished Design: The Creation of the University of Texas (1981)
- The Santa Claus Bank Robbery: A Screenplay (1989)
- One of the Pretty Ones: An Opera in Six Scenes (music score – manuscript). Music by Melvin Lucas Daniels, Jr., EdD, Libretto by A.C. Greene. Abilene Christian University. OCLC 54467542.

=== Oral histories ===
- Transcript: Dallas Mayors Oral history Project, No. 7, co-authored with Alan Mason, Oral History Program, East Texas State University OCLC 9870410

=== Selected articles ===
- Upwardly Mogul: Move Over, Hollywood. Make Way for Joe Camp. Joe Camp? Texas Monthly November 1976 pps. 141–145

== Manuscripts and papers ==
- A.C. Greene Papers, 1964–1997, bulk 1993–1994 University of Texas at Arlington Library
- A.C. Greene Papers 1967–1969, 1973 Southwestern Writers Collection The Wittliff Collections (Bill Wittliff was publisher of Encino Press) Albert B. Alkek Library Texas State University, San Marcos OCLC 32584946

== Awards and honors ==
=== Texas Institute of Arts and Letters ===
- 1964 – Inducted as a member
- 1964 – Co-winner, Stanley Walker Award for Best Newspaper Writing: No Life Is Lived Without Influence, The Dallas Times Herald
- 1969 – Fellow, Texas Institute of Letters & recipient of the Dobie Paisano Fellowship while studying at The University of Texas at Austin
- 1973 – Friends of the Dallas Public Library Award for Book Offering Most Significant Contribution to Knowledge: The Santa Claus Bank Robbery
- 1974 – Co-winner, Texas Collectors Institute Award for Best Book Design: A Christmas Tree, by A.C. Greene, illustrated by Ancell Nunn, designed by William D. Wittliff
- 1974 – Co-winner, Texas Collectors Institute Award for Best Book Design: Dallas, the Deciding Years, A Historical Portrait, by A.C. Greene, designed by William D. Wittliff
- 1987 – Lon Tinkle Award, for a distinguished career in letters associated with the State of Texas

=== Other awards and honors ===
- 1964 – Honoree as editor of the editorial page of the Dallas Times Herald and book editor, 12th Annual Southwest Journalism Forum, Press Club of Dallas Foundation, and the Southern Methodist University Department of Journalism
- 1990 – Fellow, Texas State Historical Association
- The University of North Texas Press, has a series of books named The A.C. Greene Series named in his honor for books on Texas and the Southwest
- A.C. Greene Award been presented annually in September 2001 to a distinguished Texas author for lifetime achievement. It is a feather of the West Texas Book Festival and is sponsored by Friends of the Abilene Public Library, the Abilene Reporter-News, and the Scripps Howard Foundation.
- Chautauqua Award for lifetime achievement in preserving history, Dallas County Heritage Society
- 1998 – Lifetime Achievement Award, Texas Book Festival, hosted by Laura Bush

== Formal education ==
- 1940 – Graduated from Abilene High School
- Attended Phillips University
- 1948 – Bachelor of Arts, Abilene Christian University
- 1968 – Did post-grad work at The University of Texas at Austin, towards a PhD
