= Kate Breakey =

Australian Photographer (born 1957)

- Born: 14 August 1957 (age 69); Port Lincoln, South Australia.
- Education: University of South Australia
- Known for: Contemporary Art
- Awards: Photographer of the Year, Houston Center for Photography

Kate Breakey (born August 14, 1957) is an Australian visual artist known for her large-scale, hand-colored photographs. Since 1981, her work has appeared in more than 75 solo exhibitions and more than 50 group exhibitions in the United States, France, Japan, Australia, China, and New Zealand. Her work is in the permanent collection of many public institutions including the Center for Creative Photography in Tucson, the Museum of Photographic Arts in San Diego, the Museum of Fine Arts, Houston, the Wittliff collections at Texas State University, the Austin Museum of Art, the National Gallery of Australia in Canberra and the Osaka Museum in Japan. In 2004, she received the Photographer of the Year Award from the Houston Center for Photography.

== Biography ==
Kate Breakey was born in Port Lincoln, South Australia on 14 August 1957. She achieved a Diploma in Graphic Design from the University of South Australia in 1978, and a Bachelor of Fine Art from the same university in 1981. In 1988, Breakey moved to Austin, Texas, where she completed a Master of Fine Art at the University of Texas in 1991, and where she taught photography in the university's Department of Art and Art History until 1997. In 1999, Breakey moved to Tucson, Arizona. In addition to participating in countless solo and group exhibitions, she is regularly invited to be a guest speaker and to teach throughout the U.S. and internationally.

== Public collections ==
- University of Colorado, Boulder, CO
- Tucson Museum of Art, Tucson, AZ
- Museum of Photographic Arts, San Diego, CA
- Harry Ransom Center, Photography Collection, The University of Texas at Austin, TX
- Center for Creative Photography, University of Arizona, Tucson, AZ
- Museum of Fine Arts, Houston, TX
- Austin Museum of Art, Austin, TX
- South Texas Institute for the Arts, Corpus Christi, TX
- Wittliff Gallery of Southwestern and Mexican Photography, Texas State University, San Marcos, TX
- University of South Australia, Adelaide, Australia
- Australian National Gallery, Canberra, Australia
- Art Gallery of New South Wales, Sydney, Australia
- Art Gallery of South Australia, Adelaide, Australia
- National Gallery of Victoria, Melbourne, Australia
- Osaka Museum, Osaka, Japan

== Solo exhibitions ==
- 2015 – Small Deaths, James A. Michener Art Museum, Doylestown, PA
- 2014 – Out of Darkness, Cattletrack Art Gallery, Phoenix, AZ
- 2014 – Au, Stephen L. Clark Gallery, Austin, TX
- 2013 – Heartland, Art Gallery of South Australia, Adelaide, Australia
- 2013 – Creatures of Light and Darkness, Temple of Music and Art Gallery, Tucson, AZ
- 2013 – Grasslands, Tucson Museum of Art, Tucson, AZ
- 2013 – Small Deaths, Mulvane Art Museum, Washburn University, Topeka, KS
- 2012 – Las Sombras/The Shadows, Stephen L. Clark Gallery, Austin, TX
- 2012 – Las Sombras/The Shadows, Wittliff Collection of Southwestern and Mexican Photography, Texas State University, San Marcos, TX
- 2012 – Painted Light, Goodwin Fine Art, Denver, CO
- 2011 – Slow Light, Etherton Gallery, Tucson, AZ
- 2011 – Painted Light, McMurtrey Gallery, Houston, TX
- 2010 – New Work 2010, Stephen L. Clark Gallery, Austin, TX
- 2010 – Painted Light, Wittliff Collection of Southwestern and Mexican Photography, Texas State University, San Marcos, TX
- 2010 – Kate Breakey, Longview Museum of Fine Arts, Longview, TX
- 2009 – Poetics of Light, Etherton Gallery, Tucson, AZ
- 2009 – Mexico – Pueblo y Jardin, Stephen L. Clark Gallery, Austin, TX
- 2009 – Las Sombras/ The Shadows, Stephen L. Clark Gallery, Austin, TX
- 2009 – Light Quartet: Themes and Variations, See+ Gallery, Beijing, China
- 2008 – Loose Ends, Stephen L. Clark Gallery, Austin, TX
- 2008 – Kate Breakey, A Natural Investigation, Gallery in the Garden, Tucson Botanic Gardens, Tucson, AZ
- 2008 – Small Deaths, University of Colorado, Boulder, CO
- 2007 – Elegant Wisdoms, Etherton Gallery, Tucson, AZ
- 2007 – Kate Breakey, Painted Photographs, Joseph Bellows Gallery, San Diego, CA
- 2007 – New Work, Stephen L. Clark Gallery, Austin, TX
- 2007 – Small Deaths, Art Museum of South Texas, Corpus Christi, TX
- 2007 – Stilled Lives, Catherine Edelman Gallery, Chicago, IL
- 2006 – Memories and Dreams, Stephen L. Clark Gallery, Austin, TX
- 2006 – Issues and Arrangements, Etherton Gallery, Tucson, AZ
- 2006 – Wildflowers, Tohono Chul Gallery, Tucson, AZ
- 2005 – Kate Breakey, photo-eye Gallery, Santa Fe, NM
- 2005 – Small Deaths, Galerie MC, Atlanta, GA
- 2005 – Photographs, McMurtrey Gallery, Houston, TX
- 2005 – New Work, Stephen L. Clark Gallery, Austin, TX
- 2004 – Kate Breakey, Segura Art, Mesa, AZ
- 2004 – Small Deaths, Tucson Museum of Art, Tucson, AZ
- 2004 – New Work, Stephen L. Clark Gallery, Austin, TX
- 2004 – Kate Breakey, Art Museum of South East Texas, Beaumont, TX
- 2004 – Remembrances, Catherine Edelman Gallery, Chicago, IL
- 2004 – Kate Breakey Photographs, McMurtrey Gallery, Houston, TX
- 2003 – Stilleven, Gerald Peters Gallery, Dallas, TX
- 2003 – Kate Breakey, Mainsite Contemporary Art, Norman, OK
- 2003 – Firsthand: Evocations of Figure and Form, Etherton Gallery, Tucson, AZ
- 2003 – Still Life, Stephen L. Clark Gallery, Austin, TX
- 2002 – Resurrection: the floral images of Kate Breakey, Segura Art, Mesa, AZ
- 2002 – Small Deaths, Flinders University Art Museum, Adelaide, South Australia
- 2002 – The Image Chamber, Flora, Fauna, Fact and Dream, Etherton Gallery, Tucson, AZ
- 2001 – Kate Breakey, Photographs, McMurtrey Gallery, Houston, TX
- 2001 – Small Deaths, Stephen L. Clark Gallery, Austin, TX
- 2001 – Small Deaths, Wittliff Collection of Southwestern and Mexican Photography, Texas State University, San Marcos, TX
- 2001 – Recent Work, Stephen L. Clark Gallery Austin, TX
- 2001 – Hand painted photograph, Parchman Stremmel Gallery, San Antonio, TX
- 2001 – Small Deaths, Julie Saul Gallery, NY, NY
- 2000 – Naturagraphia, Temple of Music and Art Gallery, Etherton Gallery, Tucson, AZ
- 2000 – The Nature of Things, Stephen L. Clark Gallery, Austin, TX
- 2000 – Memento Mori, Paul Kopeikin Gallery, Los Angeles, CA
- 1999 – Flora and Fauna, John Michael Kohler Arts Center, Sheboygan, WI
- 1999 – Small Deaths, Joseph Bellows Gallery, La Jolla, CA
- 1999 – 12 Flowers, Stephen L. Clark Gallery, Austin, TX
- 1998 – Photoworks, Wittliff Collection of Southwestern and Mexican Photography, South West Texas State University, TX
- 1998 – Slow Light, Stephen L. Clark Gallery, Austin, TX
- 1998 – Small Deaths, Rudolph Poissant Gallery, Fotofest, Houston, TX
- 1997 – Kate Breakey, Small Deaths, Galveston Art Center, Galveston, TX
- 1994-5 – Laws of Physics – Principles of Mathematics, New Zealand International Festival of Arts, Wellington, New Zealand
- 1994-5 – Laws of Physics – Principles of Mathematics, Adelaide Festival Centre Artspace Gallery, Adelaide, Australia
- 1994-5 – Laws of Physics – Principles of Mathematics, Centre for Contemporary Photography, Melbourne, Australia
- 1992 – Laws of Physics, American Association for the Advancement of Science's Art of Science and Technology Program, Atrium Gallery AAAS, Washington, DC
- 1989 – Portraits of South Australian Aborigines, Flinders University Art Museum, Adelaide, Australia
- 1988 – Encounters 1, South Australian School of Art Gallery, Adelaide, Australia
- 1988 – Portraits of South Australian Aborigines, South Australian Touring Exhibition, Australia
- 1987 – Portraits of South Australian Aborigines, Festival Theatre Foyer, Adelaide, Australia
- 1986 – Scientists, Life-Sized Portraits, Festival Theatre Gallery, Adelaide, Australia
- 1984 – Painted Photos, The Photographers' Gallery, Melbourne, Australia
- 1984 – Painted Photos, Australian Centre for Photography, Sydney, Australia
- 1982 – Painted Photos, The Developed Image Gallery, Adelaide, Australia

== Selected group exhibitions ==
- 2016 – ART + SCIENCE, Contemporary Arts Center, Las Vegas, NV
- 2014 – Without and Within: Photographs by Keith Carter and Kate Breakey, Etherton Gallery, Tucson, AZ
- 2014 – New Acquisitions, Wittliff Collection of Southwestern and Mexican Photography, Texas State University, San Marcos, TX
- 2013 – Mexico Lindo, Wittliff Collection of Southwestern and Mexican Photography, Texas State University, San Marcos, TX
- 2013 – Lies That Tell the Truth: Magic Realism in Contemporary Art, Indiana State University Art Gallery, Terre Haute, IN
- 2013 – Twentieth Anniversary Show (with Henri Cartier-Bresson, Keith Carter, James Evans, Jack Spencer, Rick Williams, Bill Wittliff), Stephen L. Clark Gallery, Austin, TX
- 2008 – The Texas Chair Project, Austin Museum of Art, Austin, TX
- 2007 – Latent Image, Mesa Contemporary Arts Center, Mesa, AZ
- 2006 – A Little More Red, McMurtrey Gallery, Houston, TX
- 2006 – Arts Botanica, Loyola University Museum of Art, Chicago, IL
- 2006 – Magical Realism, Art Gallery of NSW, Sydney, Australia

== Awards ==
- 2012 – Tucson Weekly Annual Best of Tucson Awards, Best Photographer
- 2012 – Texas Association of Museums Mitchell A. Wilder Award for Excellence in Publication and Media Design (for Las Sombras/The Shadows)
- 2011 – Texas Association of Museums Mitchell A. Wilder Award, Gold Award (for Painted Light)
- 2002 – Texas Association of Museums Mitchell A. Wilder Award for Excellence in Publication and Media Design (for Small Deaths)
- 2004 – Houston Center for Photography, Photographer of the Year
- 2002 – Oscart Awards (Adelaide, Australia), Best Photography
- 2002 – Arts SA Returning Artist Residency Grant
- 1999 – Tokyo International Photo-Biennale, Olympus Japan Co Award
- 1990 – Marian Royal Kazen Endowed Presidential Scholarship in Art
- 1991 – University of Texas Merit Award Scholarship
- 1990 – University of Texas Merit Award Scholarship
- 1989 – University of Texas Merit Award Scholarship
- 1988 – The International Forestry Conference for the Australian Bicentenary Jurors Award
- 1978 – Adelaide Advertiser Prize, Outstanding Design Student
- 1977 – Adelaide Art Engravers Award, Outstanding Graphic Design Student

== Books ==
- Las Sombras/The Shadows. Breakey, Kate. University of Texas Press, Wittliff Collection series, Austin, TX 2012. ISBN 978-0292744202
- Slow Light. Breakey, Kate. Etherton Gallery, Tucson, AZ 2011. ISBN 978-0976950837
- Painted Light. Breakey, Kate. University of Texas Press, Austin, TX 2010. ISBN 978-0292723191
- Flowers/Birds. Breakey, Kate. Eastland Books, 2002. ISBN 978-0972549202
- Small Deaths: Photographs. Breakey, Kate (introduction by A. D. Coleman). University of Texas Press, Wittliff Gallery Series, Austin, TX 2001. ISBN 978-0292709010
- Our Backyard. Swearer, Randolph and Breakey, Kate. Lupine Industries, 1994. ISBN 978-0964192409
