= Decatonic scale =

Ten note musical scale

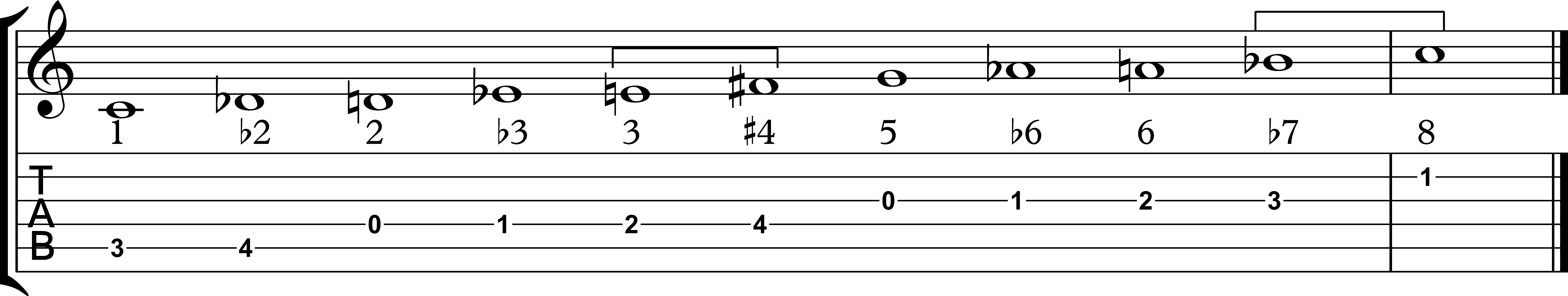
Four-semitone tritone scale

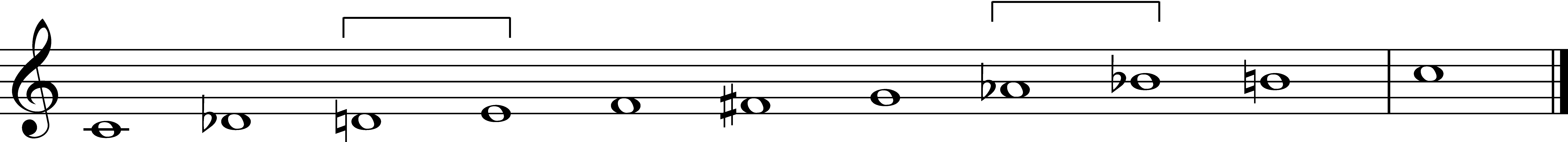
Symmetrical decatonic scale: "symmetric pattern [between steps] ½–½–1–½–½|½–½–1–½–½"

A decatonic scale is a ten note musical scale. If the notes are ordered, a decatonic set has 3,628,800 permutations, however, in twelve tone equal temperament only six unordered ten note sets exist, 10-1—10-6:

1. (all pitch classes but t & e)
2. (all but 9 & e)
3. (all but 8 & e)
4. (all but 7 & e)
5. (all but 6 & e)
6. (all but 5 & e)

Given that two of the notes from the chromatic scale are missing and only two whole tones are possible, all 10-note scales are cohemitonic scales.

Four-semitone tritone scale/Messiaen's 7th mode

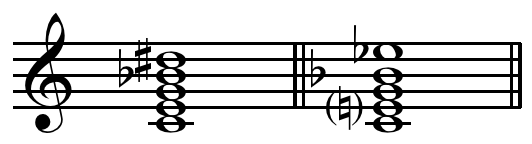
Dominant seventh raised ninth vs. dominant seventh split third chord.

The four-semitone tritone scale (set 10-6) is a decatonic scale consisting of four semitones, a whole tone, four semitones, and a whole tone (four semitones a tritone apart): 0,1,2,3,4,6,7,8,9,10. This may be related to the seven notes of the diatonic scale as, "1 ♭2 ♮2 ♭3 ♮3 ♯4 ♮5 ♭6 ♮6 ♭7," and thus spelled, on C, as C, D♭, D♮, E♭, E♮, F♯, G, A♭, A♮, B♭. This is a mode of Olivier Messiaen's seventh mode of limited transposition; it has six transpositions, like the tritone, and five modes (the same pitch classes with C, D♭, D, E♭, or E taken as the first scale step or tonic). This allows a dominant seventh chord to be built upon the tonic and a seventh sharp nine chord, and allows the tonic chord to have an altered ninth, eleventh, and thirteenth factors. However, pitch sets containing more than seven notes become increasingly similar to each other.

A decatonic scale that has been used or considered by Kyle Gann and La Monte Young in 13-limit just intonation is 1/1, 12/11, 32/27, 9/7, 4/3, 132/91, 3/2, 18/11, 16/9, 176/91, and 2/1.
