= Counterpoint (Schenker) =

Volume written by Heinrich Schenker

Counterpoint (Kontrapunkt in the original German) is the second volume of Heinrich Schenker's New Musical Theories and Fantasies (the first is Harmony and the third is Free Composition). It is divided into two "Books", the first published in 1910, and the second in 1922.

The subject matter of the work is species counterpoint. Book I is concerned with the construction of the cantus firmus and the rules of counterpoint in two voices, also referred to as "strict counterpoint"; Book II treats the cases of three- and four-voice counterpoint. Schenker thus follows the model of Fux in presenting all of the species in turn before adding additional voices.

== The Principles ==
The principles of strict counterpoint constitute one of the fundamental components of Schenker's musical theory (see Schenkerian analysis). For Schenker, the study of counterpoint is the study of voice leading; in particular, contrapuntal theory is separate from and independent of harmonic theory, which is concerned with scale-steps (see Harmony). In "free composition" (Schenker's term for actual music, as opposed to theoretical exercises), both of these two kinds of phenomena interact, together with the principle of repetition that he already stressed in his first important publication, in 1895. Schenker thus views the rules of strict counterpoint as basic structures underlying the complex voice-leading patterns of free composition, and not necessarily as models to be literally imitated on the actual musical surface. Throughout Counterpoint, Schenker cites examples from the musical literature to demonstrate the highly varied ways in which the principles of strict counterpoint can be applied in free composition.

As in his other works, Schenker is highly critical in Counterpoint of many of his theoretical predecessors, and of pedagogical methods then (and still) prevalent. In particular, he opposes the idea (promulgated by Riemann and others) that the purpose of contrapuntal studies is to acquire the skill of creating polyphonic textures in works of free composition (e.g. the writing of inventions and fugues). Rather, on Schenker's view, counterpoint (the "pure theory of voice-leading") is entirely distinct from the "theory of composition", just as it is also distinct from the theory of scale-steps, or harmony. It is of interest to note that, although many of Schenker's ideas have had a widespread influence on present-day music theorists, his views on pedagogy and the nature of contrapuntal studies have not prevailed: the word "counterpoint", as used in most universities and conservatories, continues to refer to courses that teach the student to imitate Renaissance or Baroque musical surfaces, and "harmony" courses continue to be concerned with exercises in voice-leading.

== Translations and Editions ==
Counterpoint, transl. J. Rothgeb and J. Thym, of the original published by Universal, Vienna, 1910 and 1922. Schirmer Books, 1987 ISBN 9780028732206

Counterpoint, republication. Musicalia Press, 2001 ISBN 9780967809908
