= Heinrich Schenker =

Austrian music theorist (1868–1935)

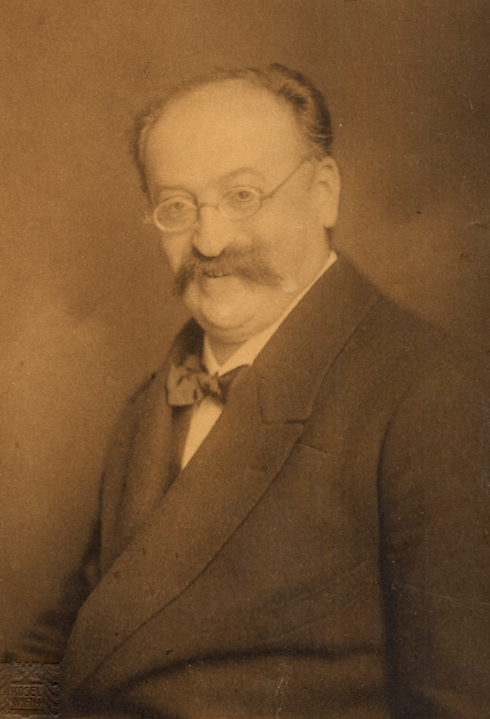
- Schenker in 1912
- Born: 19 June 1868; Wiśniowczyk, Austria-Hungary (now Vyshnivchyk, Ukraine)
- Died: 14 January 1935 (aged 66); Vienna, Austria
- Occupation: Music theorist
- Known for: Schenkerian analysis

Heinrich Schenker (19 June 1868 – 14 January 1935) was an Austrian music theorist whose writings have had a profound influence on subsequent musical analysis. His approach, now termed Schenkerian analysis, was most fully explained in a three-volume series, Neue musikalische Theorien und Phantasien (New Musical Theories and Phantasies), which included Harmony (1906), Counterpoint (1910; 1922), and Free Composition (1935).

Born in Wiśniowczyk, Austrian Galicia, he studied law at University of Vienna and music at what is now the University of Music and Performing Arts Vienna where his teachers included Franz Krenn, Ernst Ludwig, Anton Bruckner, and Johann Nepomuk Fuchs. Despite his law degree, he focused primarily on a musical career following graduation, finding minimal success as a composer, conductor, and accompanist. After 1900 Schenker increasingly directed his efforts toward music theory, developing a systemic approach to analyze the underlying melodic and harmonic material of tonal music. His theories proposed the presence of fundamental structures (Ursatz) occurring in the background (Hintergrund) of compositions, which he illustrated with a variety of new specialized terms and notational methods.

Schenker's view on race has come under scrutiny and criticism in the 21st century.

== Early years and education ==
Heinrich Schenker was born in Wiśniowczyk, Austrian Galicia in 1868 to a Jewish family of Johann Schenker and his wife, Julia (née Mosler). Schenker's father was a doctor who had been allowed to settle in Wiśniowczyk, a village of only 1,759 inhabitants, according to the 1869 census. There is very little information about Schenker's parents. Moriz Violin, Schenker's life-long friend recalled Schenker describing "the seriousness of the father and the hot temper of the mother".

Schenker was the fifth of six children: Markus (allegedly died 1880 in Lemberg); Rebeka (allegedly died 1889 in Gradiska); Wilhelm, a doctor; Schifre; and Moriz (Moses), born 31 August 1874. There is little documentation concerning Schenker's childhood years. Schenker himself said nothing about his secondary-school education. His musical instincts must have been discovered at an early age, for he went to Lemberg (present-day Lviv, Ukraine) and studied with Carl Mikuli and then continued his studies in Berezhany.

Schenker received a scholarship to move to Vienna, where his family followed. Documents at the University of Vienna show him on the roster at the beginning of the 1884/85 season, where he pursued a law degree. In addition to his studies at the University of Vienna, he was enrolled at the Konservatorium of the Gesellschaft der Musikfreunde (today, the University of Music and Performing Arts, Vienna) from 1887 through 1890. His entrance examination results indicate that he initially studied composition with Franz Krenn and piano with Ernst Ludwig. Schenker and his father asked that he be exempted from the first year's fees. Other documents indicate that in his first year, Schenker majored in harmony under Anton Bruckner. Schenker's father died in 1887, leaving the family destitute.

Carl Flesch, also in attendance at the Konservatorium, left a description of Schenker as a student "who seemed half-starved, and who towered far above the rest of us ... It was Heinrich Schenker, who later came to enjoy high esteem for his original musical theories and his all-embracing practical and theoretical musicality."

Schenker's negative feelings toward Bruckner are revealed in a quote in his Harmony (1906, written nearly twenty years after instruction), in which he stated that "If the teacher is unable to explain his own propositions ..., the student ... may be content not to understand the proffered doctrine ... The teacher closes his classes in harmony; he closes his classes in counterpoint, finishes them off in his own way; but not even the first step toward art has been taken." A footnote adds "My teacher, a composer of high renown [Bruckner, obviously], used to say on such occasions: Segn's, mein' Herrn, dass ist die Regl, i schreib' natirli not a so." In Counterpoint, vol. I, Schenker quotes examples from Bruckner's works as examples of badly constructed lines. Schenker had better memories of Ernst Ludwig. Ludwig accepted Schenker on the basis of his initial scholarship. Upon seeing some of Schenker's musical compositions, Ludwig recommended them to the pianist Julius Epstein. Ludwig sent students to study with Schenker, who remembered him fondly and thought he would have appreciated his Harmonielehre and Kontrapunkt.

In the 1888–89 season, Schenker studied counterpoint under Bruckner and continued piano study under Ludwig, always receiving the highest grades. The following season, Schenker joined the composition class of Johann Nepomuk Fuchs. He graduated on 20 November 1889 and was charged only half the fee for the school year (the fee paid by Ludwig Bösendorfer).

== Composer and performer ==
After graduating the University of Vienna with a law degree, Schenker devoted himself entirely to music. His first major opportunity came with Maximilian Harden, editor of Die Zukunft [The Future] who published his earliest writings. Publications in other periodicals followed. Surviving letters in Schenker's archive suggest that during his schooling Schenker had no income and survived purely by gifts from supporters. He continued this practice after graduating. Schenker dedicated his Inventions op. 5 to Irene Graedener (maiden name Mayerhofer). On her death (9 August 1923), he recalled in his diary that it was at her house that he was able to find himself and realize his future calling. At this point in his career, Schenker saw himself primarily as a composer and tried to ingratiate himself as a means of promoting his compositions. Several letters attest to his meetings with Eduard Hanslick.

By 1900, Schenker was actively trying to promote his musical compositions as evidenced by correspondence with Ignaz Brüll, Karl Goldmark, Eugen d'Albert and Ferruccio Busoni. The dedications of his published compositions are another clue to the identities of those who were sympathetic and possibly gave money to enable Schenker's works to be published, although there were probably more compositions than those conserved in the Oswald Jonas Memorial Collection at the University of California at Riverside. His Op. 1 carries a dedication to Julius Epstein, Op. 2 is dedicated to Ferruccio Busoni, Op. 4 is dedicated to Eugen d'Albert. D'Albert had promised to play some of Schenker's works, and Busoni was particularly enthusiastic about the Fantasy, Op. 2. With letters from d'Albert, Brüll, Busoni, and Detlev von Liliencron, Schenker felt confident in promoting his compositions. Correspondence indicates that Schenker was in contact with Max Kalbeck, as the latter was trying to make introductions for him. Similar patronage is evidenced by the dedication on the Syrian Dances (without opus number), dedicated to Baron Alphonse de Rothschild. At Busoni's insistence, the dances were orchestrated by Arnold Schoenberg and played on 5 June 1903, the ensemble led by Busoni.

The publication of Schenker's Vorüber Op. 7, no. 3, in a collection sponsored by the Wiener Singakademie attests to a friendship between composer and the organization's conductor, Carl Lafite.

In the final decade of the 19th century, Schenker was also active on the concert stage. He did not give solo recitals but participated as an accompanist or participant in chamber music, occasionally programming his own works. Programs exist showing that Schenker accompanied French horn virtuoso Louis Savart in Schenker's Serenade für Waldhorn on 5 November 1893 (at the Salle der Börse) and 5 March 1894 (at the Bösendorfersaal). Schenker also was the accompanist for Lieder singer Johan Messchaert on a tour organized by the Ludwig Grünfeld Bureau whose stops included Klagenfurt (8 January), Graz (11 January), Trieste (13 January), Brünn (15 January), Lemberg (17 January), Vienna (19 January), Budapest (21 January), Linz (24 January), Vienna again (26 January), Ústí nad Labem (30 January) and again Budapest (3 February). This tour enabled Schenker to play his own pieces, namely the Fantasia op. 2 and the Allegretto grazioso from Op. 4, no. 2. Existing correspondence shows that Messchaert was highly appreciative. Schenker also accompanied the bass singer Eduard Gärtner on occasion, and Gärtner programmed Schenker's song "Meeresstille" Op. 6, no. 3 and Blumengruß on a concert at the Bösendorfersaal on 19 January 1895. On a Gärtner recital 26 January 1900, Schenker and Moriz Violin gave the premiere of the Syrian Dances. On 1 December 1900, Gärtner, accompanied by Alexander von Zemlinsky, sang Schenker's Wiegenlied, Op. 3 no. 2 and on 13 March 1902 Gärtner sang Ausklang, Op. 3, no. 4, and on 26 January 1905 at the Bösendorfersaal), Gärtner sang Op. 6, nos. 1 and 2.

In 1897, Schenker went on a tour to file performance reports from various places. He was disappointed in much of the new music he heard and documented it in the reviews he wrote.

== Theorist ==
Having failed to gain recognition as a composer, conductor, and accompanist, by 1900 he shifted his focus increasingly on problems of musical editing and music theory, though years later he still felt proud of his compositions. According to Federhofer, compositional activity for Schenker was not a means to an end in itself but a pedagogical one, a path to understanding the desires of a composer. Over time, Schenker saw how traditional understanding of music was disappearing and felt it necessary to revise music and theory lessons and remove later editorial additions from musical texts. Already in his 1895 article "Der Geist der musikalischen Technik" he spoke of the adulteration of contemporary music editions of classical composers and advocated the use of Urtext editions.

Already with his first publication, "A Contribution to the Study of Ornamentation", Schenker understood his theoretical work to be a long-range pursuit. When he tried to get his Harmony (the first part of his New Musical Theory and Fantasies) published by Breitkopf & Härtel, it was rejected, the publisher citing Hugo Riemann's work to have covered all that was necessary. Max Kalbeck reported on his unsuccessful attempt to get the work published by N. Simrock. Though impressed by certain passages, the eventual publisher, Cotta, initially rejected Schenker's manuscript but changed its mind after intervention from D'Albert. Cotta finally published Harmony anonymously with money from Alphonse de Rothschild to whom Schenker had given lessons.

The publisher Universal Edition's proximity (they were in Vienna, where Schenker was living, while Cotta was in Stuttgart) made Schenker break with Cotta. Universal Edition was to remain Schenker's main publisher. Schenker hoped his monograph on Beethoven's 9th Symphony (published in 1912) would have a revelatory effect, but believed that the book's reception would be clouded by musicians' faulty understanding, due to poor theoretical instruction. As he kept working on his New Musical Theory and Fantasies, the work kept growing.

Between 1913 and 1921, Schenker brought out an explanatory edition of four of the last five Beethoven sonatas. While examining the autograph to Beethoven's Sonata, op. 109 (at that time belonging to the Wittgenstein family), Schenker mentioned in a letter to his friend Theodor von Frimmel how his Urtext work was inspired by Ernst Rudorff and Joseph Joachim. In 1912, Schenker wrote excitedly to Emil Hertzka, the head of Universal Edition, of the "sensational new changes" he would incorporate into his new edition of Beethoven's Op. 109, having examined the autograph, a revised copy by Beethoven, the original edition and other later editions. Federhofer credits Schenker with initiating the modern Urtext movement of examining multiple authentic sources to arrive at a reading.

Even though Der Tonwille originally came out under the imprint "Tonwille-Flutterverlag" (actually published jointly by Albert J. Gutmann of Vienna and Friedrich Hofmeister of Leipzig), Universal Edition soon purchased Gutmann but still issued Der Tonwille under its original imprint. Schenker's works presented a political challenge to Universal Edition: although they were developing their reputation as a promoter of contemporary music, it could be politically embarrassing for one of their authors (Schenker) to rally against their primary clientele.

Beginning with the publication of Der Tonwille in 1921, a Latin motto appears on all of Schenker published works: Semper idem sed non eodem modo ("always the same, but not always in the same way"). William Pastille proposed that this is based on a line in Augustine of Hippo's Confessions, Book 8, chapter 3: nam tu semper idem, quia ea quae non-semper nec eodem modo sunt eodem modo semper nosti omnia ("For you [are] always the same thing, because you know in the same way all those things that are not the same nor in the same way"). Based on conversation with an unnamed Latin scholar, William Helmcke added that it could also be based on a passage from Irenaeus's Adversus Haereses (Against Heresies): sine initio et sine fine, vere et semper idem et eodem modo se habens solus est Deus ("Without beginning and without end, only God continues truly and always the same and in the same way").

Emil Hertzka, the head of Universal Edition from 1907 until his death in 1932, had a fraught relationship with Schenker. When Schenker was planning a diatribe against Paul Bekker whose monograph on Beethoven was very popular at the time, Hertzka refused to consider publishing it, noting that Bekker and he were close friends. Various passages in issues of Der Tonwille had to be removed because Hertzka felt they were too politically and socially sensitive. Schenker recalled a standoff with Hertzka, where Hertzka, took a "pacifist attitude towards international relations, cosmopolitan, democratic beliefs, working toward compromises". Over time, Schenker's attitude toward Hertzka and Universal Edition increased from disagreement to hostility, charging the firm with not doing enough to promote his work and accused them of not paying him the proper amount.

He had already admired his student Hans Weisse for leaving Vienna for Munich and also noted positively on his other students' desire to move to Germany. In 1931, Hans Weisse left for New York City, where he and subsequently fellow protégé Felix Salzer established Schenkerian analysis as a core curriculum and practice at the Mannes School of Music. Wilhelm Furtwängler called upon Karl Straube to see whether Schenker might be able to teach in Munich. But Schenker never left Vienna and was unable to obtain a position elsewhere, in part due to the nature of his uncompromising views.

Schenker's personal life was taken up with his marriage to Jeanette Kornfeld (born Schiff). He knew her from at least 1907 but could only marry after her first husband agreed to divorce. Schenker married Jeanette on 10 November 1919. He dedicated Free Composition, his last work, to her. They had no children.

Schenker could also count on the patronage of a group of supporters. Alphonse de Rothschild was mentioned above. In addition, there were Sophie Deutsch, Angi Elias, Wilhelm Furtwängler, an industrialist named Khuner, and Anthony van Hoboken. Deutsch, Elias and Hoboken were in his immediate circle of students. Deutsch, who died in a sanatarium in 1917, left an inheritance that enabled Schenker to publish the second volume of his counterpoint book (1922) and named him to a society of destitute artists. Other funding came from Robert Brünauer, one of Schenker's students and the owner of a chocolate manufacturing firm (Brünauer had introduced the artist Victor Hammer to Schenker). Not only was Hoboken instrumental in setting up the Photogrammarchivs von Meisterhandschriften in the Austrian National Library, but he was responsible for paying for the publication of volume 2 of Das Meisterwerk and Free Composition.

Furtwängler consulted with Schenker as if a student. In a letter to Alphonse de Rothschild, Schenker wrote that Furtwängler's interest was first aroused by Schenker's monograph on Beethoven's 9th Symphony, and that since then

In all the years he has never failed to visit me, spend hours with me and all sorts of to learn from me. He describes himself as one of my students, and that fills me with no little pride.

In 1908, Schenker had hoped for an appointment at the Akademie für Musik und darstellende Kunst (today the University of Music and Performing Arts, Vienna). However, the conflict between his beliefs and the need to compromise to work within an academic system ultimately thwarted the opportunity. Even as late as 1932–33, Furtwängler tried to intercede with Ludwig Karpath to obtain a position for Schenker, without success. Despite the lack of success, Schenker was gratified by Furtwängler's words.

Schenker never taught in a school but most often taught in his house at the piano. His fees were not inexpensive, but he demonstrated a fierce loyalty to his students. Though he could be unsparing in his criticism, the goal of his teaching was on the acquisition of a comprehensive musical education intertwined with the art of performance, as they were dependent on each other. Understanding the artwork was the object and purpose of his teaching, where theory and practice were an inseparable unity.

== Declining health and death ==
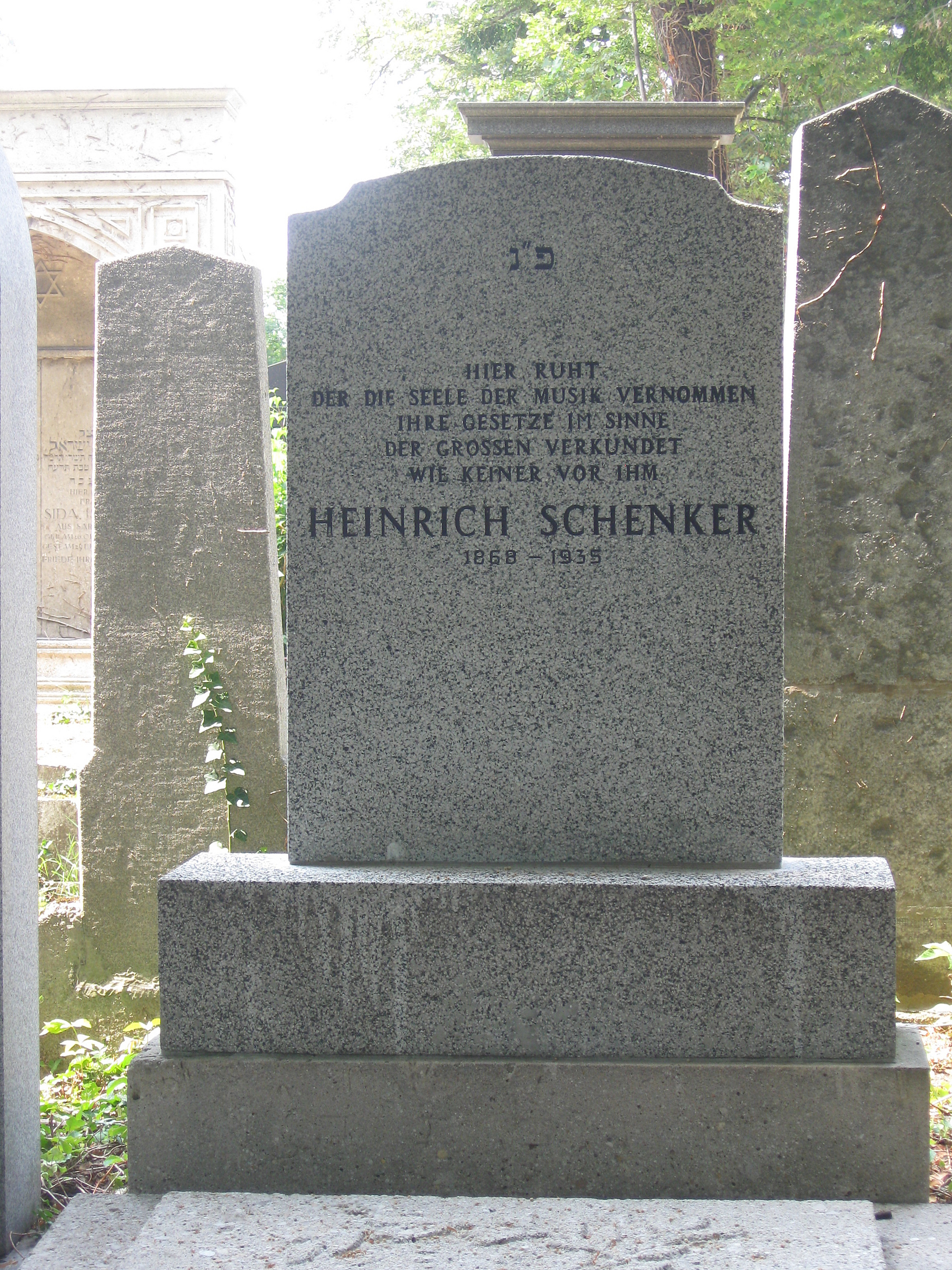
Grave of Heinrich Schenker in the Jewish section of the Zentralfriedhof in Vienna

In his later years Schenker complained of fatigue. He and Jeanette would spend summers usually in the Tyrolean mountains, most often in the town Galtür. In his correspondence with Victor Hammer, Schenker revealed that he was very near-sighted which hindered him from obtaining a better understanding of painting. Additionally he suffered from goiter and obesity, reasons for which he was granted a permanent exemption from military service. Already in 1914, he had been diagnosed with diabetes which necessitated frequent visits to the doctor and an enforced diet (which Schenker did not always keep).

Even towards the end of life, Schenker worked steadily. He corrected proofs for Free Composition from 16 to 23 December 1934. He commented negatively on a radio broadcast of 30 December 1934, but then heard Johann Strauss's Die Fledermaus in a live broadcast from the Vienna State Opera and declared it a "most brilliant performance". On a medical examination of 4 January 1935, he received an unfavorable report, noting symptoms including the swelling of his feet and extreme thirst. He was taken to a sanatorium for an insulin therapy.

Jeanette recorded Schenker's final moments in his diary:

From within a slight stupor I heard him say "... From..." "From what?" I say, "we'll still be with one another" – and I make a sudden gesture, because I did not understand. He continued: "from... from the St. Matthew Passion something occurred to me..." These were the last words of my beloved.

Schenker died on 14 January 1935, age 66 at 2 AM, the cause of death listed as diabetes and arteriosclerosis. He was buried on 17 January at the Wiener Zentralfriedhof, Gate 4, Group 3, Series 4, number 8. The inscription on his grave reads: "Hier ruht, der die Seele der Musik vernommen, ihre Gesetze im Sinne der Großen verkündet wie Keiner vor ihm" (Here lies he who examined and revealed the laws concerning the soul of music like none other before him).

Jeanette Schenker stayed in Vienna after the Anschluss. Persecuted for being Jewish, she was rescued twice from the Nazis before being arrested and transported on 29 June 1942. She died in Theresienstadt on 8 January 1945.

== Schenker's views on race ==
German chauvinism is sprinkled throughout Heinrich Schenker's theoretical writing. In Der freie satz, he suggests linear progressions can be used as a kind of "Blutprobe" (blood test), because they are indicative of German musical genius. He argues Beethoven passes this test, despite his Flemish ancestry. Schenker's work occasionally contained other toxic discourse, such as his analysis of Beethoven's Piano Sonata Op. 101 which shoehorns in racist comments about France and Senegal.

Music theorists have often analyzed Schenker's views on race. In 2019, Philip Ewell argued Schenker's hierarchical analysis was emblematic of a "white racial frame" around the entire field of music theory. He viewed Schenker's racial prejudices as formative of his music theory. Ewell also suggested that music theorists "whitewashed" Schenker's views.

Journal of Schenkerian Studies editor Timothy L. Jackson organized a special issue responding to Ewell's argument. Jackson's barbed contribution depicted Schenker as misunderstood and defended the cloistering of the theorist's pseudoscientific musings to prevent them from undermining Schenker's genuine insights. In a blog post, Columbia University linguist John McWhorter asked, "If Ewell's claim is that music is racist when involving hierarchical relationships between elements, then we must ask where that puts a great deal of music created by non-white people." In Acta Musicologica, Kofi Agawu also disagreed with Ewell's perspective on hierarchy, "The worst consequence of claiming technical procedures for whiteness is denying the existence of shared ways of proceeding, and in effect enjoining our hypothetical West African theorist to go look for something different, a new grounding principle, better if it is anchored in nonhierarchy, something uniquely his own, something 'black.'...I fail to see how such a strategy can be empowering for black scholars".

== Works ==
=== Theoretical writings ===
- Ein Beitrag zu Ornamentik. Vienna: Universal Edition, 1904. Revised 1908.
  - English translation: "A Contribution to the Study of Ornamentation", translated and edited by Hedi Siegel. The Music Forum 4 (New York: Columbia University Press, 1976), pp. 1–139.
- Harmonielehre. Neue Musikalische Theorien und Phantasien part 1. Stuttgart: J. G. Cotta, 1906.
  - English translation: Harmony edited and annotated by Oswald Jonas, translated by Elisabeth Mann Borgese. Chicago: University of Chicago Press, 1954 (edition with some cuts in text and music examples)
- Kontrapunkt, vol. 1. Neue Musikalische Theorien und Phantasien part 2. Vienna: Universal Edition, 1910.
  - English translation: Counterpoint: a translation of Kontrapunkt. Translated by John Rothgeb and Jürgen Thym, edited by John Rothgeb. New York: Schirmer Books, 1987.
- Beethovens neunte Sinfonie: eine Darstellung des musikalischen Inhaltes unter fortlaufender Berücksichtigung auch des Vortrages unter der Literatur. Vienna: Universal Edition, 1912.
  - English translation: Beethoven's Ninth Symphony: a Portrayal of its Musical Content, with Running Commentary on Performance and Literature as well. Translated and edited by John Rothgeb. New Haven: Yale University Press, 1992.
- Kontrapunkt, vol. 2. Neue Musikalische Theorien und Phantasien part 2. Vienna: Universal Edition, 1922.
  - English translation: see volume 1.
- Der Tonwille: Flugblätter zum Zeugnis unwandelbarer Gesetze der Tonkunst einer neuen Jugend dargebracht. Vienna: Tonwille-Flugblätterverlag [Universal Edition].
  - No. 1: 1921.
  - No. 2: 1922.
  - No. 3: 1922.
  - No. 4: 1923.
  - No. 5: 1923.
  - No. 6: 1923.
  - No. 7: January–March 1924.
  - No. 8/9: April–September 1924
  - No. 10: October 1924.
    - English translation: Der Tonwille: Pamphlets in Witness of the Immutable Laws of Music. Edited by William Drabkin, translated by Ian Bent et al. New York: Oxford University Press, 2004–2005.
- Das Meisterwerk in der Musik
  - Jahrbuch no. 1. Munich: Drei Masken Verlag, 1925.
  - Jahrbuch no. 2. Munich: Drei Masken Verlag, 1926.
  - Jahrbuch no. 3. Munich: Drei Masken Verlag, 1930.
    - English translation: The Masterwork in Music: a Yearbook. Edited by William Drabkin, translated by Ian Bent, et al. Cambridge and New York: Cambridge University Press, 1994–1997.
- Fünf Urlinie-Tafeln. Vienna: Universal Edition; Five analyses in sketchform, bilingual edition, New York: David Mannes School, 1932 (only the title page and the Foreword are bilingual, the annotations in the plates are in German).
  - English translation: Five graphic music analyses (Fünf Urlinie-Tafeln). With a new introduction and glossary by Felix Salzer. New York: Dover, 1969.
- Der freie Satz. Neue Musikalische Theorien und Phantasien part 3. Vienna: Universal Edition, 1935.
  - English translation of the 2d edition (1954): Free composition (Der freie Satz): volume III of New musical theories and fantasies. Translated and edited by Ernst Oster. New York: Longman, 1979.

=== Editions with or without explanatory texts ===
- Bach, Carl Philipp Emanuel. Klavierwerke. Neue kritische Ausgabe von Heinrich Schenker. Vienna: Universal Edition, 1902.
- Handel, Georg Frideric. Zwolf Orgel-Concerte fur Klavier zu 4 Handen bearbeitet von Heinrich Schenker. Vienna: Universal Edition, 1904.
- Bach, Johann Sebastian. Chromatische Phantasie und Fugue, Erläuterungsausgabe. Vienna: Universal Edition, 1909.
  - English translation: J. S. Bach's Chromatic Fantasy and Fugue: Critical Edition with Commentary. Translated and edited by Hedi Siegel. New York: Longman, 1984.
- Beethoven, Ludwig van. Die letzten fünf Sonaten von Beethoven. Erläuterungsausgabe der Sonate A-Dur, op. 109. Kritische Edition mit Einführung und Erläuterung. Vienna: Universal Edition, 1913.
- Beethoven, Ludwig van. Die letzten fünf Sonaten von Beethoven. Erläuterungsausgabe der Sonate A-Dur, op. 110. kritische Ausgabe mit Einführung und Erläuterung. Vienna: Universal Edition, 1914.
- Beethoven, Ludwig van. Die letzten fünf Sonaten von Beethoven. Erläuterungsausgabe der Sonate A-Dur, op. 111. kritische Ausgabe mit Einführung und Erläuterung. Vienna: Universal Edition, 1916.
- Beethoven, Ludwig van. Die letzten fünf Sonaten von Beethoven. Erläuterungsausgabe der Sonate A-Dur, op. 101. kritische Ausgabe mit Einführung und Erläuterung. Vienna: Universal Edition, 1921.
- Beethoven, Ludwig van. Sonate Op. 27, Nr. 2 (Die sogenannte Mondscheinsonate) mit 3 Skizzenblättern des Meisters. Vienna: Universal Edition, 1921.
- Beethoven, Ludwig van. Klaviersonaten, nach den Autographen rekonstruiert von Heinrich Schenker. Vienna: Universal Edition, 1928.
  - English translation: Complete Piano Sonatas. Edited by Heinrich Schenker with a new introduction by Carl Schachter. New York: Dover Publications, 1975.
- Johannes Brahms, Oktaven und Quinten u. A., aus dem Nachlass herausgegeben und erläutert. Vienna: Universal Edition, 1933.
  - English translation: Johannes Brahms: Octaves and Fifths translated by Paul Mast. The Music Forum 5 (New York: Columbia University Press, 1980), pp. 1–196.

=== Non-theoretical articles, reviews and essays ===
- "Johannes Brahms. Fünf Lieder für eine Singstimme mit Pianoforte, Op. 107", Musikalisches Wochenblatt, Jahrgang 22 (1891), pp. 514–517.
- "Hermann Grädener. Quintett No. 2, Cmoll für Pianoforte, zwei Violinen, Viola und Violoncell, Op. 19", Musikalisches Wochenblatt, Jahrgang 23 (1892), pp. 214–216.
- "Johannes Brahms. Fünf Gesänge für gemischten Chor a cappella, Op. 104", Musikalisches Wochenblatt, Jahrgang 23 (1892), pp. 409–412, 425, 437.
- "Mascagni in Wien", Die Zukunft, Band 1 (1892), pp. 137–139.
- "Eine jung-italienische Schule?", Die Zukunft, Band 1 (1892), pp. 460–462.
- "Mascagnis "Rantzau'", Die Zukunft, Band 2 (1893), pp.280–284.
- "Anton Bruckner. Psalm 150 für Chor, Soli und Orchester". Musikalisches Wochenblatt, Jahrgang 24 (1893), pp. 159ff.
- "Ein Gruß an Johannes Brahms. Zu seinem 60. Geburtstag, 7. Mai 1893", Die Zukunft, Band 3 (1893), p. 279.
- "Notizen zu Verdis Falstaff", Die Zukunft, Band 3 (1893), pp. 474–476.
- "Friedrich Smetana", Die Zukunft, Band 4 (1893), pp. 37–40.
- "Der Sonzogno-Markt in Wien", Die Zukunft, Band 4 (1893), pp. 282ff.
- "Anton Bruckner", Die Zukunft, Band 5 (1893), pp. 135–137.
- "Die Musik von heute. (Neue Variationen über ein altes Thema.)" Neue Revue, Jahrgang 5, Band 1 (1894), pp. 87ff.
- "Johannes Brahms. Phantasien für Pianoforte, Op. 116", Musikalisches Wochenblatt, Jahrgang 25 (1894), pp. 37ff.
- "Ruggiero Leoncavallo", Die Zukunft, Band 6 (1894), pp. 138–140.
- "Ondficek – Popper – Door", Neue Revue, Jahrgang 5, Band 1 (1894), pp. 278–280.
- "Im Wiener Konservatorium – Johann Nepomuk Fuchs", Neue Revue, Jahrgang 5, Band 1 (1894), p. 318.
- "Smetana's 'Kuß' (Zur ersten Aufführung in der Hofoper)", Neue Revue, Jahrgang 5, Band 1 (1894), pp. 34–50.
- "Hofoper – Smetana's 'Kuß'", Neue Revue, Jahrgang 5, Band 1 (1894), p. 375.
- "Theater an der Wien – Adolphe Adam, Jacques Offenbach, Vilem Blodek", Neue Revue, Jahrgang 5, Band 2 (1894), p. 377.
- "Hofoperntheater – Ferdinand Hummel, Mara", Neue Revue, Jahrgang 5, Band 2 (1894), pp. 475–76.
- "Konzertdirigenten", Die Zukunft, Band 7 (1894), pp. 88–92.
- "Anton Rubinstein", Neue Revue, Jahrgang 5, Band 1 (1894), pp. 566ff.
- "Verdis Falstaff", Die Zukunft, Band 7 (1894), pp. 230–233.
- "Zum Jubiläum der Hofoper", Neue Revue, Jahrgang 5, Band 1 (1894), pp. 754–756.
- "Tantiemen für Instrumentalkomponisten?", Die Zukunft, Band 7 (1894), pp. 477–479.
- "Das Hören in der Musik", Neue Revue, Jahrgang 5, Band 2 (1894), pp. 115–121.
- "Anton Rubinstein", Die Zukunft, Band 8 (1894), pp. 326–329.
- "Aus dem Leben Smetana's. (Ein Besuch bei Fr. Smetana's Witwe.)", Neues Wiener Tagblatt, Jahrgang 28 (1894), no. 245, 6 September.
- "Eugen d' Albert", Die Zukunft, Band 9 (1894), p. 33–36.
- "Volksmusik in Wien", Neue Revue, Jahrgang 5, Band 2, (1894), p. 516–521.
- "Deutsch-Oesterreichischer Musikverkehr", Die Zukunft, Band 11 (1895), p. 182–185.
- "Der Geist der musikalischen Technik", Musikalisches Wochenblatt, Jahrgang 26 (1895), pp. 245ff., 257–259, 273ff., 285, 297, 309, 325.
- "Rubinstein-Preis", Die Zeit, Band 4 (1895), p. 157.
- "Eduard Hanslick. 70. Geburtstag", Die Zeit, Band 4 (1895), p. 174.
- "Zur musikalischefi Erziehung", Die Zeit, Band 4 (1895), pp. 185, 200–202.
- "Le comte de Chambrun et Stanislaus Legis: Wagner, Paris 1895", Die Zeit, Band 4 (1895), pp. 206ff.
- "Hofoperntheater – Jules Massenet, Das Mädchen von Navarra", Die Zeit, Band 5 (1895), p. 12.
- "H. Berte, Ballett Amor auf Reisen", Die Zeit, Band 5 (1895), p. 14.
- "Arthur Prüfer – Johann Hermann Schein, Leipzig 1895", Die Zeit, Band 5 (1895), p. 30.
- "Hofoperntheater – Heinrich Marschner, Der Templer und die Jüdin", Die Zeit, Band 5 (1895), p. 44.
- "Ludwig Hartmann, Richard Wagner's Tannhäuser, Dresden 1895", Die Zeit, Band 5 (1895), p. 44.
- "Eine neue Haydn-Oper (Zur Matinee im Carlstheater am 3. November [1895])", Die Zeit, Band 5 (1895), pp. 90ff.
- "B. Todt, Vademecum durch die Bach'schen Cantaten, Leipzig 1895", Die Zeit, Band 5 (1895), p. 94.
- "Gesellschaft der Musikfreunde in Wien -Gesellschaftsconcert, Ben Davies-Quartett Rosé", Die Zeit, Band 5 (1895), p. 108.
- "Hofoperntheater – François Adrien Boieldieu, Rotkäppchen", Die Zeit, Band 5 (1895), p. 126.
- "Philharmonisches Konzert – Hans Richter", Die Zeit, Band 5 (1895), p. 126.
- "Kammermusik – Das böhmische Streichquartett", Die Zeit, Band 5 (1895), p. 142.
- "Theater an der Wien – Johann Strauß, Waldmeister", Die Zeit, Band 5 (1895), p. 157.
- "Zweites philharmonisches Konzert – Antonin Dvorak, Othello-Ouverture", Die Zeit, Band 5 (1895), p. 173.
- "J. S. Bach, "Weihnachtsoratorium", Eugen Gura, Eugen d' Albert-Soiree des böhmischen Streichquartetts- Drittes philharmonisches Konzert", Die Zeit, Band 5 (1895), p. 186ff.
- "Bülow-Weingartner", Musikalisches Wochenblatt, Jahrgang 26 (1895), pp. 610ff.
- "Viertes philharmonisches Konzert – Peter Iljitsch Tschaikowsky, Symphonie Nr. 6", Die Zeit, Band 6 (1896), p. 13.
- "Wilhelm Kienzl, Der Evangelimann – Erstaufführung in Wien", Die Zeit, Band 6 (1896), pp. 44ff.
- "Fünftes philharmonisches Konzert – Zweites Konzert der Gesellschaft der Musikfreunde in Wien", Die Zeit, Band 6 (1896), p. 46.
- "Die jungen Dirigenten", Die Zeit, Band 6 (1896), p. 57ff.
- "Lilian Bailey (Henschel)", Die Zeit, Band 6 (1896), p. 78.
- "Böhmisches Streichquartett; Karel Bendl, Rose-Quartett, Giovanni Sgambati, Johann Nepomuk Hummel, Alfred Grünfeld", Die Zeit, Band 6 (1896), p. 94.
- "Drittes Konzert der Gesellschaft der Musikfreunde in Wien – Jules Massenet, Mystere Eve – Liederabend Johannes Messchaert, Julius Röntgen", Die Zeit, Band 6 (1896), p. 113.
- "Damen-Streichquartett Soldat Roeger – Böhmisches Streichquartett, Alexander Borodin, Robert Hausmann, Bronislaw Huberman," Die Zeit, Band 6 (1896), p. 130.
- "Vianna da Motta, Nachtrag zu Studien bei Hans von Bülow von Theodor Pfeiffer, Berlin-Leipzig 1896", Die Zeit, Band 6 (1896), p. 146.
- "Zweiter Liederabend Johannes Messchaert, Julius Röntgen – Sechstes und siebentes philharmonisches Konzert", Die Zeit, Band 6 (1896), pp. 158ff.
- "Albert Kauder, Walther von der Vogelweide", Die Zeit, Band 6 (1896), p. 160.
- "Holländisches Terzett", Die Zeit, Band 6 (1896), p. 161.
- "Carl Reinecke", Die Zeit, Band 6 (1896), p. 178.
- "Gaetano Donizetti: Lucia di Lammermoor", Die Zeit, Band 6 (1896), p. 193.
- "Bronislaw Huberman – Damen-Streichquartett Soldat-Roeger – Richard Mühlfeld – Felix Weingartner", Die Zeit, Band 6 (1896), p. 194.
- "Carl Goldmark, Das Heimchen am Herd -Erstaufführung in Wien", Die Zeit, Band 6 (1896), p. 207.
- "Siegfried Wagner", Die Zukunft, Band 14 (1896), pp. 281–283.
- "Das Heimchen am Herd", Die Zukunft, Band 15 (1896), pp. 132–134.
- "Der Chor des Laibacher Musikvereins Glasbena Matica (Leitung Matej Hubad) – Richard Strauss, Till Eulenspiegels lustige Streiche – Friedrich Kiel, Christus", Die Zeit, Band 7 (1896), pp. 26ff.
- "Zur Mozartfeier", Die Zeit, Band 7 (1896), p. 60.
- "Giuseppe Verdi, Aida", Die Zeit, Band 7 (1896), p. 62.
- "Oper. (Ein Vorschlag zur Inscenierung des Gluck'schen Orpheus')", Die Zeit, Band 7 (1896), pp. 91ff.
- "Marie Lehmann", Die Zeit, Band 7 (1896), pp. 93ff.
- "Francisco d'Andrade", Die Zeit, Band 7 (1896), p. 109ff.
- "Ehrenzeichen für Johannes Brahms", Die Zeit, Band 7 (1896), p. 110.
- "Anton Bruckner", Die Zeit, Band 7 (1896), pp. 184–186.
- "Carl Reinecke, Die Beethoven'schen Clavier-Sonaten, Leipzig 1896", Die Zeit, Band 8 (1896), pp. 14ff.
- "Ernst Possart, Über die Neueinstudierung und Neuinscenierung des Mozart'schen Don Giovanni (Don Juan) auf dem kgl. Residenztheater zu München, München 1896", Die Zeit, Band 8 (1896), p. 78.
- “Daniel François Esprit Auber, Fra Diavolo-Pietro Mascagni, Zanetto", Die Zeit, Band 8 (1896), p. 157.
- "Routine in der Musik", Neue Revue, Jahrgang 7, Band 2 (1896), pp. 555–558.
- "Konzert Carl Reinecke", Neue Revue, Jahrgang 8, Band 1 (1897), p. 438ff.
- "Ein Epilog zur Schubertfeier", Neue Revue, Jahrgang 8, Band 1 (1897), pp. 211–216.
- "Unpersönliche Musik", Neue Revue, Jahrgang 8, Band 1 (1897), pp. 464–468.
- "Die Berliner 'Philharmoniker'", Neue Revue, Jahrgang 8, Band 1 (1897), pp. 495–497.
- "Johannes Brahms (geb. am 7. Mai 1833, est. am 3. April 1897)", Neue Revue, Jahrgang 8, Band 1 (1897), pp. 516–520.
- "Johannes Brahms. (Die Zukunft)", Die Zukunft, Band 19 (1897), pp. 261–265.
- "Theater an der Wien: Engelbert Humperdinck, Königskinder", Neue Revue, Jahrgang 8, Band 1 (1897), p. 646.
- "Capellmeister-Regisseure", Neue Revue, Jahrgang 8, Band 1 (1897), pp. 669–672.
- "Musikalische Reisebetrachtungen", Neue Revue, Jahrgang 8, Band 1 (1897), pp. 788–793.
- "Mehr Kunst!", Neue Revue, Jahrgang 8, Band 2 (1897), pp. 409–412.
- "Hofoper – Friedrich Smetana, Dalibor, Erstaufführung in Wien unter Gustav Mahler", Neue Revue, Jahrgang 8, Band 2 (1897), pp. 448ff.
- "Theater an der Wien – Giacomo Puccini, La Boheme, Erstaufführung in Wien", Neue Revue, Jahrgang 8, Band 1 (1897), pp. 473ff.
- "Hofoperntheater – P. I. Tschaikowsky, Eugen Onegin, Erstaufführung in Wien", Neue Revue, Jahrgang 8, Band 2 (1897), pp. 654ff.
- "Ein Wort zur Mozartrenaissance", Neue Revue, Jahrgang 8, Band 2 (1897), p. 685–688.
- "Hofoperntheater – Richard Heuberger, Ballett Struwwelpeter", Neue Revue, Jahrgang 9, Band 1 (1898), p. 82.
- "Hofoperntheater – Georges Bizet, Djamileh, Erstaufführung in Wien unter Gustav Mahler", Neue Revue, Jahrgang 9, Band 1 (1898), pp. 143ff.
- "Hofoperntheater – Ruggiero Leoncavallo, La Boheme, Erstaufführung in Wien unter Gustav Mahler", Neue Revue, Jahrgang 9, Band 1 (1898), p. 292.
- "Componisten und Dirigenten", Neue Revue, Jahrgang 9, Band 1 (1898), pp. 349ff.
- "Beethoven-'Retouche'", Wiener Abendpost (supplement to the Wiener Zeitung) (9 January 1901), pp. 6ff.
- "Heinrich Schenkers Beethoven Ausgaben". Der Merker, Jahrgang 7, no. 3 (1 February 1916), pp. 81–89.
- "Joh. Seb. Bach: Wohltemperiertes Klavier, Band 1, Präludium c-moll", Die Musik, Jahrgang 15, no. 9 (Jun. 1923), p. 641–651. (Subsequently, subsumed into an article in Das Meisterwer in der Musik, Band 2).
- "Die Urlinie", Die Musikanten Gilde (1 July 1923), pp. 77–80. (Reprint of the article from Der Tonwille vol. 1)
- "Franz Schubert". Moderne Welt (1 December 1925), pp. 20.
- "Beethoven und seine Nachfahren". General-Anzeiger für Bonn und Umgegend (26 March 1927), pp. 3–4.
- "Eine Rettung der klassichen Musik-Texte: Das Archiv für Photogramme in der National-Bibliothek, Wien". Der Kunstwart vol. 42 (March 1929), pp. 359–367.
- "Miszellen". Zeitschrift für Musikwissenschaft, vol. 12, no. 7 (April 1930), p. 446.
- "Gedanken über Kultur, Kunst und Musik". Der Kunstwart, vol. 44 (January 1931), pp. 222–230. (A reprint of the "Vermischtes" sections from Das Meisterwerk in der Musik, vols. 1–3)
- "Ein verschollener Brief von Mozart und das Geheimnis seines Schaffens". Der Kunstwart vol. 44 (July 1931), pp. 660–666.
- "Eine Anzeige und eine Selbstanzeige". Der Kunstwart, vol. 46 (December 1932), pp. 194–196.
- "Was wird aus der Musik?" Deutsche Allgemeine Zeitung (28 April 1933).
- "Erinnerung an Brahms". Der Kunstwart vol. 46 (May 1933), p. 475–482.
- "Vom Unterschied zwischen der italienischen und der deutschen Musik", Deutsche Zeitschrift, vol. 47 (August 1934), p. 700–703.

=== List of compositions ===
Based on Miller.

- Zwei Clavierstücke, op. 1. Vienna: Ludwig Doblinger, n.d. [1892]. Reprint Vienna, Doblinger, 1982.
  - No. 1: Etude.
  - No. 2: Capriccio.
- Serenade für Waldhorn. Unpublished. Played by Louis Sawart and Heinrich Schenker in Vienna, 5 November 1893 and 5 March 1894.
- Fantasie, op. 2. Leipzig: Breitkopf und Härtel, 1898.
- Sechs Lieder für eine Singstimme mit Begleitung des Pianoforte, op. 3. Leipzig: Breitkopf und Härtel, 1898, 1901.
  - No. 1: Versteckte Jasminen (Detlev von Liliencron)
  - No. 2: Wiegenlied (Detlev von Liliencron)
  - No. 3: Vogel im Busch (Detlev von Liliencron)
  - No. 4: Ausklang (Ludwig Jacobowski)
  - No. 5: Allein (Ludwig Jacobowski)
  - No. 6: Einkleidung (Wilhelm Müller)
- Fünf Klavierstücke, op. 4. Leipzig: Breitkopf und Härtel, 1898.
  - No. 1: Andante, C minor
  - No. 2: Allegretto grazioso, G major
  - No. 3: Andante con moto e rubato, B♭ minor
  - No. 4: Allegretto poco agitato e rubato, E♭ major
  - No. 5: Quasi allegretto, D major
- Zweistimmige Inventionen, op. 5. Leipzig: Breitkopf und Härtel, 1898, 1901.
  - No. 1: Allegro amabile, G major
  - No. 2: Con moto appassionato e con molto sentimento, F♯ minor
  - No. 3: Vivace, quasi presto, D minor
  - No. 4: Allegro deciso, A major
- 3 songs for mixed chorus a capella, op. 7
  - No. 3: Vorüber (Johanna Ambrosius) in: Sammlung von 51 gemischten Chören (a capella). Herausgegeben von der Wiener Singakademie, zusammengestellt und zum Teile in Bearbeitung von ihrem artistischen Leiter Carl Lafite. Vienna: Albert Jungmann and C. Lerch, [1903]
- Ländler, op. 10. Berlin: N. Simrock, 1899.
- Syrische Tänze für Pianoforte zu 4 Händen. Vienna: Josef Weinberger, [n.d., composed 1899]. Orchestration (lost) by Arnold Schoenberg, 1903, created by the Berlin Philharmonic Orchestra under the direction of F. Busoni, 5 November 1903. Another orchestration by Moriz Violin is preserved in the Oswald Jonas Collection.
  - Issue 1
    - No. 1: Andante espressivo, Allegro scherzando, D minor
    - No. 2: Allegro con fuoco, C minor
  - Heft 2
    - No. 1: Allegretto, G minor
    - No. 2: Allegro molto passionate, D major

More than 500 pages of manuscript compositions are preserved in the Oswald Jonas Collection and some unpublished choral works in the National Library in Vienna.

== Sources ==
- Ewell, Philip A. (September 2020). "Music Theory and the White Racial Frame". Music Theory Online. 26 (2). doi:10.30535/mto.26.2.4. S2CID 225811248.
- Federhofer, Hellmut (1985). Heinrich Schenker, nach Tagebüchern und Briefen in der Oswald Jonas Memorial Collection. Hildesheim: Georg Olms Verlag. ISBN 978-3-487-07642-3.
- Schenker, Heinrich (2014). Bent, Ian; Bretherton, David; Drabkin, William (eds.). Heinrich Schenker: Selected Correspondence. London: Boydell Press. ISBN 978-1-84383-964-4. JSTOR 10.7722/j.ctt6wp9hd.
