= Theoria (disambiguation) =

Theoria is the Greek word for "contemplation". It may also refer to:

- Theoria (music journal), a journal of music published by the University of North Texas College of Music
- Theoria (philosophy journal), a Swedish journal of philosophy published by Wiley-Blackwell
- Theoria (sociology journal), a journal of sociology and politics published by Berghahn
- Theoria (history of science journal), a journal of history of science published by the University of the Basque Country (UPV/EHU)
- Theoria, a 1992 album by Barry Guy and the London Jazz Composers' Orchestra with Irène Schweizer
