= University of North Texas Press =

American university publisher

- Parent company: University of North Texas
- Founded: 1987
- Country of origin: United States
- Headquarters location: Denton, Texas
- Distribution: Texas A&M University Press Consortium
- Publication types: Books, journals
- Official website: untpress.unt.edu

The University of North Texas Press (or UNT Press), founded in 1987, is a university press affiliated with the University of North Texas. It is a member of the Association of University Presses, having been admitted in 2003. The University of North Texas Press is also a member of Texas A&M University Press's Texas Book Consortium program.

== Publications ==
Major publications released by the University of North Texas Press include the following:

=== Notable book series ===
- "A. C. Greene" series
- Al Filo: Mexican American Studies", edited by Roberto R. Calderón
- "Katherine Anne Porter Prize in Short Fiction"
- "Publications of the Texas Folklore Society", edited by the Texas Folklore Society
- "Southwestern Nature Writing Series", edited by David Taylor
- "Vassar Miller Prize in Poetry"

=== Journals ===
- Journal of Schenkerian Studies – journal specializing in Schenkerian analysis of music
- Theoria – journal specializing in music theory and analysis

== See also ==
- List of English-language book publishing companies
- List of university presses
