= Wittliff Collections =

Coordinates: 29°53′21.3″N 97°56′40.4″W

The Wittliff Collections, Texas State University, San Marcos, TX
- Location: San Marcos, TX
- Established: 1986

Access and use
- Circulation: Special Collection (rare materials): does not circulate
- Population served: members of the faculty, students, members of the public (appointment necessary)

Other information
- Director: David Coleman (Curator)
- Employees: 10, including Asst. Curator of the Southwestern Writers Collection, Asst. Curator of the Southwestern & Mexican Photography Collection, Asst. Curator of Acquisitions (vacant), Lead Archivist
- Website: www.thewittliffcollections.txstate.edu

The Wittliff Collections, located on the seventh floor of the Albert B. Alkek Library at Texas State University, was founded by William D. Wittliff in 1986. The Wittliff Collections include the Southwestern Writers Collection and the Southwestern & Mexican Photography Collection.

== Collections ==
=== Southwestern Writers Collection ===
The Collection holds the papers of numerous 20th-century and 21st-century writers, including Jim Hightower, Rick Riordan, Cormac McCarthy, Larry McMurtry, Willie Nelson, Sam Shepard, Sergio Troncoso, Bud Shrake, Texas Monthly magazine, and William D. Wittliff, among others.

The film holdings contain over 500 film and television screenplays as well as complete production archives for several popular films, including the television miniseries Lonesome Dove. The music holdings represent the breadth and scope of popular Texas sounds, and include primary source collections of Progressive country, Tejano music, Texas Blues (including Stevie Ray Vaughan), and Western Swing.

=== Southwestern & Mexican Photography Collection ===
The Southwestern & Mexican Photography Collection assembles a broad range of photographic work from the Southwestern United States and Mexico, from the 19th-century to the present day. Contemporary imagery is emphasized. Materials also include photographs in books, manuscripts, serial publications, and ephemera related to the photographic arts.

The Southwestern & Mexican Photography Collection holds major collections of works by Keith Carter, Russell Lee (vintage photographs), Mariana Yampolsky, Kate Breakey, Rocky Schenck, Graciela Iturbide, Lázaro Blanco, and Yolanda Andrade, and others.
