= Harmony (Schenker) =

Harmony (German: Harmonielehre, or "Theory of Harmony") is a book published in 1906 by Heinrich Schenker. It is the first installment of Schenker's three-volume treatise on music theory entitled New Musical Theories and Fantasies; the others are Counterpoint and Free Composition. Schenker's name did not appear on the original edition of the work – the author was listed simply as "an artist".

Harmony, which was Schenker's first major book-length theoretical writing, is notable for defining the theoretical agenda that Schenker was to carry out over the subsequent three decades. Schenker makes a careful distinction between the theories of harmony (which for Schenker is concerned with relations among scale-steps) and counterpoint (which deals only with voice leading); he argues that other theorists have confusingly mixed these two concepts. He introduces the principle of repetition, which gives rise to the concept of the motive. Schenker also strongly hints about the ways in which large spans of music can be understood as elaborations of simple structures; this idea is perhaps the most characteristic feature of his mature theory. Finally, he discusses the relationship between music and Nature, which would also be a recurring theme throughout his career.

The work also contains the type of polemical writing that was to characterize most of Schenker's output. In Harmony, Schenker expresses his dissatisfaction with the state of music theory and music pedagogy in his time, and, by making frequent references and comparisons to other theorists, argues at length that his own ideas are superior. He would repeat this procedure in his later writings, often adding virulent commentary about the social and political situation of early 20th century Europe.
