= Free Composition =

Free Composition (Der freie Satz) is a treatise by Heinrich Schenker, and possibly Schenker's best known work. The third volume of New Musical Theories and Fantasies (preceded by Harmony and Counterpoint), it was first published posthumously by Universal Edition in Vienna in 1935. A second German edition by Oswald Jonas appeared in Vienna in 1956. The American translation by Ernst Oster was published by Longman, New York and London, in 1979.

Free Composition is often believed to present a complete and systematic outline of Schenker's mature theory, but it relies heavily on his previous writings, especially Der Tonwille and Das Meisterwerk in der Musik and cannot be fully appreciated without some knowledge of these publications.

The word Satz does not easily translate in English. "Free composition", the title of the American translation apparently implies that there may exist a "strict composition", but Schenker considered that composition, by definition, is free, as opposed to strict counterpoint. The French translation proposes L'Écriture libre ("Free writing," as opposed to "Strict writing"). Neither solution is entirely satisfactory.

Free Composition consists of two volumes, one volume of text and one of musical examples. It is divided into three parts, dealing respectively with background, middleground, and foreground levels of structure. The last chapters of Part III are devoted to Meter and Rhythm and to Form.

== See also ==
- Free counterpoint

== Sources ==
- Der freie Satz, Wien, Universal Edition, 1935. UE 6869. 2 vols. XXII+240 pp. and [IV]+119 pp.
- Der freie Satz, 2d edition, edited and revised by O. Jonas, Wien, Universal Edition, 1956. UE 6869a. 2 vols. 240 pp. and [IV]+119 pp.
- Der freie Satz, translation by Theodore Krueger, Ph.D. dissertation, State University of Iowa, 1960.
- Free Composition, 2d edition, translated and edited by E. Oster, New York, Longman, 1979. 2 vols. XXIV+166 pp. and VIII+[119] pp., ISBN 9780582280731
- Free Composition, Macmillan, 1979 ISBN 9780028723310
- Free Composition, Schirmer Books, 1993, ISBN 9780028723327
- Free Composition, translated and edited by E. Oster, Pendragon Press 2001 ISBN 9781576470749
- L'Écriture libre, 2d edition, translated by N. Meeùs, Liège, Mardaga, 1993. ISBN 2-87009-508-2 and ISBN 2-87009-559-7
- 自由作曲 [Free Composition], Chinese translation by Chen, Shi-Ben, Beijing: People’s Music Publications, 1997. ISBN 7-103-01431-0
- Свободное сочинение [Der freie Satz], 2d edition, Russian translation by B. Plotnikov, Krasnoyarsk Academy of Music and Theatre, 2004.
