= Journal of Schenkerian Studies =

- Discipline: Music theory
- Language: English

Publication details
- History: 2005–present
- Publisher: University of North Texas Press

Standard abbreviations
- ISO 4: J. Schenkerian Stud.

Indexing
- ISSN: 1558-268X

Links
- Journal homepage

The Journal of Schenkerian Studies is a peer-reviewed academic journal specializing in music theory and analysis, with a particular focus on Schenkerian analysis based on the ideas of Heinrich Schenker. It is published by the Center for Schenkerian Studies at the University of North Texas College of Music. Its first issue was published in 2005, under editor-in-chief Jennifer Sadoff. As of 2020, it has a paid circulation of approximately 30 copies per issue.

== History ==
The journal was run by graduate students for the publication of its first four volumes. It was thereafter, until 2020, run under the guidance of Timothy L. Jackson and Stephen Slottow. The journal was until 2020 edited by Benjamin Graf. In May 2021, the University of North Texas launched a search for a new editor or editorial team to "restructure and rebrand the journal to promote its long term viability".

The first 11 volumes are freely available online. Vol. 12 was unavailable as of August 2020, but its table of contents and pp. 126–214 are available elsewhere.

== 2020 Special issue ==
In 2020, the journal released a special issue responding to a keynote address at the 2019 conference of the Society for Music Theory by Philip Ewell, titled "Music Theory's White Racial Frame." Ewell's thesis was that because of Schenker's widely acknowledged racism, it was important for contemporary music theorists to consider how using his analytical techniques may lead to bias in modern music scholarship.

In the special issue, Jackson argued that the "fundamental reason for the paucity of African-American women and men in the field of music theory is that few grow up in homes where classic music is profoundly valued." Other authors rejected Ewell's notion that Schenker's racism was connected to his method of analyzing music.

In response, the executive board of the Society for Music Theory released a statement criticizing the journal for its "anti-Black statements and personal ad hominem attacks" on Ewell, as well as its neglect of peer review and failure to invite a written response by Ewell. The Yale University Department of Music also released a statement criticizing the special issue.

In response, the University of North Texas convened a panel to review the circumstances around the creation of the special issue. The panel was composed of five current or former scholarly journal editors from outside the institution. The panel was charged only with reviewing the circumstances around the creation and editing of the issue, and not the contents of the articles themselves. The panel concluded that best scholarly practices were not followed in creation of the issue and recommended significant changes to the editorial structure and policies of the journal. Following the release of the report, the chair of the department told Jackson via email that he could not "support a plan according to which [he] would remain involved in the day-to-day operations of the journal, and its editorial process in particular, given the panel's findings of editorial mismanagement."

On January 14, 2021, Jackson filed a lawsuit against eight members of the University of North Texas Board of Regents, seventeen faculty members in the Division of Music History, Theory, and Ethnomusicology, and one PhD student and teaching fellow, alleging violation of his First Amendment rights and defamation of character. After four years of litigation, the lawsuit was settled in July 2025. In the settlement, Jackson received $725,000 from UNT in damages and legal costs. The University agreed to resume publication of the Journal with Jackson as Editor in chief.
