= Vyshnivchyk =

Coordinates: 49°13′44″N 25°22′7″E

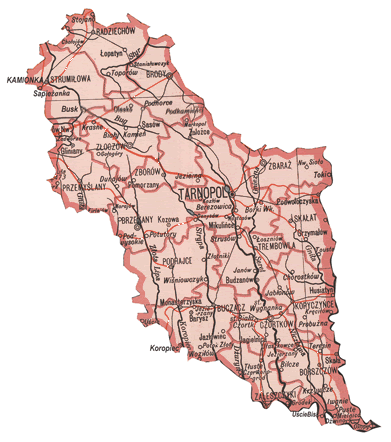
Tarnopol Voivodeship before 17 September 1939. Vyshnivchyk is located south of Ternopil on the Strypa river.

Vyshnivchyk (Ukrainian: Вишнівчик, also Vyshnivchyky, Polish: Wiśniowczyk) is a village in Ternopil Raion of Ternopil Oblast, Ukraine. Vyshnivchyk belongs to Zolotnyky rural hromada, one of the hromadas of Ukraine. Located on the western bank of the Strypa river. It neighbours the village of Zarvanytsia. Its existence was first mentioned in writings in 1564.

The village of Vyshnivchyk was part of Austrian Empire (until 1918), then again part of Poland (1918–1939), the Soviet Union (1944–1991) and since August 23, 1991 part of independent Ukraine.

It contains a school to which children from four surrounding villages (Haevuronka, Zarvanytsia, Kutoziv and Sapuva) come to get knowledge, together with the children from Vyshnivchik.

== History ==
At the time of World War II, Vyshnivchyk was under the control of the German army, and the neighboring village of Zarvanytsia was under the control of the Soviet army, as the Strypa river separated the two villages.

Until 18 July 2020, Vyshnivchyk belonged to Terebovlia Raion. The raion was abolished in July 2020 as part of the administrative reform of Ukraine, which reduced the number of raions of Ternopil Oblast to three. The area of Terebovlia Raion was merged into Ternopil Raion.

== Notable people ==
- Marcella Sembrich, soprano, teacher
- Heinrich Schenker, music theorist, teacher
- Olena Stepaniv, war hero
