= Philip Ewell =

American music theorist (born 1966)

Philip A. Ewell
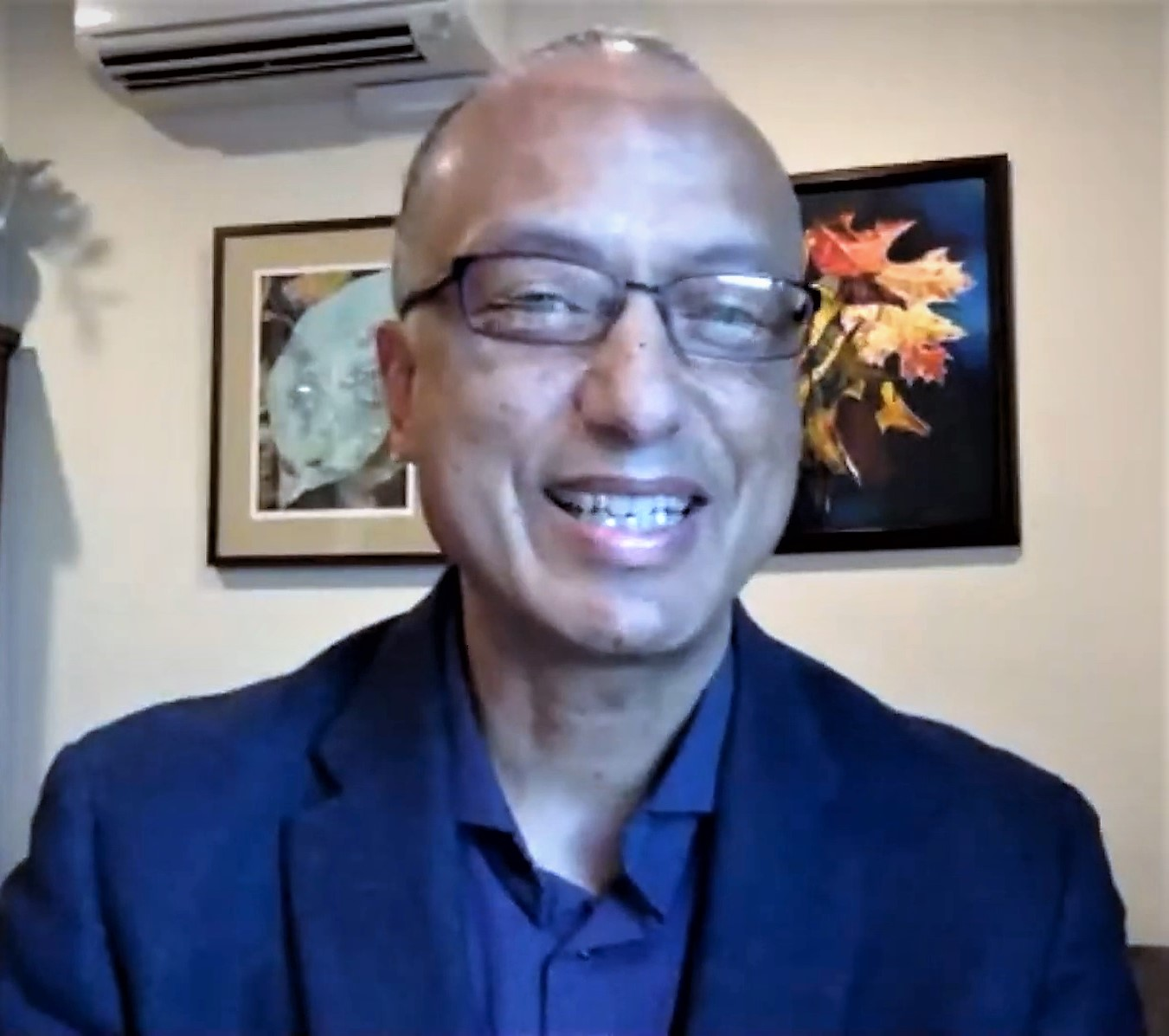
- Ewell in 2020
- Born: Philip Adrian Ewell; February 16, 1966 (age 60); DeKalb, Illinois
- Education: Ph.D., Yale University, 2001.
- Occupations: Music theorist, academic professor
- Employer(s): Hunter College, the City College of New York
- Spouse: Marina Vytovtova
- Website: philipewell.com

Philip Adrian Ewell (born February 16, 1966) is an American professor of music theory at Hunter College and the CUNY Graduate Center. He specializes in Russian and 20th-century music as well as rap and hip-hop. In 2019, he sparked controversy with his conference talk "Music Theory's White Racial Frame", leading to a debate on the racial politics of music theory and resulting in his 2023 book, "On Music Theory and Making Music More Welcoming for Everyone".

== Early life and education ==
Phillip Adrian Ewell was born on February 16, 1966, and grew up in DeKalb, Illinois. His father was an African American intellectual who had attended Morehouse College with Martin Luther King Jr. in 1948. Ewell received a BA in music from Stanford University, an MA in cello performance from Queens College (City University of New York), and a PhD in music theory from Yale University. His dissertation, Analytical Approaches to Large-Scale Structure in the Music of Alexander Scriabin, was advised by Allen Forte.

== Career ==
Ewell's published works include a number of articles on Russian music theory. He has translated Russian writings of and interviews with Russian theorists, such as Yuri Kholopov, and musicians, such as Vasya Oblomov. He has written about Russian composer Sofia Gubaidulina as well as Kendrick Lamar's To Pimp a Butterfly. His forthcoming works include a new undergraduate music theory textbook under contract with Norton and a book entitled On Music Theory under contract with the University of Michigan Press's Music and Social Justice series. He founded the music theory journal, Gamut, for the Music Theory Society of the Mid-Atlantic.

His public intellectual work has included appearances on BBC and Adam Neely's YouTube channel. In March 2021, Ewell contributed to RILM's blog in which he wrote about his Twitter project "Erasing colorasure in American music theory" and delivered a public colloquium at Columbia University entitled "On Confronting Music Theory's Antiblackness: Three Case Studies". As a result of Ewell's work with African American music culture, he became the editor of the newly launched Oxford University Press book series, Theorizing African American Music.

== Race and music theory ==
On November 9, 2019, at the 42nd annual meeting of the Society for Music Theory, Ewell participated in a plenary session entitled "Reframing Music Theory" which sought to "critique the confining frames within which [music theory] has been operating and explore ways in which to reframe what constitutes music theory". He presented a talk entitled "Music Theory's White Racial Frame". In his talk and in subsequent publications, Ewell argues that the "white racial frame" – a term coined by sociologist Joe Feagin – shapes knowledge practices in Western music theory and its institutions. Feagin defines the "white racial frame" as,

an overarching white worldview that encompasses a broad and persisting set of racial stereotypes, prejudices, ideologies, images, interpretations and narratives, emotions, and reactions to language accents, as well as racialized inclinations to discriminate.

Ewell's talk sparked the 2020 publication of fifteen responses in volume 12 of the Journal of Schenkerian Studies. The volume's contributing authors included the journal's co-founders Timothy L. Jackson and Stephen Slottow, as well as Charles Burkhart, Richard Beaudoin (Dartmouth College, assistant professor of music), Suzannah Clark, Nicholas Cook, and Jack Boss (University of Oregon, professor of music theory and composition), as well as "An Anonymous Response to Philip Ewell", which itself drew criticism.

Ewell's work on music theory's white racial frame—and the ensuing controversy from the 2020 publication of Journal of Schenkerian Studies' twelfth volume—has received wide-ranging media attention from Alex Ross at The New Yorker, The New York Times, NPR, and Inside Higher Ed. The Society for Music Theory's executive board stated that it "condemns the anti-Black statements and personal ad hominem attacks on Philip Ewell perpetuated in several essays included in the 'Symposium on Philip Ewell's 2019 SMT Plenary Paper' published by the Journal of Schenkerian Studies".

Ewell's publication has been criticized by black linguist and instructor of music history at Columbia University John McWhorter, who published the following in Substack:

"If Ewell's claim is that music is racist when involving hierarchical relationships between elements, then we must ask where that puts a great deal of music created by non-white people. Perhaps more important, the question is: just what do these hierarchical relationships in music structure have to do with human suffering?"

Ewell's recent book On Music Theory And Making Music More Welcoming for Everyone was also criticized by John McWhorter in The New York Times and by Don Baton in the City Journal. In Clifton Boyd and Jade Conlee's 2023 review, they argued that his book was less about Whiteness than about challenging the normative and canonical ways music theory has historically operated, offering the alternative subtitle, "How the Many Mythologies of the Western White-Male Musical Canon Have Created Hostile Environments for Those Who Do Not Identify as White Cisgender Men."

== Selected works ==
=== Books ===
- The Engaged Musician: Theory and Analysis for the Twenty-First Century (forthcoming, 2026) W. W. Norton Publishers.
- American Antiblackness (forthcoming, 2025) New York: Routledge.
- On Music Theory And Making Music More Welcoming for Everyone (2023) Ann Arbor: University of Michigan Press.
- Kaleidoscope of Cultures: A Celebration of Multicultural Research and Practice (2010) New York: Rowman & Littlefield.

=== Articles ===
- "Scriabin's Seventh Piano Sonata: Three Analytical Approaches." Indiana Theory Review 23: 23–67. (2002)
- "Scriabin's Dominant: The Evolution of a Harmonic Style." Journal of Schenkerian Studies 1: 118–48. (2006)
- "Anton Rubinstein, Alexander Serov, and Vladimir Stasov: The Struggle for a National Musical Identity in Nineteenth-Century Russia." Germano-Slavica XVI: 41–55. (2007)
- "Rethinking Octatonicism: Views from Stravinsky's Homeland." Music Theory Online 18 (4). ISSN 1067-3040. (2012)
- "'On the System of Stravinsky's Harmony,' by Yuri Kholopov: Translation and Commentary." Music Theory Online 19 (2). ISSN 1067-3040. (2013)
- "'I Can't Be Quiet': An Interview with Vasya Oblomov." Echo: A Music-Centered Journal 11 (1). (2013)
- "Russian Pitch-Class Set Analysis and the Music of Webern." Gamut: Online Journal of the Music Theory Society of the Mid-Atlantic 6 (1). (2013)
- "The Parameter Complex in the Music of Sofia Gubaidulina." Music Theory Online 20 (3). (2014)
- "Amerikanskaia teoriia riadov v perspektive" (American set theory in perspective). Muzykal'naia Akademiia (Music Academy) : 148–55. (2015)
- "Introduction to the Symposium on Kendrick Lamar's To Pimp a Butterfly." Music Theory Online 25 (1). doi:10.30535/mto.25.1.7. (2019)
- "Music Theory and the White Racial Frame". Music Theory Online. 26 (2). doi:10.30535/mto.26.2.4. ISSN 1067-3040. (2020)
- "Music Theory's White Racial Frame". Music Theory Spectrum. 43. doi:10.1093/mts/mtaa031. ISSN 0195-6167. (2021)

=== Dissertation ===
- - (2001). Analytical Approaches to Large-Scale Structure in the Music of Alexander Scriabin (PhD diss.). Yale University. OCLC 49527723.

=== Book chapters ===
- "Russian Rap in the Era of Vladimir Putin." In Hip-hop at Europe's Edge. Edited by Milosz Miszczynski and Adriana Helbig, 45–62. Bloomington: Indiana University Press. (2017)
- "Stravinsky Reception in the USSR". In Stravinsky in Context. Edited by Graham Griffiths. Cambridge University Press. pp. 270–78. doi:10.1017/9781108381086.037 OCLC 1232086933 ISBN 978-1-108-38108-6. (2020)

=== Edited books ===
- Kaleidoscope of Cultures: A Celebration of Multicultural Research and Practice. (2010). Edited by Marvelene C. Moore and Philip Ewell. Lanham: Rowman & Littlefield. OCLC 405107620

== Honors and awards ==
- PROSE Award, Association of American Publishers: “Music and Performing Arts” Category.
- 2022: Yale University's Wilbur Lucius Cross Medal
