= Timothy L. Jackson =

American music theorist (born 1958)

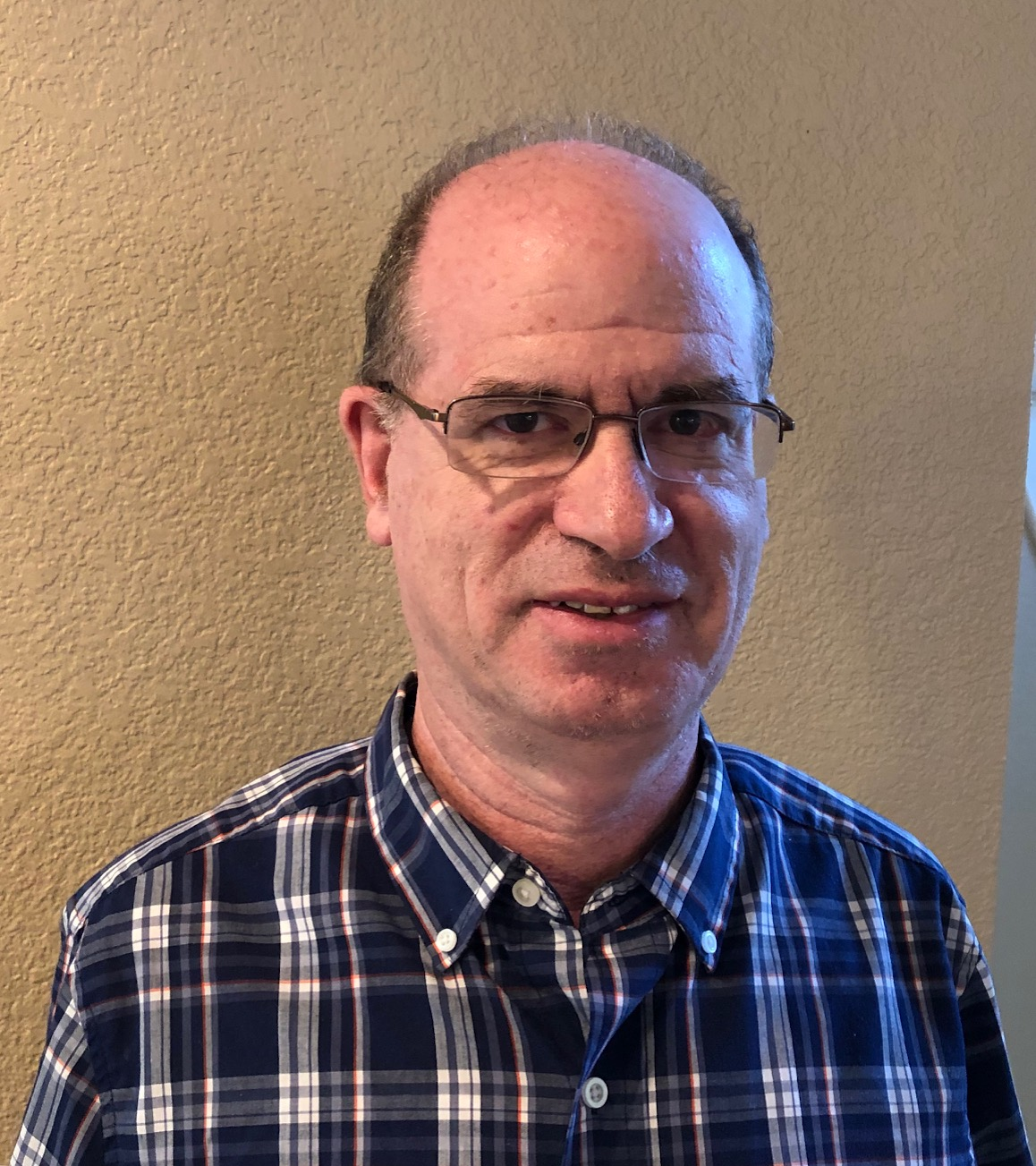
Jackson in 2021

Timothy L. Jackson (born 1958) is an American professor of music theory who has spent most of his career at the University of North Texas and specializes in music of the eighteenth through twentieth centuries, Schenkerian theory, politics and music. He is the co-founder of the Journal of Schenkerian Studies. In 2020, he became controversial for editing a special issue of that journal containing articles criticizing Philip Ewell's plenary talk "Music Theory's White Racial Frame".

== Early life and education ==
Jackson was born in Ottawa, Ontario, Canada, in 1958. Jackson received his B.A. in music in 1979 from McGill University in Montreal, Canada, his masters in music from Queens College, City University of New York; and his PhD in 1988 from the Graduate Center of the City University of New York in music theory. His dissertation, chaired by Professor Carl Schachter, was on "The Last Strauss: Studies of the Letzte Lieder".

== Career ==
Jackson was an assistant professor at Connecticut College from 1990 to 1997. He then became an assistant professor at the University of North Texas (UNT) in 1998 and was promoted to associate professor in 2001, full professor in 2005, and distinguished University research professor in 2011. He is one of the founding editors of the Journal of Schenkerian Studies, and has extensively published on late Romantic music, particularly on Bruckner, Brahms, and Sibelius.

== Journal of Schenkerian Studies issue 12 ==
In 2020-2021 Jackson was involved in a controversy in relation to issue 12 of the Journal of Schenkerian Studies, a special issue responding to a plenary talk at the Society for Music Theory (SMT) by Philip Ewell. The special issue was repudiated by the SMT's board of trustees, and drew mainstream press coverage. Jackson's management of the journal was criticized by graduate students for "platforming racist sentiments," as well as a "lack of peer review, publication of an anonymous response, and clear lack of academic rigor". On January 14, 2021, Jackson filed a lawsuit against eight members of the University of North Texas Board of Regents, seventeen faculty members in the Division of Music History, Theory, and Ethnomusicology, and one PhD student and teaching fellow, alleging violation of his First Amendment rights and defamation of character. After four years of litigation, the lawsuit finally settled in July 2025. In the settlement, Jackson received $725,000 from UNT in damages and legal costs plus full restoration of the Journal of Schenkerian Studies, plus full control over it." The Columbia Academic Freedom Council has recognized Dr. Jackson as one of 30 initial recipients of its Academic Freedom Prize, which "recognizes academics, students and teachers who have shown extraordinary courage in defending unorthodox or disfavored intellectual views."

== Publications ==
- 1989/1990. "Schoenberg's Op. 14 Songs: Textual Sources and Analytical Perception", Theory and Practice 14–15, pages 35–58.
- 1990. "Bruckner's Metrical Numbers", 19th-Century Music 14/2, pages 101–131.
- 1991. "Schubert's Revisions of Der Jüngling und der Tod, D 545a–b, and Meeresstille, D 216a–b", The Musical Quarterly 75/3, pages 336–361.
- 1992. Review: "Current Issues in Schenkerian Analysis", The Musical Quarterly 76/2, pages 242–263.
- 1992. "Gabriel Fauré's Expansions of Nonduple Hypermeter in La fleur qui va sur l'eau, Op. 85, No. 2", In Theory Only 12/3–4, pages 1–27.
- 1993. Review: "Arnold Schoenberg, the Composer as Jew", Theory and Practice 18, In Celebration of Arnold Schoenberg (2), pages 171–178.
- 1995. "Aspects of Sexuality and Structure in the Later Symphonies of Tchaikovsky", Music Analysis 14/1, pages 3–25.
- 1996. "The Tragic Reversed Recapitulation in the German Classical Tradition", Journal of Music Theory 40.1, pages 23–72.
- 1997. "'Your Songs Proclaim God's Return' – Arnold Schoenberg, the Composer and His Jewish Faith", International Journal of Musicology 6, pages 281–317.
- 1997. "The Finale of Bruckner's Seventh Symphony and the Tragic Reversed Sonata Form", Bruckner Studies, eds. Timothy L. Jackson and Paul Hawkshaw (Cambridge: Cambridge University Press), pages 209–255.
- 1997. "Bruckner's 'Oktaven'", Music & Letters 78/3, pages 391–409.
- 1998. "Dmitry Shostakovich: The Composer as Jew", Shostakovich Reconsidered, eds. Allan B. Ho and Dmitry Feofanov (London: Toccata Press), pages 597–640.
- 1999. Cambridge Handbook on Tchaikovsky's Sixth Symphony (Pathétique) (Cambridge: Cambridge University Press).
- 1999. "Diachronic Transformation in a Schenkerian Context: Brahms's Haydn Variations", Schenker Studies 2, eds. Carl Schachter and Hedi Siegel, (Cambridge: Cambridge University Press), pages 239–275.
- 2001. "The Adagio of the Sixth Symphony and the anticipatory tonic recapitulation in Bruckner, Brahms and Dvořák", Perspectives on Anton Bruckner, eds. Timothy L. Jackson, Paul Hawkshaw (Yale), and Crawford Howie (Manchester), (London: Ashgate Press).
- 2001. Sibelius Studies, eds. Timothy L. Jackson and Veijo Murtomäki (Sibelius Academy), (Cambridge: Cambridge University Press).
- 2001. "The Schenker–Oppel Exchange: Schenker as Composition Teacher", Music Analysis 20/1, pages 1–116.
- 2001. "Bruckner" in The New Grove Dictionary of Music and Musicians, ed. S. Sadie and J. Tyrrell (London: Macmillan)
- 2006. "Hinauf strebt's: Song Study with Carl Schachter", Structure and Meaning in Tonal Music, eds. L. Poundie Burstein and David Gagné (Festschrift in Honor of Carl Schachter), pages 191–202.
- 2009. "Escaping from a Black Hole: Facing Depression in Academia", Music Theory Online 15/3–4.
- 2010. Sibelius in the Old and New World: Aspects of His Music, Its Interpretation, and Reception, eds. Timothy L. Jackson and Veijo Murtomäki (Peter Lang: New York).
- 2015. "The 'Pseudo-Einsatz' in Two Handel Fugues: Heinrich Schenker's Analytical Work with Reinhard Oppel", Bach to Brahms. Essays on Musical Design and Structure, eds. David Beach and Yosef Goldenberg (University of Rochester Press), pages 173–203.
- 2016. "The First Movements of Anton Eberl's Symphonies in E-flat major and D minor, and Beethoven's Eroica: Toward 'New' Sonata Forms?", Explorations in Schenkerian Analysis, eds. David Beach and Su Yin Mak (Eastman Studies in Music, University of Rochester Press), pages 61–96.
- 2024. "'A true and genuine music': Berg's linear counterpoint", Rivista di Analisi e Teoria Musicale XXX/1, pp. 7-91.
