= Santa Claus Bank Robbery =

1927 bank robbery in Texas

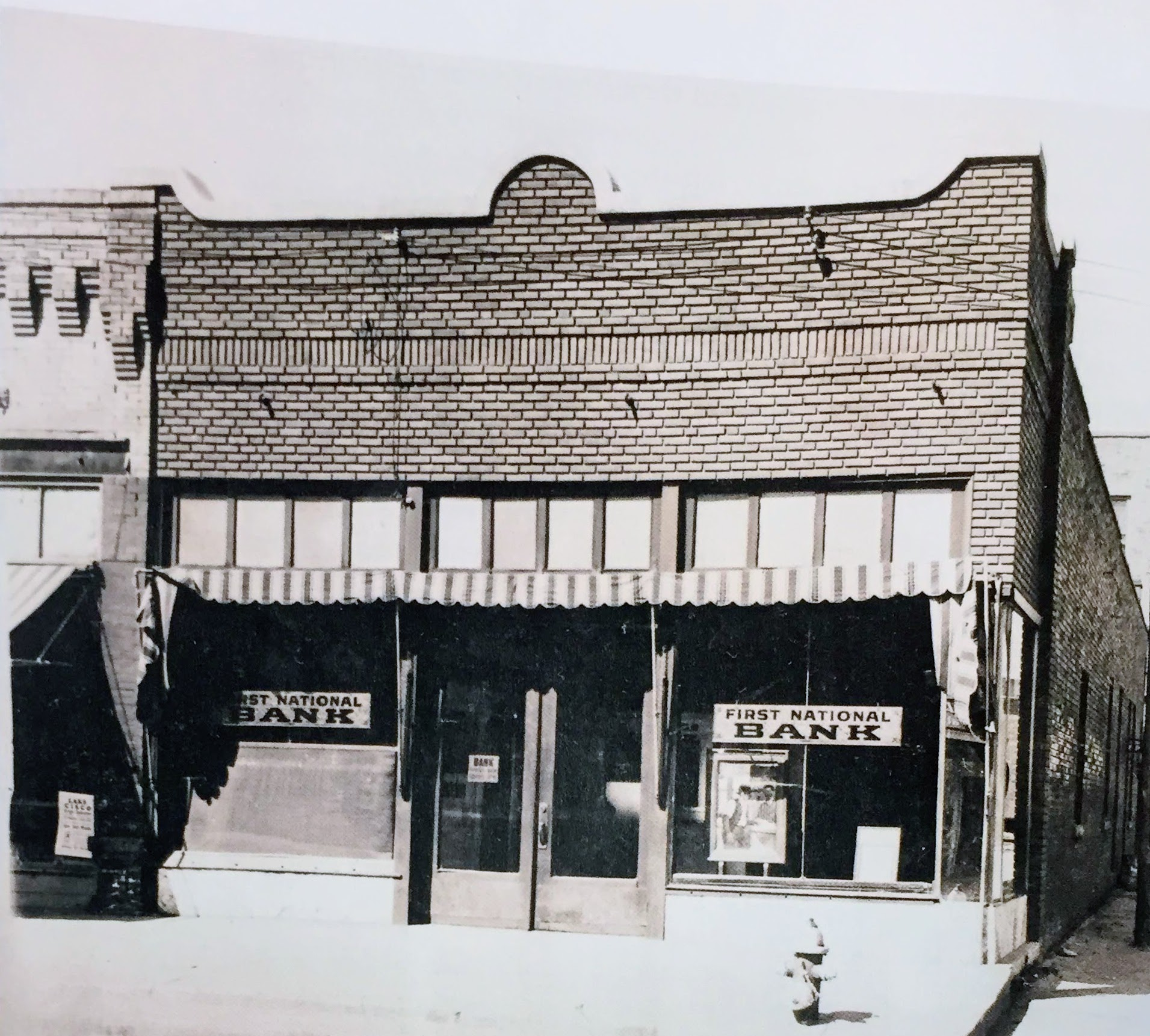
The First National Bank of Cisco as it looked in 1927

The Santa Claus Bank Robbery occurred on December 23, 1927, in the Central Texas town of Cisco. Marshall Ratliff, dressed as Santa Claus, along with Henry Helms and Robert Hill, all ex-cons, and Louis Davis, a relative of Helms, held up the First National Bank in Cisco. The robbery is one of Texas' most infamous crimes, having invoked the largest manhunt ever seen in the state. Boyce House, editor of the Ranger Times, a newspaper in the county at the time, wrote that this was "the most spectacular crime in the history of the Southwest ... surpassing any in which Billy the Kid or the James boys had ever figured."

== Background ==
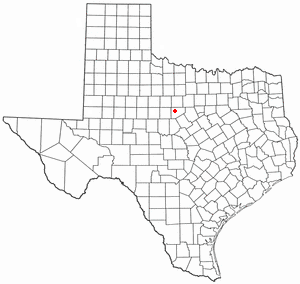
Location of Cisco, Texas

Marshall Ratliff was an ex-con who had lived in Cisco before being tracked down and imprisoned for a bank robbery in Valera, Texas. Though Ratliff was given an 18-year prison sentence, after only two years Governor Miriam "Ma" Ferguson pardoned him. It was just one of the 3,595 pardons Ferguson granted—under the lingering suspicion that most of the concessions were bought. Ratliff immediately began plans to rob his hometown bank. He initially planned to enlist his brother, Lee, but Lee had been arrested again. Ratliff pulled in Helms and Hill, whom he knew from Huntsville, and a fourth man who was good with safes.

== Robbery ==
=== Planning ===
As they planned the crime in Wichita Falls, the safe-cracker came down with the flu, and the trio pulled in Davis, a relative of Helms and a family man in need, promising a large return for his participation.

During this period in Texas, an average of four banks were being robbed every day, and in response, the Texas Bankers Association announced that anyone who killed a bank robber would be awarded $5,000, valued at $85,000 in today's currency. This made the heist a particularly dangerous undertaking for the four men.

Ratliff knew that he would be immediately recognized if he returned to Cisco. Since the heist was planned for late December, he planned to conceal his identity by disguising himself as Santa Claus. He borrowed a Santa beard and costume made by Josephine Herron, who ran the boarding house where they had been staying in Wichita Falls. (In A. C. Greene's 1972 book on the robbery, he changed her name to Midge Tellet, and that fictional name has appeared in some accounts since then.) Stealing a car in Wichita Falls, they headed for Cisco and arrived on the morning of December 23.

As the group entered Cisco, Ratliff donned the Santa Claus beard and suit and instructed the gang to drop him off a few blocks from the bank and get the car in position. The plan was to park the car where the wide alley beside the bank met Avenue D (the main street). The gang would then follow Ratliff into the bank, take the money, exit through a side alleyway door to their waiting car.

One day before Christmas Eve, no one thought it odd when Santa came walking down the street around noon. When children saw Ratliff dressed as Santa Claus, they surrounded him. He answered their questions and tried to appear friendly as he nudged the crowd toward the bank. He was able to disperse the children before entering the bank.

=== Bank heist ===
Once inside, Ratliff saw four men: two bank employees (Alex Spears and Mr. Jewell Poe) and two customers (Marion Olson and Oscar Cliett). He received a pleasant greeting of "Hello, Santa," but he did not respond, distracted by two fourth-grade girls entering the lobby from the bookkeeping room (Emma Mae Robinson and Laverne Comer). Then a bank patron, Mrs. B. P. Blasengame entered the bank, pulled along by her six-year-old daughter, Frances, who wanted to see Santa.

Ratliff's accomplices then entered the bank, pointing pistols and shouting, "Hands up!"

"Santa" ordered the teller to open the safe, and began stuffing money and bonds into a sack he had hidden beneath his costume. While the others covered the customers and employees, Ratliff grabbed money from the tellers and forced one to open the vault.

Mrs. Blasengame escaped with her daughter through the bookkeeping office and the alleyway door, shouting, "They are robbing the bank!" She ran the one block to the police department, alerting Chief of Police Bedford and most of the Cisco citizenry about the robbery.

According to Boyce House, "Police Chief G.E. "Bit" Bedford [was] a giant of a man and a veteran peace officer." Seizing a riot gun, he started for the scene and instructed officers R.T. "Rio" Redies and George Carmichael to join him. The chief posted himself at the front of the alley while his two officers took a position at the back of the alley.

When the bandits realized the bank was surrounded, they gathered their hostages and entered the back room with the alleyway door, where they found two bookkeepers (Vance Littleton and Freda Stroebel). The bandits were unable to enter the alley without drawing withering fire from the officers and a growing crowd of armed citizens. But they now had eight hostages, including the fourth-grade girls, and the bandits used them as shields to enter the alleyway.

=== Shoot out ===
Despite the human shields, a fusillade of gunfire began, wounding the four bandits and a few of the hostages as well. But the robber gang made it to their car and drove out of town with the two little girls. In the melee, police chief "Bit" Bedford and one of his deputies, George Carmichael, lay in the alley with mortal wounds. Bedford died several hours later, and Carmichael died two weeks later, on Sunday, January 8, 1928. Six other civilians were wounded.

=== Getaway and manhunt ===
As the four robbers began their getaway, traveling south on Avenue D with their hostages, they tossed out roofing nails in an effort to puncture the tires of the posse's machines. The tactic proved useful, but only briefly, because they soon realized that they were almost out of gas. Their tank had been punctured by bullets or they had simply forgotten to fill the tank after the long ride from Wichita Falls to Cisco. As they neared the edge of town, pursued by the mob, they decided to commandeer a passing Oldsmobile driven by 14-year-old Woodrow Wilson Harris, who had been allowed to drive the family into town for some last-minute Christmas shopping. His father sat beside him, and his mother and grandmother were in the back seat. At gunpoint, the family relinquished the car. In the midst of gunfire by the pursuers, the robbers transferred the loot and hostages and the severely-injured Louis Davis to the Oldsmobile. But when they had finally transferred themselves to the new getaway car, only then did they realize that they could not start the car because Harris had cleverly taken the keys from the ignition when ordered to stop. Davis was by then unconscious, so they left him in the car and moved back to the first car with their two hostages.

It was later determined that the gang had stolen $12,400 in cash and $150,000 in nonnegotiable securities. This would have made it the largest Texas bank heist to that date had they not accidentally left it all behind in the confusion. The lawmen and citizens found the bag of loot in the abandoned Harris car with the badly wounded Louis Davis.

The three remaining bandits and their two little hostages raced south on Avenue D, and swung east onto a dirt road. They then turned into a pasture, dashing through cactus, mesquite, and scrub oak. The growth became so heavy that further progress was impossible, and the robbers abandoned their bullet-riddled car and the two hostages several miles from town and continued on foot.

Sheriff John Hart and his deputies of Eastland, the county seat, had been called by long distance and given the news of the bank robbery; they piled into automobiles and sped to the spot where the bandits had abandoned the car. Reporters, including Boyce House, followed the action in another vehicle. By House's account, "officers and citizens poured in from all that section of the state and such a manhunt as Western Texas had never seen before was soon in progress .... Many members of the posse were on horseback or on foot as they beat their way through clumps of trees, searched high grass in the bottoms of ravines and peered around boulders in canyons." One search party discovered an overcoat and bloodstained gloves. Later, citizens found a suitcase and a pile of bloodstained rags. In the suitcase were cotton and gauze, showing that the bandits had entered their enterprise with the knowledge that there might be shedding of blood.

Unable to find the bandits as evening set on the day of the robbery, the pursuit continued the next day, Saturday, December 24.

For Davis, who was a last-minute replacement for the group, this was the only crime in his lifetime. On Christmas Day, he died from the gunshot wounds he received in the gunbattle at the bank.

The evening of Christmas Day, the three remaining bandits successfully commandeered a vehicle driven by Carl Wylie, a young driller, forcing him as their hostage to drive. During the seizure, Mr. Wylie's father fired his shotgun after the fleeing car. The shot struck his son.

After hiding out all night with nothing to eat but oranges, which they did not offer to the injured young hostage, Helms, Hill, and Ratliff stole another car and released Wylie and his vehicle. Wylie later reported to the authorities that the bandits were doing very poorly due to their injuries, lack of food, and the icy, sleeting conditions.

The next morning, as they tried to cross the Brazos River in the little town of South Bend in Young County, officers spotted the single-seated machine with three occupants approaching. The bandits began backing rapidly down the road. Then, as the members of the posse scurried into their automobiles, the car whirled and rushed away. A car chase followed, with a shootout in an oil field as the three tried to escape, running toward the wells.

Involved in the firefight was Deputy Sheriff Cy Bradford, who later served as a Texas Ranger. Before Bradford's car had rolled to a stop, he was out with "Old Betsy," his double-barreled shotgun, an extra pair of shells in one hand. Bradford fired once and one of the fugitives fell. Bradford reloaded before firing again. "I did not want to be caught with an empty gun if they turned and made a stand," he explained afterward. The bandits ran on, firing back over their shoulders. Again, Bradford shot, and a man went down, but arose and staggered on. The officer shoved the other shell into the gun and shot again, and the third desperado slumped to his knees, but got up and reeled on, disappearing among the derricks. Ratliff was hit and fell to the ground while Helms and Hill, although wounded, escaped into the woods by the Brazos River, which offered ideal concealment. Ratliff was reportedly a "walking arsenal", bearing no fewer than six gunshot wounds and six pistols when captured, including the one he took from the bank. "Santa" had been caught.

== Capture ==
The intense manhunt for Helms and Hill, directed by Ranger Captain Tom Hickman, and Ranger Sergeant L.T. "Lone Wolf" Gonzallaus, with more than 100 men of a posse, including nearly 50 officers pressed on so as not to allow the wounded men an opportunity for rest. Despite airplane assistance, the search team could not spot the fleeing men. In the process, two more men were wounded from accidental discharge of their weapons, bringing the total number of wounded to nine, excluding the three surviving robbers. However, their trail was eventually picked up and the end of the chase evidently was not far because the footprints were close spaced, showing that they were wearing from the long chase and weak from loss of blood. Marks showed that, to climb even a small rise, they had been forced to crawl. They were finally apprehended in Graham, Texas, on December 30, seven days after the bank robbery. They had been attempting to find the location of a rooming house in Graham, but the man from whom they asked directions noticed their pistols and notified the authorities. Presumably exhausted, the two were taken into custody without a fight. Hill was captured with three pistols, and Helms with four.

== Trials and sentences ==
Controversy surrounded the "Dead Bank Robber" reward from the start, most publicly from legendary Ranger Frank Hamer, who called it "the bankers' murder machine." Attorneys for Ratliff and Helms used the mixed public opinion in their defense, claiming it forced the bandits to take desperate measures to save themselves.

Ratliff was the first to go to trial for armed robbery, which resulted in a life sentence.

Helms, a pastor's son, stood trial after Ratliff and was given the death sentence, which his lawyer appealed.

Hill pled guilty, and at his sentencing trial, his court-appointed attorney had him take the stand to describe his boyhood as an orphan growing up as a foster child at the Gatesville State School for Boys, a reformatory for criminally convicted minors that also served as foster care for some children. The jury gave him a life sentence instead of the death penalty.

When Ratliff faced another trial in Eastland County, this time for his contribution in the death of the two lawmen, his lawyer asked for a change of venue. The trial for the death of George "Bit" Bedford was transferred to Abilene and his trial for the death of George Carmichael was transferred to the small town of Anson. The Abilene jury gave him the death sentence and the Anson jury gave him a second life sentence.

While on death row, waiting for his death sentence appeal to be heard, Ratliff's mother gave him a wind-up phonograph and a stack of gospel records. As condemned men passed his cell on their way to the electric chair, he would play "When the Roll is Called Up Yonder." In 1928-1929, seven men heard his impromptu death march, but he didn't play it when Henry Helms passed his cell on the way to the death chamber on September 6, 1929.

Henry Helms attempted to avoid the electric chair by feigning insanity. He followed the lead of Harry Leahy, a former lawyer condemned for the brutal torture and killing of a physician, who had unsuccessfully attempted this ploy in July 1929. It took only ten minutes of deliberation for an Eastland County jury to determine he was sane enough to be executed by electric chair. He was executed as scheduled on September 6, 1929, and his family did not claim the body, leaving it to the state to bury it in the prison cemetery that convicts derisively called "Peckerwood Hill."

== Lynching ==
Ratliff began acting insane on the day of Helms's execution, and his mother, Rilla Carter, filed for a lunacy hearing in Huntsville.

The citizens of Eastland County, already infuriated that Ratliff's execution had been delayed for so long, were further aggravated by this new development. A judge ordered Ratliff be extradited to Eastland County jail, writing a bench warrant for armed robbery of the Harris' Oldsmobile.

His insanity ploy was more convincing than the attempts of Leahy and Helms, which led his jailers, Pack Kilborn and Tom Jones, to let down their guard. On November 18, 1929, Ratliff escaped his unlocked cell and managed to get hold of a six-shooter in the prison office. He fatally wounded Jones, and violently fought Kilborn. The jailer beat Ratliff into unconsciousness, then returned him to his cell.

A crowd began to gather the next morning, and by nightfall, had grown to nearly 1,000. It is not clear that all of them were clamoring for Ratliff to be handed over to them, but 15 to 20 men broke into the jail and dragged Ratliff out. They threw a rope over a guy-wire between two telephone poles, on which they intended to hang him. The first attempt failed when the rope broke, and he fell to the ground. The second time, however, they used a stronger rope and were successful at ending the life of the man who had robbed the Cisco bank dressed as Santa almost two years earlier.

Several thousand persons viewed Ratliff's body the next day at a furniture store in Eastland before a judge ordered the corpse to be hidden from view. A grand jury was formed to investigate the illegal lynching, but no one was ever tried for it. Ratliff's mother took possession of the body and arranged for a funeral in Fort Worth. As his body was transferred to the hearse for transport to the burial at Olivet Cemetery, a Santa Claus leading a Christmas parade happened to pass by to promote a store's holiday sales.

== Surviving bandit ==
A reporter for the Associated Press covering Robert Hill's 1928 trial referred to him as "the Jean Valjean of the Santa Claus robbery." The Eastland County jury was sympathetic to his lawyer's portrayal of him as "the boy who never stood a chance." He had been orphaned at eight and was raised in the Gatesville State School for Boys, which served as a foster home for some boys as well as a reformatory for boys sentenced for crimes. After aging out of the foster system as a teenager, he was arrested for a petty theft, to which he pled guilty. He was given a two-year sentence in Huntsville, where he met Marshall Ratliff. As a participant in the Cisco bank robbery, the jury gave him a 99-year sentence, and he promised the judge and jury he would "make a good prisoner."

At first, he did not keep this promise. Prison breaks were common at the time—over three hundred men were involved in breakouts in 1929 alone. Robert Hill joined three escape attempts, but he was captured each time.

His first brief break for freedom was off a work detail while clearing a field.

On his second escape, he and two others followed Bob Silver, a popular vocal performer who recently had his death sentence commuted to life behind bars. They kidnapped a male and female student from the Sam Houston State Teachers College and forced them to drive them to Houston, where the convicts kept the car but released the students unharmed.

His third break came when he joined over a dozen men through a sixty-to-eighty-foot tunnel that began under the kitchen of a work farm and exited beyond the fence. He was on the lam for eighteen months after his last escape but was captured in El Paso in 1931 while attempting to cross into Mexico.

Eastland County tried him a second time for the Cisco bank robbery, this time for the murder of the two police officers. The trial resulted in a hung jury, and he was returned to the prison system to complete his life sentence.

He did not attempt any more escapes, and Governor Coke Stephenson granted him a conditional pardon in 1945, only fifteen years into his life sentence. The first newspaper reference to his release came in 1947, in a story commemorating the twentieth anniversary of the Santa Claus Robbery. Presley Bryant, a reporter for the Fort Worth Star-Telegram, reported that, since November 13, 1945, Hill "has been under a conditional pardon, granted by Governor Stevenson, after he had been given two one-year extensions of his reprieve. He was paroled to the Rusk County parole board and has been under the supervision of the board chairman, M.G Wright at Henderson. He is employed as a warehouseman by a construction firm in Smith County, has been married three years and is a stepfather, has acquired a home and has joined a church."

The Board of Pardons and Paroles has no record of why they advised the governor to pardon Hill only fifteen years into his life sentence. In The Last Man: A Novel of the 1927 Santa Claus Bank Robbery, Thomas Goodman speculated that the decision was the result of both Hill's personal reform and society's need for laborers in factories and farms while so many American men were overseas during the Second World War.

Whatever motivated the Board to recommend his parole, Hill made the best of it, and Governor John Connally replaced his conditional pardon with a full pardon in 1964. By the time Hill died in 1996, he had been a married model citizen for fifty years. Some reports speculate that he changed his name, but the December 1947 Presley Bryant article already referenced included the fact that his employers "have known his identity since he went to work for them."

== Legacy ==
Many people in and from Eastland County have claimed to have relatives who were present at the robbery or the lynching, and it is now a part of local folklore. In 1967, the Texas State Historical Survey Committee (now the Texas Historical Commission) placed a medallion at the site of the bank robbery in Cisco, and a granite marker across from the Eastland County Jail marks the spot where Marshall Ratliff was lynched. The First National Bank, now Prosperity Bank, features a painting of Cisco history, which includes a depiction of the robbery.

Boyce House was the first to gather the facts into a single published piece, and Startling Detective Adventures magazine published his article in March 1930.

In 1958, J.W. Sitton released the first book on the robbery, titled The Santa Claus Bank Robbery. In 1984, the Fort Worth Star-Telegram called it "the most accurate narrative available."

In 1972, Abilene journalist A.C. Greene published a book mixed with fact and fiction called The Santa Claus Bank Robbery.

In the 1990s, when the screenwriter and director, John Lee Hancock, was starting out in the film business, he wrote a screenplay about the bank robbery and the lynching, but it was not picked up by a studio.

In 2005, playwright Billy Smith wrote and directed a musical called The Great Santa Claus Bank Robbery, which was performed in a Cisco, Texas, dinner theater.

In 2009, Julie Williams Coley included a chapter on the crime in her independently published book, How Did They Die? Murders in Northern Texas 1892-1927. Although several dates do not align with the newspaper record, Coley's book is a helpful resource for those looking for the family relations of the bandits.

In 2011, T. Lindsay Baker included a chapter on the Santa Claus Robbery in his book, Gangster Tour of Texas. Researchers will appreciate Baker's careful documentation, photos, and maps to the locations of key moments in the story.

In 2019, Tui Snider released a 152-page book through Amazon called Santa Claus Bank Robbery: A True Crime Saga in Texas. In her report, following Billy Smith's dinner theater play, Snider suggested that the robbery included a blonde woman accomplice.

In 2023, Thomas Goodman released The Last Man: A Novel of the 1927 Santa Claus Bank Robbery, taking the known details about Robert Hill and speculating on what led to his reform.
