= Alkek Library =

Architectural centerpiece and intellectual hub of the Texas State University

Albert B. Alkek Library
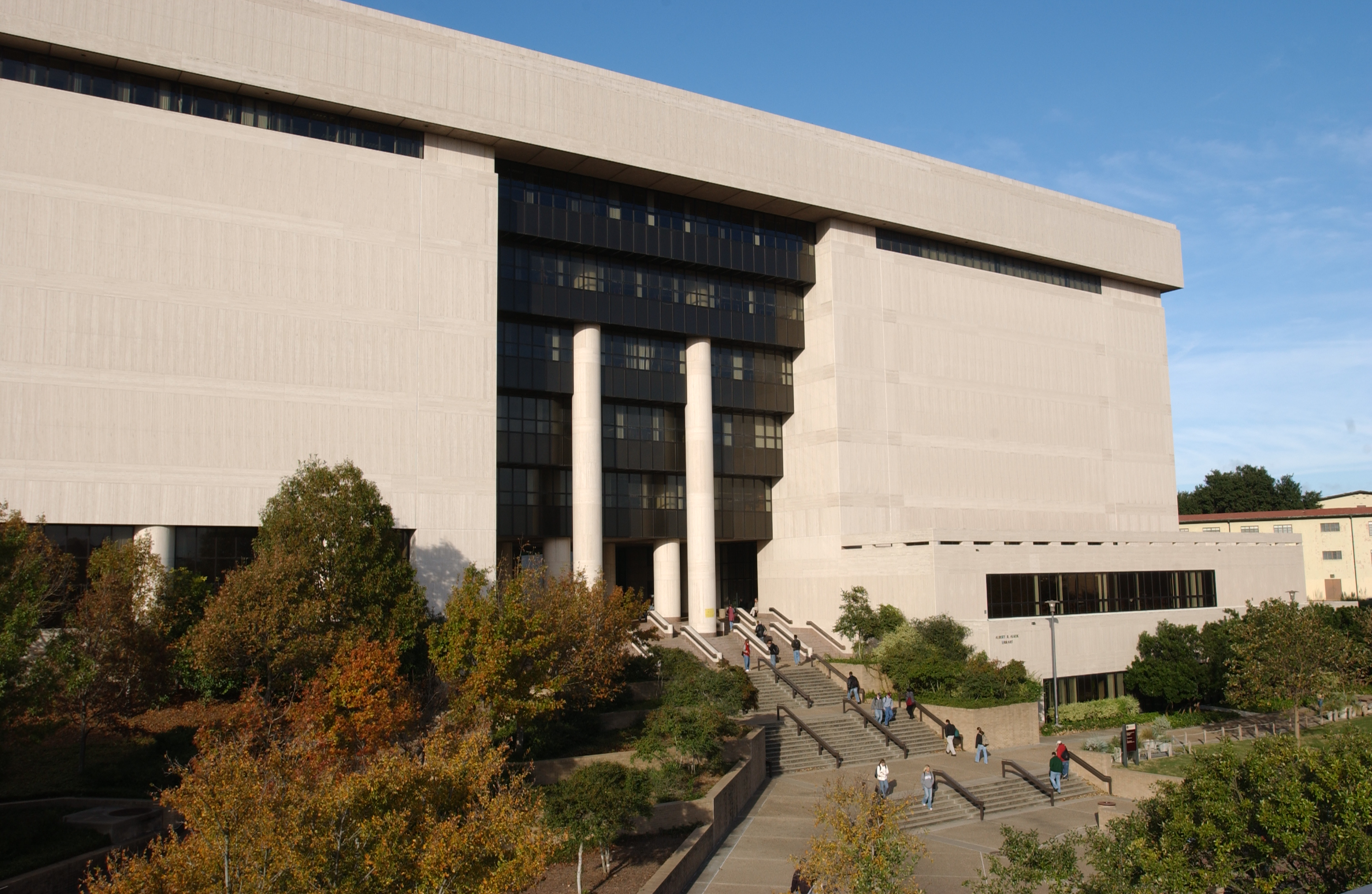
- TXST University Libraries
- 29.8891°N 97.9431°W
- Location: San Marcos, Texas, United States
- Type: Academic library

Other information
- Affiliation: Texas State University
- Website: www.library.txstate.edu

The Albert B. Alkek Library is the library and intellectual hub of the Texas State University San Marcos campus. The Wittliff Collections of Southwestern Writers and Southwestern & Mexican Photography and Texas Music is located on the seventh floor of the Alkek Library.

The university's library was named, in 1991, for oilman, rancher, and philanthropist, alumnus Albert B. Alkek. The Albert B. Alkek Library serves as the main, central academic library supporting the Texas State University (formerly Southwest Texas State University) community. As a storehouse for United States and Texas government documents, the library receives a large number of government publications from the state and 60% of all federal publications. The mission of the library, as stated by University Officials, "is to advance the teaching and research mission of the University and support students, faculty, staff and the greater community by providing patron-centered services, comprehensive and diverse collections, individual and collaborative learning environments, innovative technologies, and opportunities to explore, create and discover."

The Library's collection includes the Wittliff Collections housed on the Library's seventh floor, the King of the Hill archives, major work of significant writers such as Cormac McCarthy, Sandra Cisneros and Sam Shepard, and the Lonesome Dove collection.

== Accessing the Library ==
The library's online catalog allows anyone to locate books, DVDs, journal holdings or other material. Library materials are in many cases accessible to the general public. Many Texas residents (not just Texas State students, faculty, and staff) are able to check out materials through the TexShare program. Access to e-books or databases is limited to current Texas State students, staff and faculty. Creative technologies are located on the 1st floor and assist faculty and students with audio and video production and editing; GIS and geospatial applications; virtual, augmented, and mixed reality, 3D printing and maker space fabrications; and 2D and 3D content creation.
