= Theoria (music journal) =

- Discipline: Music theory
- Language: English
- Edited by: Frank Heidlberger

Publication details
- History: 1985–present
- Publisher: University of North Texas Press

Standard abbreviations
- ISO 4: Theoria (Denton, Tex.)

Indexing
- ISSN: 1554-1312

Links
- Journal homepage

Theoria: Historical Aspects of Music Theory is a peer-reviewed academic journal specializing in music theory and analysis. It was established in 1985, under the auspices of the University of North Texas College of Music. According to its website, "Theoria is a peer-reviewed journal on all aspects of history in music theory. This includes critical articles representing the current stage of research, and editions of newly discovered or mostly unknown theoretical texts with translation and commentary." The journal's first editor in chief was Mark McCune. It is currently edited by Frank Heidlberger. In 2017, volume 24 was published. Publisher since volume 13 is the University of North Texas Press.
