= Keith Carter (photographer) =

American photographer (born 1948)

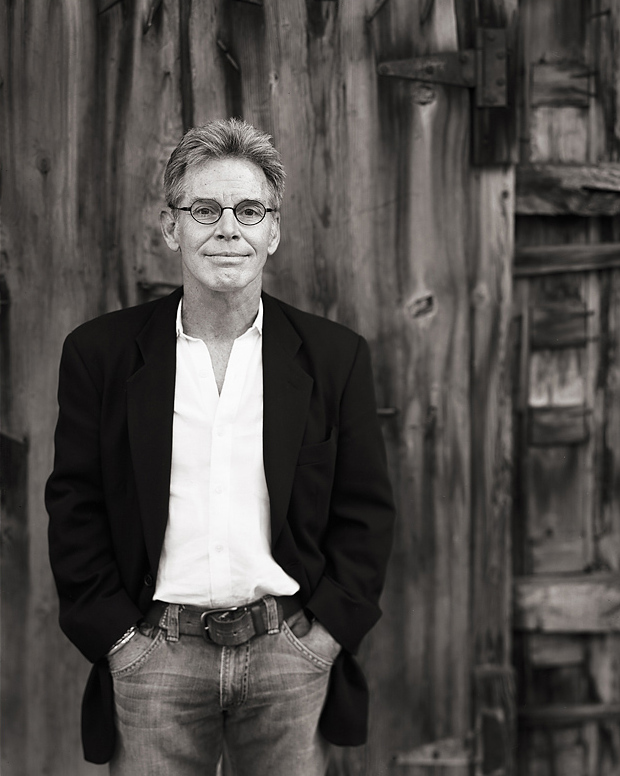
Keith Carter

Keith Carter (June 3, 1948, Madison, Wisconsin) is an American photographer, educator, and artist noted for his dreamlike photos of people, animals and objects.

== Early life and education ==
At the age of three, Keith Carter's family moved to Beaumont, Texas where, soon after arriving, his father left and his mother worked as a professional photographer of children.

Carter earning a degree in business administration from Lamar University in Beaumont.

== Photography career ==
In 1970, Carter began working on personal photographs as well as commercial photography.

A month long trip in 1973 to New York's Museum of Modern Art to study their permanent collection three days each week heightened an already intense interest in the art of photography. A chance meeting with playwright and National Medal of Arts winner Horton Foote, focused his observations on his native East Texas as an exotic land.

In the beginning, when he was trying to find a direction for his works he said, “I became Walker Evans because his photographs looked a lot like where I lived.” He read James Agee's and Walker Evans' Let Us Now Praise Famous Men. At the same time he began being influenced by popular Southern writers such as: Harper Lee, William Goyen, Reynolds Price, Flannery O’Connor, William Faulkner, and Eudora Welty, which made him love the South and its storytelling traditions.

His early photographs were based on stories "I had heard or read, black folk tales of dog ghosts and bottle trees, the wonder of children, and using my own white Anglo-Saxon Protestant background, I tried to weave glimpses into what I found instructive, eloquent, and enduring".

Lauded as "a transcendent realist" and "a poet of the ordinary," Keith Carter is a photographer whose work has been shown in over one hundred solo exhibitions in thirteen countries. Carter first found his subjects in the familiar, yet exotic, places and people of his native East Texas. For the past two decades he has expanded his range not only geographically, but also into realms of dreams and imagination, where objects of the mundane world open glimpses into ineffable realities.

Carter explores relationships that are timeless, enigmatic, and mythological. Drawing from the animal world, popular culture, folklore, and religion, Carter presents photographs that attempt to reflect hidden meanings in the real world. Carter makes photographs addressing the relationship we have to our ideas of place, time, memory, desire, and regret. He examines at times, the history of photography as well as our own shared histories.

His commitment to long term personal projects has resulted in the publication of fourteen monographs including FROM UNCERTAIN TO BLUE (1988), THE BLUE MAN (1990), MOJO (1992), HEAVEN OF ANIMALS (1996), BONES (1996), KEITH CARTER-TWENTY FIVE YEARS (1997), HOLDING VENUS (2000), EZEKIEL'S HORSE (2000), TWO SPIRITS (with * Mauro Fiorese) (2001), OPERA NUDA (2006), DREAM A PLACE OF DREAMS (with * Mauro Fiorese) (2008), A CERTAIN ALCHEMY (2008), FIREFLIES: PHOTOGRAPHS OF CHILDREN (2009), KEITH CARTER - FIFTY YEARS (2018). In addition, Carter's editorial work has included cds, albums, book jackets, and over 6000 portraits of children.

== Educator ==
Today, Carter is teaching photography at Lamar University, where he is Regents Professor and holds the Endowed Walles Chair of Visual and Performing Arts. Carter has been awarded the university's highest teaching honors, the Distinguished Faculty Lecturer Award and University Professor Award. In addition he conducts workshops and seminars in the United States, Latin America, and Europe.

== Collections ==
In addition to his books, Carter's photographs are included in a great many public and private collections; including the Art Institute of Chicago, President and Mrs. Barack Obama, Smithsonian American Art Museum, National Gallery of Art, George Eastman House, J. Paul Getty Museum, Museum of Fine Arts, Houston, San Francisco Museum of Modern Art, Richard M. Ross Art Museum, and the Wittliff Gallery of Southwestern and Mexican Photography at Texas State University.

== Awards ==
In 1991 Carter received the Lange-Taylor Prize from the Center for Documentary Studies at Duke University.

== Publications ==
- From Uncertain To Blue (1988)
- The Blue Man (1990)
- Mojo (1992) ISBN 978-0-89263-335-7
- Heaven of Animals (1995)
- Bones (1996) ISBN 978-0-8118-1282-5
- Keith Carter Photographs — 25 Years (1997) ISBN 978-0-292-71195-2
- Holding Venus (2000) ISBN 978-1-892041-24-1
- Ezekiel's Horse (2000) ISBN 978-0-292-71229-4
- Two Spirits: Keith Carter and Mauro Fiorese (2002) ISBN 978-88-370-2017-0
- Opera Nuda (2006) ISBN 978-1-888899-25-2
- "Dream of A PLACE of Dreams" (with Mauro Fiorese) (2008) ISBN 978-88-902023-7-7
- A Certain Alchemy (2008) ISBN 978-0-292-71908-8
- Fireflies: Photographs of Children (2009) ISBN 0-292-72182-X
- Uncertain to Blue (Rerelease 2012)
- Keith Carter - Fifty Years (2018) University of Texas Press, Austin, Texas ISBN 978-1-4773-1801-0

== General references ==
- Wittliff, Bill. “The Illustionist.”Texas Monthly Magazine. September 2008
- "Belong to a Place", Jane McBride (March 12, 2006) The Beaumont Enterprise.
- "The Photographers Series: Keith Carter", John Spellos (May 1, 2006) Anthropy Arts
- A Certain Alchemy (October 2008), University of Texas Press
