= Glossary of Schenkerian analysis =

This is a glossary of Schenkerian analysis, a method of musical analysis of tonal music based on the theories of Heinrich Schenker (1868–1935). The method is discussed in the concerned article and no attempt is made here to summarize it. Similarly, the entries below whenever possible link to other articles where the concepts are described with more details (in several cases, the name of the entry links to a specialized article), and the definitions are kept here to a minimum.

== A ==
Anstieg

See Initial ascent.

Arpeggiation (German: Brechung)

Elementary elaboration of a harmony. See also Bass arpeggiation; First-order arpeggiation; Unfolding.

Ausfaltung

See Unfolding.

Auskomponierung

See Prolongation.

Außensatz

See Fundamental structure.

== B ==
Background (German: Hintergrund)

The structural level of the fundamental structure. See also Middleground and Foreground.

Bass arpeggiation (German: Bassbrechung)

Bass pattern I-V-I forming the harmonic content of the background of tonal musical pieces; the concept belongs to the final version of Schenkerian theory, from 1930 onwards. See also Schenkerian analysis: The arpeggiation of the bass.

Bassbrechung

See Bass arpeggiation.

Brechung

See Arpeggiation.

== C ==
Chord of nature

See Klang.

Composing out

See Prolongation.

Compound melody

See Unfolding.

Coupling (German: Koppelung)

"The connection of two registers which lie an octave apart". It often results from a register transfer in which the transferred voice maintains a relation with its original register.

Cover tone (German: Deckton)

"A tone of the inner voice which appears above the foreground diminution". It often results from an ascending register transfer or coupling, but "the main thread of melodic activity remains with the displaced voice while the voice that does the displacing functions as a 'cover'".

== D ==
Deckton

See Cover tone.

Diminution

"The process by which an interval formed by notes of longer value is expressed in notes of smaller value".

Divider (German: Teiler)

Consonant subdivision of a consonant interval: the octave can be divided at the fifth (fifth-divider, German: Quintteiler) and the fifth can be divided at the third (third-teiler, German: Terzteiler). Schenker had also imagined a divider at the fourth (or lower fifth), but he apparently abandoned the concept after 1926, probably because the upper fourth does not belong to the divided triad. See also Schenkerian analysis: The arpeggiation of the bass and the divider at the fifth.

== E ==
Elaboration

See Prolongation

== F ==
Fernhören

See Structural hearing.

First-order arpeggiation

Arpeggiated motion leading to the primary tone of the fundamental line. The term has been proposed by Forte & Gilbert. See also Schenkerian analysis: Initial ascent, initial arpeggiation.

Foreground (German: Vordergrund)

See Structural level.

Free Composition (German: freier Satz)

Title of the American translation of Schenker's Der freie Satz

Fundamental line (German: Urlinie)

The melodic aspect of the fundamental structure, a stepwise descent from one of the triad notes to the tonic, with the bass arpeggiation being the harmonic aspect. The notion of the descending fundamental line belongs to the final version of Schenkerian theory, from 1930 onwards; fundamental (or, better, "primal") lines in Schenker's earlier writings at times were ascending. The first note of the fundamental line is its primary tone. See also Schenkerian analysis: The fundamental line.

Fundamental structure (German: Ursatz)

"The background in music is represented by a contrapuntal structure which I have designated the fundamental structure". It consists in the fundamental line counterpointed by the bass arpeggiation, together forming a counterpoint of the outer lines (German: Außensatz).

== H ==
Headnote

See Primary tone.

Hintergrund

See Background.

Höherlegung

See Register transfer

== I ==
Initial arpeggiation

See First-order arpeggiation.

Initial ascent (German: Anstieg)

Ascending motion leading to the primary tone of the fundamental line.

== K ==
Klang

The complex sound consisting of the first five notes of the harmonic series, suggesting a model for the major triad.

Kopfton

See Primary note.

Koppelung

See Coupling.

== L ==
Level

See Structural level.

Linear progression (German: Auskomponierungszug or Zug)

A passing note elaboration involving stepwise melodic motion in one direction between two harmonic tones.

== M ==
Middleground (German: Mittelgrund)

See Structural level

Mischung

See Mixture.

Mittelgrund

See Middelground.

Mixture (German: Mischung)

Change of mode of the tonic (major to minor, minor to major).

== N ==
Neighbour note (German: Nebennote)

Nonchord tone that passes, usually stepwise, from a chord tone directly above or below it (which frequently causes the NN to create dissonance with the chord) and resolves to the same chord tone. See Neighbor tone. See also Schenkerian analysis.

== O ==
Octave transfer

See Register transfer.

Obligate Lage

See Obligatory register.

Obligatory register (German: obligate Lage)

"No matter how far the composing-out may depart from its basic register [...], it nevertheless retains an urge to return to that register". This urge is often fulfilled, but not always.

== P ==
Primal line, Primal structure

The use of "Fundamental" as a translation of Ur- in Urlinie or Ursatz has been questioned. For more details, see Fundamental structure: Terminology.

Primary tone (German: Kopfton)

The first tone of the Fundamental line. One of the three notes of the tonic triad,, or. See Schenkerian analysis:The fundamental line.

Prolongation (German: Auskomponierung), Composing-out, Elaboration

The process in tonal music through which a pitch, interval, or consonant triad is able to govern spans of music when not physically sounding. Schenker himself appears to have used the German term Prolongation mainly to describe extensions of the laws of strict counterpoint to freer writing: see Prolongation in Heinrich Schenker. Auskomponierung can be literally translated as "composing-out"; the German word is coined on the model of Ausarbeitung, "elaboration".

== R ==
Reaching over (German: Übergreifen)

Elaboration by which a descending inner voice is placed above the (descending) upper voice by a register transfer. Successive reaching-over lines may produce an ascending motion. See List of Schenker's references to reaching over.

Register transfer

Ascending (German: Höherlegung) or descending (German: Tieferlegung) motion of one or several voices into a different octave (i.e. into a different register).

== S ==
Scale-step (German: Stufe)

"The scale-step is a higher and more abstract unit [than that of triad]. At times it may even comprise several harmonies [...]; in other words: even if, under certain circumstances, a certain number of harmonies look like independent triads or seventh-chords, they may nonetheless add up, in their totality, to one single triad [...] and they would have to be subsumed under the concept of this triad [...] as a scale-step.

Schicht

See Structural level.

Stimmtausch

See Voice exchange.

Strata (German: Schichten)

Term used by John Rothgeb to translate Schicht (see Structural level) in Oswald Jonas' Introduction to the Theory of Heinrich Schenker.

Structural hearing

Title of the influential book by Felix Salzer. The expression may derive from that of "long-distance hearing" (German: Fernhören), that Schenker used in Der Tonwille 1 and 2 (1921 and 1922) and that Furtwängler quoted in his paper "Heinrich Schenker. Ein zeitgemäßes Problem" of 1947.

Structural level (German: Schicht)

Schenker uses the term "level" mainly in the expression "voice-leading level", denoting the successive levels through which the fundamental structure develops to form the foreground. The expression "Structural level" appears to have been coined by Allen Forte.

Stufe

See Scale step.

== T ==
Teiler

See Divider.

Tieferlegung

See Register transfer.

Tonal space

One of the most general principles of Schenkerian analysis: the intervals between the notes of the tonic triad form a tonal space that is filled with passing and neighbour notes, producing new triads and new tonal spaces, open for further elaborations until the surface of the work (the score) is reached.

== U ==
Übergreifen

See Reaching over.

Unfolding (German: Ausfaltung)

The transformation of a single chord into a horizontal succession (see Arpeggiation), either when a tone of the upper voice and one of the inner voice are interconnected, or when a similar connection takes place in a succession of several chords. See Coupling. See also Schenkerian analysis: Unfolding.

Urlinie

See Fundamental line.

Urlinietafel

"Graph of the Urlinie", rhythmic reduction or the score with which Schenker often began his analyses. See also Schenkerian analysis: Schenkerian notation.

Ursatz

See Fundamental structure.

== V ==
Voice exchange (German: Stimmtausch)

"A pattern that involves two and only two voices, a pattern in which the voices literally exchange their pitches." See also Schenkerian analysis: Voice exchange.

Voice leading

"The study of voice leading is the study of the principles that govern the progression of the component voices of a composition both separately and in combination. In the Schenkerian tradition, this study begins with strict species counterpoint."

Vordergrund

See Foreground.

== Z ==
Zug

See Linear progression.

== See also ==
- Glossary of jazz and popular music
- Glossary of musical terminology
