= Zug (disambiguation) =

Zug is a city in Switzerland.

Zug or ZUG may also refer to:

== People ==
- Zug (surname), a surname

== Places ==
- Canton of Zug, Switzerland
- Lake Zug (German: Zugersee), a lake in Central Switzerland, situated between Lucerne and Zurich
- Zug, Iran, a village in South Khorasan Province
- Zug Island, in Detroit
- Zug, Western Sahara

== Other uses ==
- EV Zug, ice hockey team
- Linear progression
- Zug, the German equivalent of a platoon
- Z User Group
- Zug, an evil Sark from the TV show Hot Wheels Battle Force 5
- Zug (Tugs), a fictional character from the 1989 UK children's television series
- Zug 94, football team
- Zug (website), or ZUG, a comedy website that was founded in 1995 by Sir John Hargrave and Genevieve Martineau
- Zug massacre, 2001 mass shooting in Zug, Switzerland
- Zug Izland
