= Dreiklang =

Dreiklang may refer to:

- Triad (music), a three note chord
- Klang (music), a concept in Riemannian and Schenkerian theories
- Der Dreiklang, Schenkerian journal
- Triad (film), a 1938 German film
