= ZUG =

ZUG may refer to:

- Zug.com, a comedy website run by John Hargrave.
- the acronym for the Z User Group.
- A computer language: "ZOPL utility generator" later renamed RTM.

See also Zug (disambiguation)
