= Prolongation =

Process in tonal music

In music theory, prolongation is the process in tonal music through which a pitch, interval, or consonant triad is considered to govern spans of music when not physically sounding. It is a central principle in the music-analytic methodology of Schenkerian analysis, conceived by Austrian theorist Heinrich Schenker. The English term usually translates Schenker's Auskomponierung (better translated as "composing out" or "elaboration"). According to Fred Lerdahl, "The term 'prolongation' [...] usually means 'composing out' (Schenker's own intention for the term is open to debate)."

Prolongation can be thought of as a way of generating musical content through the linear elaboration of simple and basic tonal structures with progressively increasing detail and sophistication, and thus analysis consists of a reduction from detail to structure. Important to the operation of prolongation is the hierarchical differentiation of pitches within a passage of tonal music. Typically, the note or harmony of highest hierarchical significance is the tonic, and this is said to be "prolonged" across durations of music that may feature many other different harmonies. (However, in principle any other type of consonant chord, pitch, or harmonic function can be prolonged within tonal music.) "In chord prolongation, one chord governs a prolongation of various chords; these different chords are subordinated to that one chord which they help to express and prolong."

A pitch is located in a pitch class, a pitch class is located within a chord, a chord is located in a key region, a key is located in pitch space including the circle of fifths and their relative minors. A rhythmic event is located within the meter which is located within the form. Thus "reductions" are often made at different levels excluding the prolongational from the structural events; these may express the relationships through time-reductions or prologational reductions (which may be Urlinien or tree diagrams).

== Prolongation in Schenkerian theory ==
The early 20th-century music theorist Heinrich Schenker (1868–1935) was responsible for developing both the conceptual framework for prolongation and a means of analyzing music in terms of prolonged musical structures (called Schenkerian analysis).

Schenker’s own usage of the term differs from the modern one. The German word Prolongation is not common, and Schenker first used it in a very specific meaning (maybe originating in legal, possibly Viennese vocabulary), referring to the extension of the primal laws (Urgesetze) or of the primal concepts (Urbegriffe) of strict composition in free composition and the phenomena resulting from the extension of these laws. He used the word mainly to denote the transformation of a given level of voice-leading to the next one, describing the passage from level to level as a Prolongation. Adele T. Katz appears to be responsible for the shift of meaning where "prolongation" became the American translation of Auskomponierung.

In his analysis of J.S. Bach's Little Prelude in D minor, BWV 926, in Der Tonwille 5, Schenker proposes what may be his earliest figure showing the steps through which the Ursatz develops into the foreground. He explains that this figure "shows the gradual growth of the voice-leading prolongations, all predetermined in the womb of the Urlinie". The "gradual growth" illustrated is a global phenomenon, always concerning the piece as a whole. The figure is further commented upon on p. 45 of the same volume. Schenker stresses that it starts with the two-voice setting of the Ursatz – an expression, therefore, of the fundamental laws of strict counterpoint. Each of the following steps is described as a Prolongation, a specific freedom taken with respect to the laws expressed in the previous step. And in Freie Satz, he confirms that the word still refers to the passing from one voice-leading level to another: "For the sake of continuity with my earlier theoretical and analytical works, I am retaining in this volume the words of Latin derivation Prolongation and Diminution as designations for the voice-leading levels in the middleground".

The concept of Prolongation is important for Schenker because he believes that showing how a masterpiece of free composition remains rooted in the laws of strict counterpoint explains its utter unity, its "synthesis". The means and techniques of passing from one level to the next are subsumed in Schenker's notion of "composing out" or "compositional elaboration" (Auskomponierung, a German neologism), which for him is a mechanism of elaborating pitch materials in musical time. The means of elaboration are described below as "prolongational techniques", in conformity with the modern Schenkerian English usage, but should better be termed "elaborations".

The broadening of the meaning of "prolongation" has been described by Anthony Pople in seven steps: (1) Schenker proposes it as an operational concept in his teaching; (2) Felix Salzer, Allen Forte and others, disseminate and clarify it; (3) it is used within attempted formalisations of Schenkerian analysis; (4) new theories evoking Schenker make use of it; (5) it is used within theories amplifying Schenker's own; (6) definitions are proposed in theories beyond the Schenkerian canon; and (7) definitions of the term are proposed in relation to atonal music. The replacement of Schenker's own term Auskomponierung by "prolongation" appeared in step (2), as an English translation.

The English "prolongation" has been used in The Masterwork in Music to translate German words including Auskomponierung, ausdrücken and Auswicklung. In Free Composition, "prolongation" is more than once used to translate Auskomponierung and "prolonged" for auskomponiert. Oster otherwise translates Auskomponierung as "composing out" and others use "compositional elaboration" or, short, "elaboration." Drabkin quotes as "methods of prolongation" techniques that include Anstieg, Ausfaltung, Koppelung, Tieferlegung, Übergreifen and Untergreifen, which Schenker would rather have described as techniques of Auskomponierung.

== Prolongational techniques ==
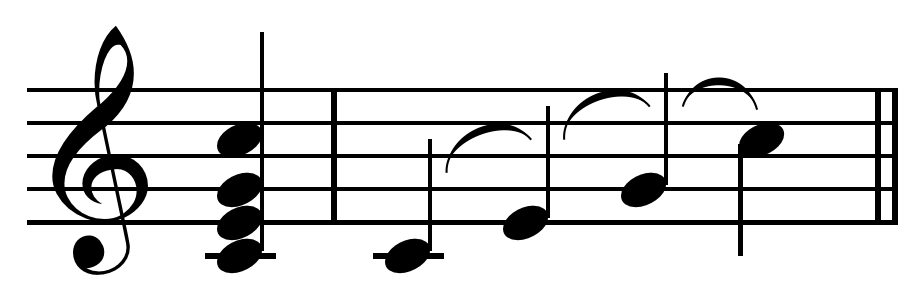
Arpeggiation, the first technique of composing-out.

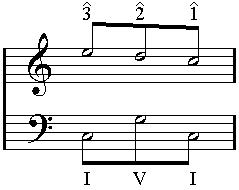
Urlinie: –– over I–V–I. Linear progressions prolong harmonies through elaboration.

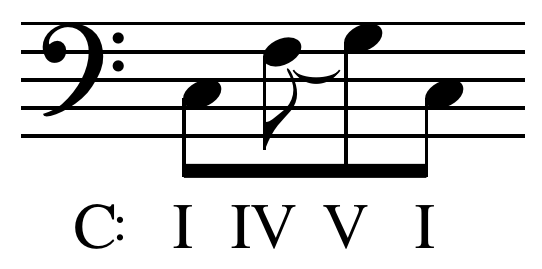
Bass prolongation: I–IV–V–I as elaboration of I–V–I.

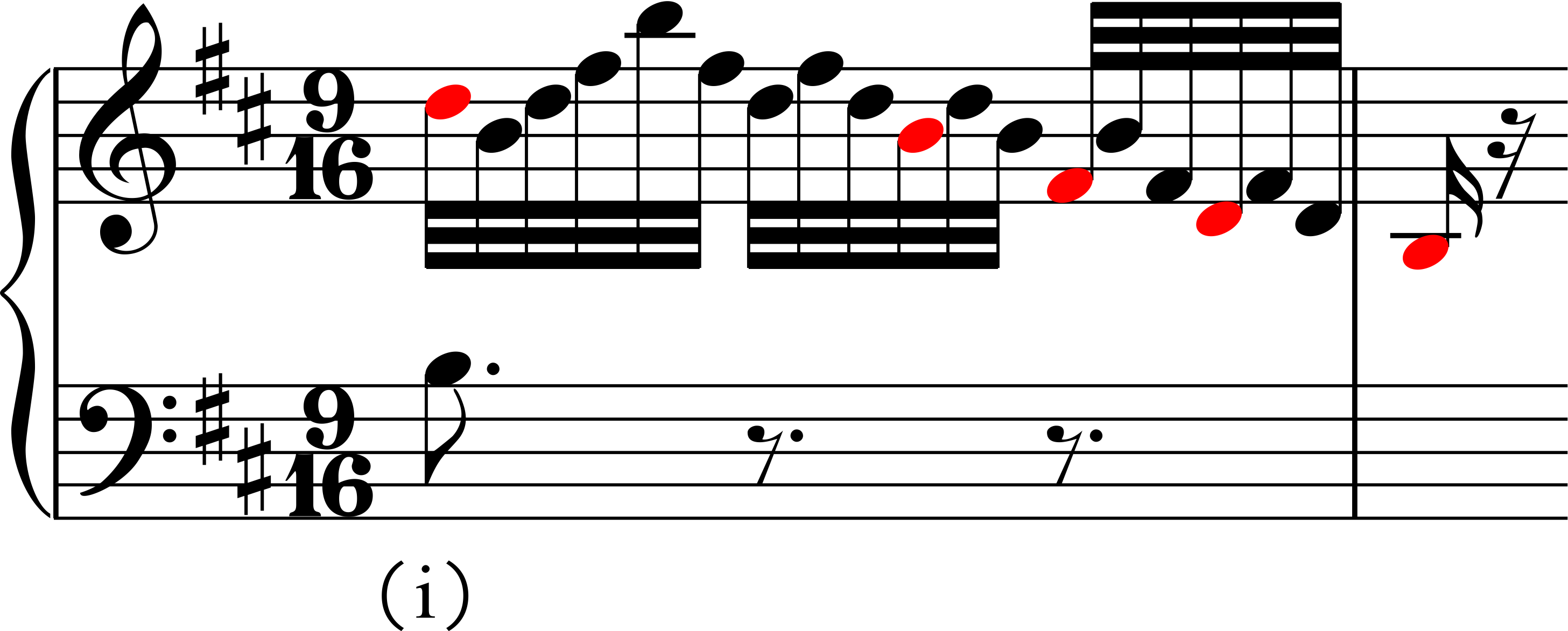
Fleshing out the structural tonic arpeggio as prolongation of that chord in Bach's Sinfonia 15, BWV 801, mm. 3-4

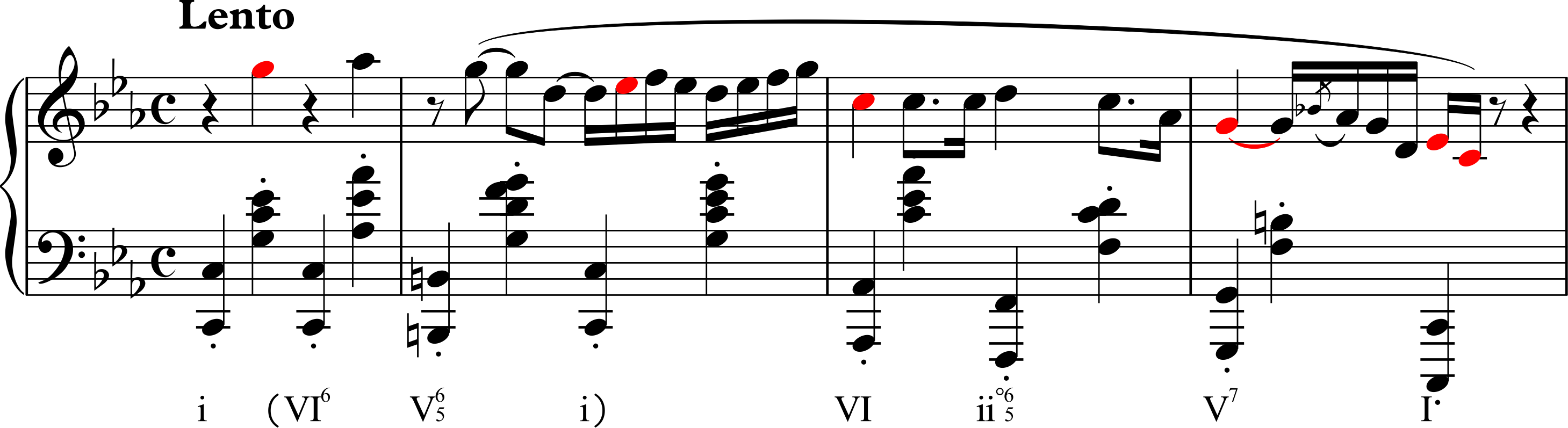
...and on a larger scale in Chopin's Nocturne in C minor, Op. 48-1, mm. 1-4

In Schenkerian analysis, the analyst discerns ways in which prolongation creates the details of a musical composition by elaborating the background structure. Most of these methods involve contrapuntal processes, to such a degree that Schenkerian theory is a theory that almost completely synthesizes harmony and linear counterpoint in the service of the more global phenomenon of tonal prolongation. Prolongational techniques include arpeggiations, linear progressions, unfoldings, etc., in general aiming at the horizontalization, "the elaboration in time of a governing vertical sonority – a chord or an interval. [...] When an interval is horizontalized, its tones unfold against a background determined in the vertical dimension by the governing sonority of which it is part."

== Conditions for prolongation ==
Developments in more recent music theory have sought to clarify the conditions under which prolongation may obtain, so that other repertoires may either be opened up or more justifiably be precluded. Schenker pupil Felix Salzer, for example, detects the rudiments of prolongational horizontalization in music as early as 12th-century plainchant and argues that it is a musical principle that persists through post-tonal music as well, such as Paul Hindemith and Igor Stravinsky. Music theorist Robert Morgan has argued that a central tenet of Schenkerian thought—that only consonant triads are capable of prolongation—needlessly excludes a class of dissonant sonorities, such as diminished sevenths or a more arbitrarily defined set of pitches; Morgan claims that, starting in the 19th century, composers such as Liszt, Wagner, and Scriabin, began "composing out" these dissonant configurations as rigorous a manner as is usually ascribed to the triadic prolongation of tonal composers.

Music theorist Joseph Straus has attempted to define why atonal music precludes prolongational hearing. His own definition of prolongation is "the sense of continuation of a musical object, particularly when not literally present ... prolongation is a cognitive act of the listener". He formulated four conditions for the possibility of Schenkerian prolongation in any musical style (1987) These are:

1. Consistent distinction between consonance and dissonance.
2. A scale of stability among consonant harmonies [see diatonic function].
3. Ways in which less structural pitches embellish more structural pitches.
4. A clear relationship between harmony and voice-leading.

Straus concludes that such conditions do not exist in atonal music and therefore that "atonal prolongation" is impossible; although he is open to the possibility that prolongation is a possibility in other post-tonal music (he gives the example of music composed with the octatonic scale), he argues that in practice most post-tonal music does not display this. Instead, he suggests that in post-tonal music, including atonal music, a model of 'association' is more defensible than strict prolongation. However, Lerdahl argues that Straus' argument is based on circular criteria. Lerdahl's own formulation of prolongation is more amenable to atonal structures. For example, in atonal music, strong prolongation may be distinguished from progression, repetition of an event versus movement to a different event, while weak prolongation, repetition of an event in altered form, may not easily be distinguished due to the lack of a referential triad (klang). Miguel Roig-Francolí has proposed a related theory of 'Pitch-Class-Set Extension', in which contiguous harmonic units are linked through common-tone or chromatic connection and successive harmonies are understood to 'extend' earlier ones.
