= Bariolage =

Musical technique for bowed string instruments

Bariolage is a musical technique used with bowed string instruments that involves rapidly playing alternated notes on adjacent strings, one of which is generally left open, thereby exploiting the different timbres of each string. Bariolage may involve quick alternation between a static note and changing notes that form a melody either above or below the static note. The static note is usually an open string note, which creates a highly resonant sound. In bluegrass fiddling the technique is known as "cross-fingering".

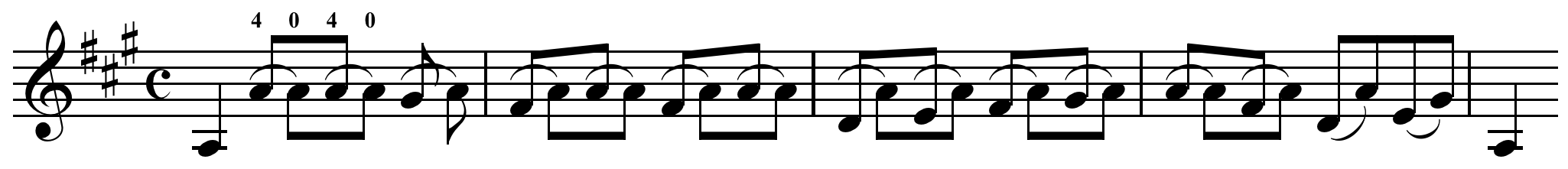
Example of bariolage from Principes du Violon (1761), p.79, by L'Abbé le Fils

The term bariolage appears to have been coined in the nineteenth century to denote an eighteenth-century violin technique requiring flexibility in the wrist and forearm, the mechanics of which are not discussed by nineteenth-century writers. Etymologically, in French, the term was taken from the noun bariolage meaning a 'disorderly mix of bright colors', which in turn derives from the verb barioler meaning 'to cover with a mix of bright colors'. The bowing technique most often used for bariolage is called ondulé in French or ondeggiando In Italian. Bariolage may also be executed with separate bow strokes.

The French violinist-composer Pierre Baillot writes in his pedagogical treatise of 1834, L'Art du violon (perhaps looking back on what he considered an earlier, less advanced era),

The name bariolage is given to the kind of passage which presents the appearance of disorder and oddness, in that the notes are not played in succession on the same string where one would expect this or when the notes e^{2}, a^{1}, d^{1}, are played not on the same string but alternately with one stopped finger and the open string, or else finally when the open string is played in a position where a stopped note would normally be required.

Joseph Haydn used this effect in the minuet of his Symphony No. 28, in the finale of the "Farewell" Symphony, No. 45, and throughout the finale of his String Quartet Op. 50, No. 6. The "croaking" or "gurgling" unison bariolage passages on D and A gives this quartet its nickname of The Frog.

In the following example, from a violin sonata by Handel, (Note: The Schirmer edition identifies the sonata, in F major, as "12th of the 15 Sonate ad Camera". The quotation comes from the second movement.) the second measure is to be played with bariolage:

In this passage, the repeated A is played on the open A string, alternating with Fs and Es fingered on the adjacent D string. The notes on the D string (E and F natural) would be fingered as normal (first finger and low second), but the fingerings given above the second measure would be [2040 1040 2040 1040], indicating the switch (bariolage) from open A string to the stopped fourth finger on the D string, also playing the note A.

Another well-known example of bariolage is in Bach's Preludio to the E major Partita No. 3 for solo violin, where three strings are involved in the maneuver (one open string and two fingered notes).

Bariolage is much more rarely employed during the Romantic period in the nineteenth century, but some notable examples of its use are found in Brahms's works. Brahms used this device in the String Sextet in G Major (where it occurs at the very beginning in the viola) and in the Third Violin Sonata, Op. 108.

== Twentieth-century extensions ==
Although bariolage has been an established violinistic technique since at least the early eighteenth century, in contemporary music it may be regarded as an extended technique when used simultaneously in different instruments, or in conjunction with complex rhythmic layering or microtonal tunings. Examples may be found in Mauricio Kagel's 1993 string quartet Notturno and the cadenza of Giacinto Scelsi's 1965 Anahit.

In the twentieth century, composers have adapted the bariolage idea to other instruments, particularly the trombone, where a constant pitch may be repeated while rapidly changing between different slide positions—a technique some composers call enharmonic change or enharmonic tremolo. Notable trombone pieces using this device are Luciano Berio's Sequenza V for solo trombone, and Vinko Globokar's Eppure si muove for a conducting solo trombonist and eleven musicians.

Elliott Carter adapted the technique to the harp in a solo work actually titled Bariolage (1992), which blends the device with trills and a harp technique called bisbigliando, "in a profusion of trilling passages and enharmonic unison colourings."

== See also ==
- Melodic fission
- Unfolding (music)
