= Fundamental structure =

Underlying structure of a tonal musical work in Schenkerian analysis

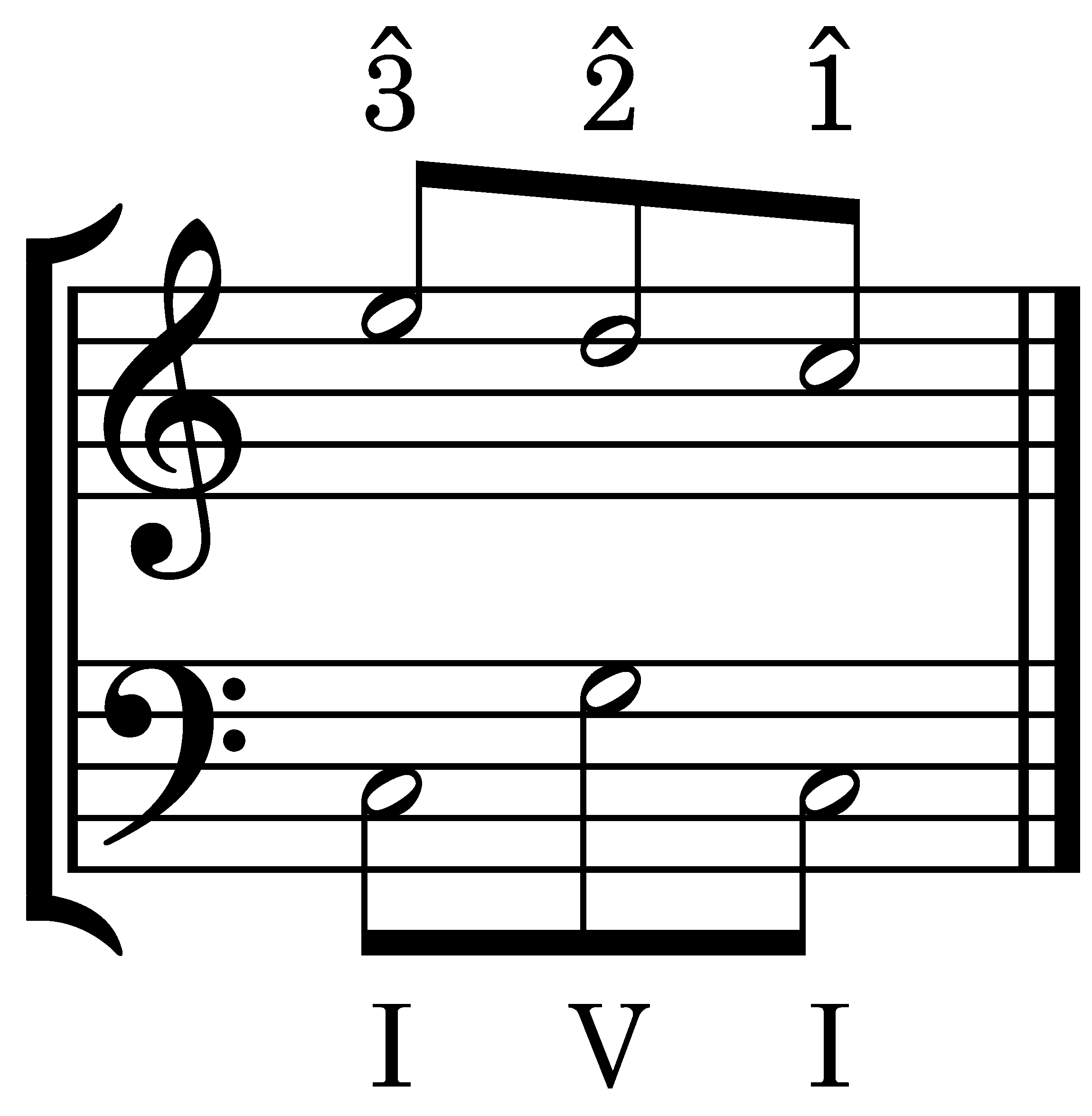
The minimal Ursatz: a line supported by an arpeggiation of the bass..

In Schenkerian analysis, the fundamental structure (German: Ursatz) describes the structure of a tonal work as it occurs at the most remote (or "background") level and in the most abstract form. A basic elaboration of the tonic triad, it consists of the fundamental line accompanied by the bass arpeggiation. Hence the fundamental structure, like the fundamental line itself, takes one of three forms, depending on which tonic triad pitch is the primary tone. The example hereby shows a fundamental structure in C major, with the fundamental line descending from scale degree:

The Urlinie offers the unfurling (Auswicklung) of a basic triad, it presents tonality on horizontal paths. The tonal system, too, flows into these as well, a system intended to bring purposeful order into the world of chords through its selection of the harmonic degrees. The mediator between the horizontal formulation of tonality presented by the Urlinie and the vertical formulation presented by the harmonic degrees is voice leading.

The upper voice of a fundamental structure, which is the fundamental line, utilizes the descending direction; the lower voice, which is the bass arpeggiation through the fifth, takes the ascending direction (fig. 1). [...] The combination of fundamental line and bass arpeggiation constitutes a unity. [...] Neither the fundamental line nor the bass arpeggiation can stand alone. Only when acting together, when unified in a contrapuntal structure, do they produce art.

== Fundamental line ==
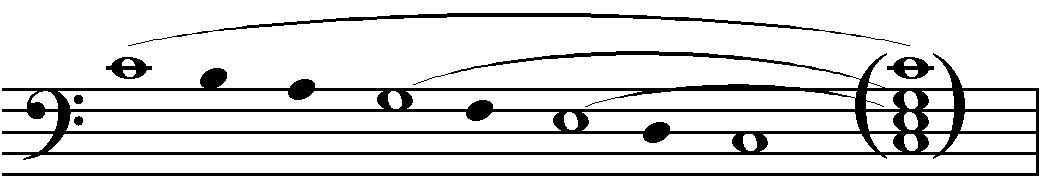
Urlinie in relation to the tonic triad.

The fundamental line (German: Urlinie) is the melodic aspect of the Fundamental structure (Ursatz), "a stepwise descent from one of the triad notes to the tonic" with the bass arpeggiation being the harmonic aspect. The fundamental line fills in the spaces created by the descending arpeggiation of the tonic triad. Its first tone (primary tone, head tone) may be, or.

There are no tonal spaces other than those of —, —, and —. There is no other origin for passing-tone progressions, or of melody.

Lines from are rare; some Schenkerians consider them impossible. There appears to exist a tendency, in modern Schenkerian analyses, to prefer lines from.

== Bass arpeggiation and the upper-fifth divider ==
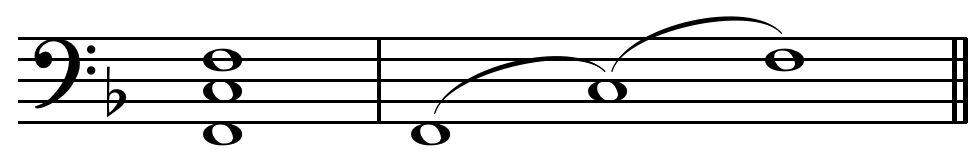
Upper-fifth divider.

The upper [...] fifth of a chord, presenting itself by leap in the service of a passing motion or neighbor note, I call an upper-fifth divider

In the case of the Ursatz, the upper-fifth divider is in the service of in the Urlinie. Together, they may form the germ of a dominant chord at a later level. See Schenkerian analysis.

== Terminology ==
The term Ursatz is not common in German, but it was not created by Schenker. Its meaning is close to that of "axiom"; it is used among others by Schopenhauer. The translation of Ursatz as "fundamental structure" and of Urlinie as "fundamental line" has been questioned. The translators of Das Meisterwerk in der Musik and Der Tonwille and those of the project Schenker Documents Online have chosen to retain the German original terms in their translations.

Adele T. Katz, one of the first commentators of Schenker in the United States, may be responsible for the choice of "structure" as a translation for Satz. She defined in 1935 the Ursatz as "the elemental structure out of which the composition evolves." In 1945, she opposed the "harmonic and structural chords" to the "contrapuntal and prolonging chords" and she translated Urlinie as "the structural top voice". These expressions were taken over by Felix Salzer, who apparently was the first to speak of "fundamental structure".

While "structure" may seem acceptable as a translation of Satz in this context, by want of anything better, that of Ur- as "fundamental" is much less. As Stephen Peles puts it,

We lost something when we adopted "fundamental line" as the standard translation of Urlinie; "primal line" captures more of the resonance the word would have had for Schenker's readers, who would immediately have made the association with Ursprache, and other Ur-thises and Ur-thats that were the ultimate philological goals of their respective historical disciplines.

In other disciplines, Ur- usually is translated as "primal", as in Goethe's Urpflanze, the "primal plant", or in Urdenken ("primal thinking"), Urbild, "primal image" (Goethe) or Urform, "primal form", "archetype" (Schelling), etc.

== See also ==
- Linear progression
- Schenkerian analysis
