= Computer Stew =

Internet video series

Computer Stew was an Internet video series about technology created by John Hargrave, founder of Zug.com, and Jay Stevens. Most of the characters in the show are ZDNet employees. The series premiered on ZDNet in fall 1999, and lasted for five seasons until spring 2001. The staff of Computer Stew used inexpensive off-the-shelf video tools and hardware to create the show, including a web cam, a computer, and Adobe Premiere software.

== Computer Stew Staff ==
- John Hargrave, host
- Jay Stevens, co-host, usually featured talking through a speakerphone
- Henry Harvey, head writer and creative consultant
- Al Natanagara, producer and artist
- Moses Blumenstiel, producer
- Marty Barrett, writer
- Mike Ward, head programmer
- Tim Elkins, assistant programmer
- Jim Morash, intern
