= Structural level =

Structural level of a piece of music

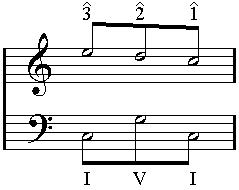
Fundamental structure.

In Schenkerian analysis, a structural level is a representation of a piece of music at a different level of abstraction, with levels typically including foreground, middleground, and background. According to Schenker musical form is "an energy transformation, as a transformation of the forces that flow from background to foreground through the levels."

For example, while details such as melodic notes exist at the lowest structural levels, the foreground, in the background the fundamental structure is the most basic structural level of all tonal music, representing the digression from and necessary return to the tonic that motivates musical form. It may be conceived of in a specific piece as the opening in the tonic and the return to the tonic with a perfect authentic cadence (V-I) after the development of sonata allegro form.

Strata is the translation given by John Rothgeb for Schichten ("Levels") as described by Oswald Jonas in his Introduction to the Theory of Heinrich Schenker. This translation did not gain wide acceptance in modern Schenkerian literature and the translation of Schichten as "levels" usually has been preferred.

"Structural level" may not exactly correspond to Schenker's own concept. Schenker thought that the levels were levels of elaboration of the piece of music, so that the first level was not the background itself (the starting point), but its first elaboration at the early middleground. He called levels "the voice-leading and transformation levels, prolongations, elaborations, and similar means."

The image hereby shows Schenker's earliest presentation of levels in a figure, his analysis of J.S. Bach's Little Prelude in D minor, BWV 926, in Der Tonwille 5 (1923), p. 8. Schenker writes:

"The figure hereafter shows the gradual growth of the voice-leading prolongations, all predetermined in the womb of the Urlinie.

a) gives the image of the Urlinie progression and the first intervals;
b) introduces the downward register transfer f^{2}—f^{1} by means of third progressions in the outer voices and the 5—6 exchange, then the renewed swing upwards to f^{2};
c) shows the chromaticisms, effecting more powerful (tonicizing) connections and thereby articulating the octave progression in three third progressions: f^{2}–d^{2}, d^{2}–b^{1}, a^{1}–f^{1};
d) and e) show how, in the second chord of the octave series, the third c^{2} is not led up chromatically to c♯^{2}, but is reached through a falling third progression from e^{2}. It is the voice-leading that we also encountered in Prelude No. 3 (see Figure 1; Tonwille 1, p. 3), only here the contrapuntal octave progression of the lower voice is placed not on the divider at the upper fifth, as it was there, but on that at the lower fifth. Voice-leading errors threaten on the way to this divider: consecutive (contrary) fifths at d), open fifths at e);

f) finally shows the removal of the consecutive fifths by means of the exchange 6–5, which is also welcome to the diminution."

The expression "structural level" (completing Schicht, "level," by "structural") may have been created by Felix Salzer in Structural Hearing. Salzer apparently never uses "level" alone to mean Schicht.

== See also ==
- Klang (music)
- Prolongation, also Prolongation in Schenkerian theory.
- Urlinie
