= Zuk, Iran =

Zuk زوك
- Village
- Location within Iran
- Coordinates: 33°41′42″N 58°59′56″E
- Country: Iran
- Province: South Khorasan
- County: Qaen
- Bakhsh: Central
- Rural District: Qaen

Population (2006)
  - Total: 15
- Time zone: UTC+3:30 (IRST)
  - Summer (DST): UTC+4:30 (IRDT)

Zuk (Persian: زوك, also Romanized as Zūk, Zaug, Zowk, and Zūg) is a village in Qaen Rural District, in the Central District of Qaen County, South Khorasan Province, Iran. At the 2006 census, its population was 15, in 6 families.
