= Schenkerian analysis =

Method of analyzing tonal music

Schenkerian analysis is a method of analyzing tonal music based on the theories of Heinrich Schenker (1868–1935). The goal is to demonstrate the organic coherence of the work by showing how the "foreground" (all notes in the score) relates to an abstracted deep structure, the Ursatz. This primal structure is roughly the same for any tonal work, but a Schenkerian analysis shows how, in each individual case, that structure develops into a unique work at the foreground. A key theoretical concept is "tonal space". The intervals between the notes of the tonic triad in the background form a tonal space that is filled with passing and neighbour tones, producing new triads and new tonal spaces that are open for further elaborations until the "surface" of the work (the score) is reached.

The analysis uses a specialized symbolic form of musical notation. Although Schenker himself usually presents his analyses in the generative direction, starting from the Ursatz to reach the score and showing how the work is somehow generated from the Ursatz, the practice of Schenkerian analysis more often is reductive, starting from the score and showing how it can be reduced to its fundamental structure. The graph of the Ursatz is arrhythmic, as is a strict-counterpoint cantus firmus exercise. Even at intermediate levels of reduction, rhythmic signs (open and closed noteheads, beams and flags) display not rhythm but the hierarchical relationships between the pitch-events.

Schenkerian analysis is an abstract, complex, and difficult method, not always clearly expressed by Schenker himself and not always clearly understood. It mainly aims to reveal the internal coherence of the work – a coherence that ultimately resides in its being tonal. In some respects, a Schenkerian analysis can reflect the perceptions and intuitions of the analyst.

== Fundamentals ==
=== Goals ===
Schenker intended his theory as an exegesis of musical "genius" or the "masterwork", ideas that were closely tied to German nationalism and monarchism. The canon represented in his analytical work therefore is almost entirely made up of German music of the common practice period (especially that of Johann Sebastian Bach, Carl Philipp Emanuel Bach, Joseph Haydn, Wolfgang Amadeus Mozart, Ludwig van Beethoven, Franz Schubert, and Johannes Brahms), and he used his methods to oppose more modern styles of music such as that of Max Reger and Igor Stravinsky. This led him to seek the key to an understanding of music in the traditional disciplines of counterpoint and figured bass, which was central to the compositional training of these composers. Schenker's project was to show that free composition (freier Satz) was an elaboration, a "prolongation", of strict composition (strenger Satz), by which he meant species counterpoint, particularly two-voice counterpoint. He did this by developing a theory of hierarchically organized levels of elaboration (Auskomponierung), called prolongational levels, voice-leading levels (Stimmführungsschichten), or transformations (Verwandlungen), the idea being that each of the successive levels represents a new freedom taken with respect to the rules of strict composition.

Because the first principle of the elaboration is the filling in of the tonal space by passing notes, an essential goal of the analysis is to show linear connections between notes which, filling a single triad at a given level, remain closely related to each other but which, at subsequent levels, may become separated by many measures or many pages as new triads are embedded in the first one. The analyst is expected to develop a "distance hearing" (Fernhören), a "structural hearing".

=== Harmony ===
The tonic triad, that from which the work as a whole arises, takes its model in the harmonic series. However,

the mere duplication of nature cannot be the object of human endeavour. Therefore ... the overtone series ... is transformed into a succession, a horizontal arpeggiation, which has the added advantage of lying within the range of the human voice. Thus the harmonic series is condensed, abbreviated for the purposes of art".

Linking the (major) triad to the harmonic series, Schenker merely pays lip service to an idea common in the early 20th century. He confirms that the same derivation cannot be made for the minor triad:

Any attempt to derive even as much as the first foundation of this [minor] system, i.e., the minor triad itself, from Nature, i.e., from the overtone series, would be more than futile. [...] The explanation becomes much easier if artistic intention rather than Nature herself is credited with the origin of the minor mode".

The basic component of Schenkerian harmony is the Stufe (scale degree, scale-step), i.e. a chord having gained structural significance. Chords arise from within chords, as the result of the combination of passing notes and arpeggiations: they are at first mere embellishments, mere voice-leading constructions, but they become tonal spaces open for further elaboration and, once elaborated, can be considered structurally significant: they become scale-steps properly speaking. Schenker recognizes that "there are no rules which could be laid down once and for all" for recognizing scale-steps, but from his examples one may deduce that a triad cannot be recognized as a scale-step as long as it can be explained by passing or neighboring voice-leading.

Schenkerian analyses label scale-steps with Roman numerals, a practice common in 19th- and 20th-century Vienna, developed by the theoretic work of Georg Joseph Vogler and his student Gottfried Weber, transmitted by Simon Sechter and his disciple Anton Bruckner, the classes of whom Schenker had followed in the Konservatorium in Vienna.

Schenker's theory is monotonal: the Ursatz, as the diatonic unfolding of the tonic triad, by definition cannot include modulation. Local "tonicisation" may arise when a scale-step is elaborated to the point of becoming a local tonic, but the work as a whole projects a single key and ultimately a single Stufe (the tonic).

=== Counterpoint, voice-leading ===
Two-voice counterpoint remains for Schenker the model of strict writing. Free composition is a freer usage of the laws of strict counterpoint. One of the aims of the analysis is to trace how the work remains subject to these laws at the deepest level, despite the freedom taken at subsequent levels.

One aspect of strict, two-voice writing that appears to span Schenker's theory throughout the years of its elaboration is the rule of "fluent melody" (fließender Gesang), or "melodic fluency". Schenker attributes the rule to Luigi Cherubini, who would have written that "fluent melody is always preferable in strict counterpoint." Melodic fluency, the preference for conjunct (stepwise) motion, is one of the main rules of voice leading, even in free composition. It avoids successive leaps and produces "a kind of wave-like melodic line which as a whole represents an animated entity, and which, with its ascending and descending curves, appears balanced in all its individual component parts". This idea is at the origin of that of linear progression (Zug) and, more specifically, of that of the Fundamental Line (Urlinie).

=== Ursatz ===
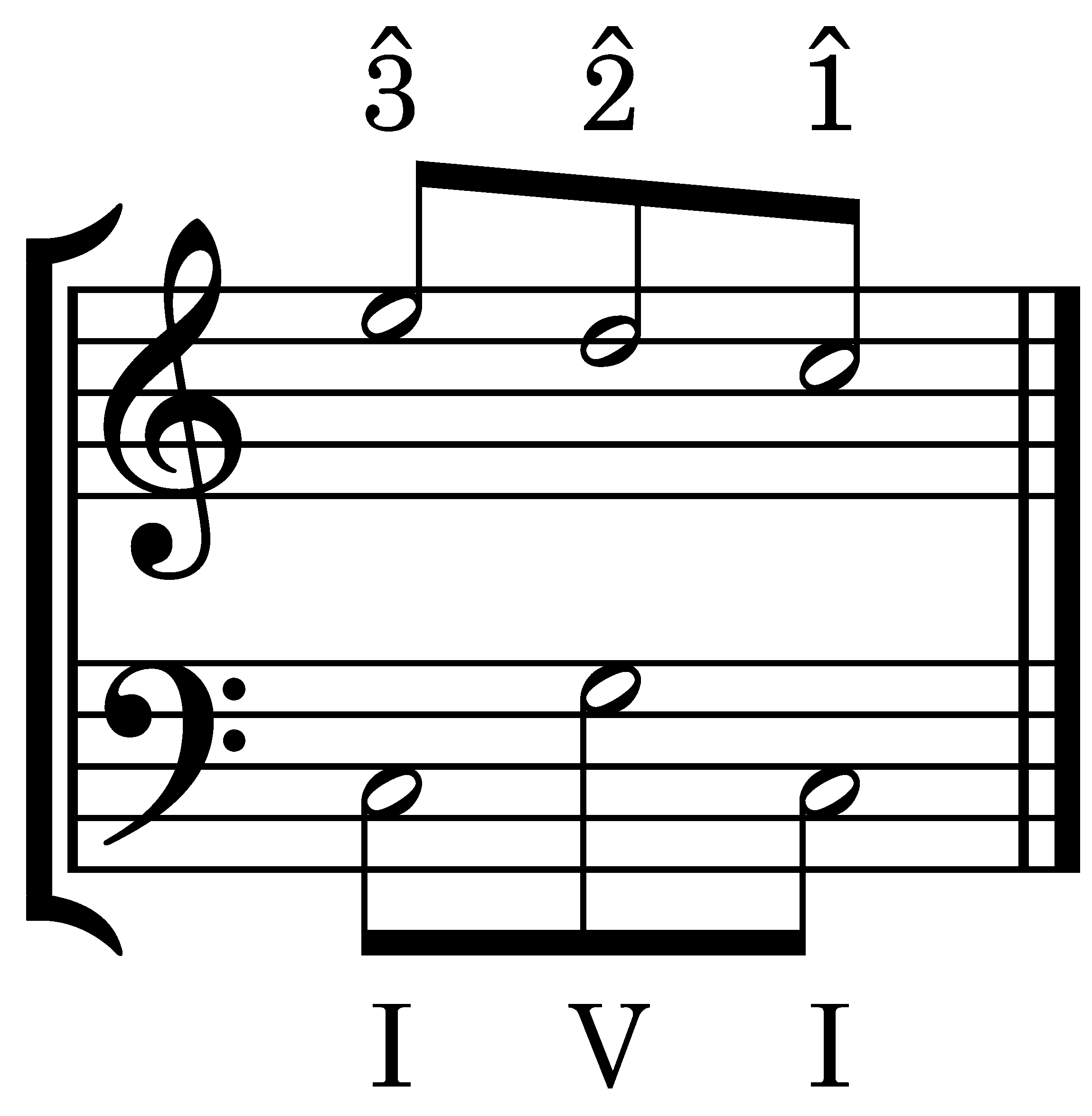
Minimal Ursatz: a line supported by an arpeggiation of the bass

The Ursatz (usually translated as the "fundamental structure") is the name given by Schenker to the underlying structure in its simplest form, that from which the work as a whole originates. In the canonical form of the theory, it consists of the Urlinie, the "fundamental line", supported by the Bassbrechung, the "arpeggiation of the bass". The fundamental structure is a two-voice counterpoint and as such belongs to strict composition. In conformity with the theory of the tonal space, the fundamental line is a line starting from any note of the triad and descending to the tonic itself. The arpeggiation is an arpeggiation through the fifth, ascending from I to V and descending back to I. The Urlinie unfolds the tonal space in a melodic dimension, while the Bassbrechung expresses its harmonic dimension.

The theory of the fundamental structure is the most criticized aspect of Schenkerian theory: it has seemed unacceptable to reduce all tonal works to one of a few almost identical background structures. This is a misunderstanding: Schenkerian analysis is not about demonstrating that all compositions can be reduced to the same background, but about showing how each work elaborates the background in a unique, individual manner, determining both its identity and its "meaning". Schenker has made this his motto: Semper idem, sed non eodem modo, "always the same, but never in the same manner".

==== Fundamental line ====
The idea of the fundamental line comes quite early in the development of Schenker's theory. Its first printed mention dates from 1920, in the edition of Beethoven's Sonata Op. 101, but the idea obviously links with that of "fluent melody", ten years earlier. Schenker first conceived the Urlinie, the "fundamental line", as a kind of motivic line characterized by its fluency, repeated under different guises throughout the work and ensuring its homogeneity. He later imagined that a musical work should have only one fundamental line, unifying it from beginning to end. The realization that such fundamental lines usually were descending led him to formulate the canonical definition of the fundamental line as necessarily descending. It is not that he rejected ascending lines, but that he came to consider them hierarchically less important. "The fundamental line begins with, or , and moves to via the descending leading tone ". The initial note of the fundamental line is called its "head tone" (Kopfton) or "primary tone". The head note may be elaborated by an upper neighbour note, but not a lower one. In many cases, the head note is reached through an ascending line (Anstieg, "initial ascent") or an ascending arpeggiation, which do not belong to the fundamental structure properly speaking.

==== Arpeggiation of the bass and the divider at the fifth ====
The arpeggiation through the fifth is an imitation of the overtone series, adapted to man [sic] "who within his own capacities can experience sound only in a succession". The fifth of the arpeggiation coincides with the last passing note of the fundamental line. This at first produces a mere "divider at the fifth", a complex filling in of the tonal space. However, as a consonant combination, it defines at a further level a new tonal space, that of the dominant chord, and so doing opens the path for further developments of the work. It would appear that the difference between the divider at the fifth and the dominant chord properly speaking really depends on the level at which the matter is considered: the notion of the divider at the fifth views it as an elaboration of the initial tonal space, while the notion of dominant chord conceives it as a new tonal space created within the first. But the opinions of modern Schenkerians diverge on this point.

== Schenkerian notation ==
Graphic representations form an important part of Schenkerian analyses: "the use of music notation to represent musical relationships is a unique feature of Schenker's work". Schenkerian graphs are based on a "hierarchic" notation, where the size of the notes, their rhythmic values and/or other devices indicate their structural importance. Schenker himself, in the foreword to his Five Graphic Analyses, claimed that "the presentation in graphic form has now been developed to a point that makes an explanatory text unnecessary". Even so, Schenkerian graphs represent a change of semiotic system, a shift from music itself to its graphical representation, akin to the more usual change from music to verbal (analytic) commentary; but this shift already exists in the score itself, and Schenker rightly noted the analogy between music notation and analysis. One aspect of graphic analyses that may not have been enough stressed is the desire to abolish time, to represent the musical work as something that could be apprehended at a glance or, at least, in a way that would replace a "linear" reading by a "tabular" one.

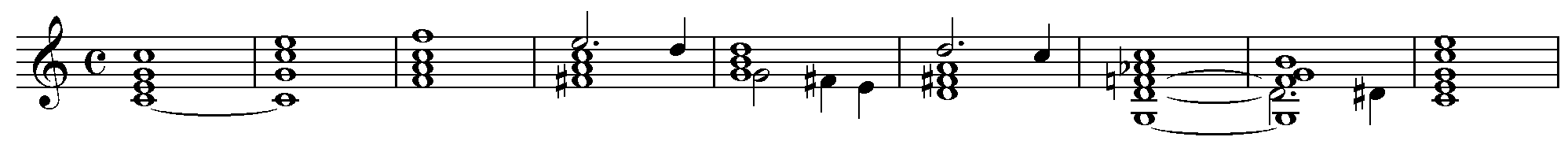
Rhythmic reduction of the first measures of Chopin's Etude, Op. 10, no. 1. Simplified version of the analysis of the "ground-harmony" in Czerny's School of Practical Composition, 1848 Original Reduction

The first step of the analytic rewriting often takes the form of a "rhythmic" reduction, that is one that preserves the score, but "normalizes" its rhythm and its voice-leading content. This type of reduction has a long tradition, not only in counterpoint treatises or theory books, but also in the simplified notation of some Baroque works, e.g. the Prelude to Händel's Suite in A major, HWV 426, or early versions of Bach's C major Prelude of Book I of the Well Tempered Keyboard. One indirect advantage of rhythmic reduction is that it helps reading the voice leading: Czerny's example hereby transforms Chopin's arpeggios into a composition in four (or five) voices. Edward Aldwell and Carl Schachter write that the first rewriting should "produce a setting that is reasonably close to note-against-note." Allen Cadwallader and David Gagné suggest a special type of rhythmic reduction that they call "imaginary continuo", stressing the link between the rhythmic reduction and a notation as a melody with figured bass. Basically, it consists in imagining a figured bass line for the work analyzed, and writing a chordal realization of it.

Schenker himself usually began his analyses with a rhythmic reduction that he termed Urlinietafel. From 1925 onwards he complemented these with other levels of representation, corresponding to the successive steps leading to the fundamental structure. At first, he mainly relied on the size of the note shapes to denote their hierarchic level, but later abandoned this system as it proved too complex for contemporary techniques of musical engraving. Allen Cadwallader and David Gagné propose a description of Schenker's system of graphic notation which, they say, "is flexible, enabling musicians to express in subtle (and sometimes different) ways what they hear and how they interpret a composition". They discuss open noteheads, usually indicating the highest structural level, and filled-in noteheads for tones of lower levels; slurs, grouping tones in an arpeggio or in linear motions with passing or neighbor tones; beams, for linear motions of higher structural level or for the arpeggiation of the bass; broken ties, for repeated or sustained tones; diagonal lines to realign displaced notes; diagonal beams, connecting successive notes that belong to the same chord ("unfolding"); etc.

== Techniques of prolongation ==
The meat of a Schenkerian analysis is in showing how a background structure expands until it results in the succession of musical events on the surface of the composition itself. Schenker refers to this process under the term Auskomponierung, literally "composing out", but more often translated as "elaboration". Modern Schenkerians usually prefer the term "prolongation", stressing that elaborations develop the events along the time axis.

Schenker writes:

In practical art the main problem is how to realize the concept of harmony in a live content. In Chopin's Prelude, Op. 28, No 6, thus, it is the motif

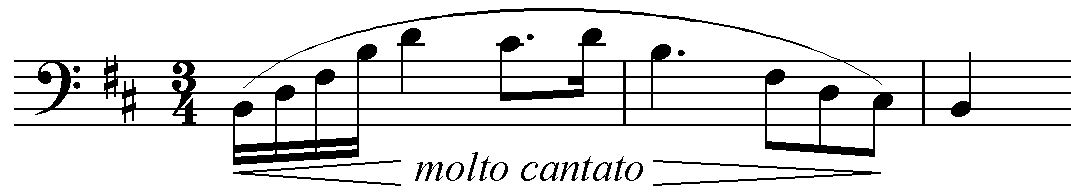
Chord Arpeggio

that gives life to the abstract concept of the triad, B, D, F-sharp.

The elaboration of the triad, here mainly in the form of an arpeggio, loads it with "live content", with meaning. Elaborations take the form of diminutions, replacing the total duration of the elaborated event by shorter events in larger number. By this, notes are displaced both in pitch and in rhythmic position. The analysis to some extent aims at restoring displaced notes to their "normal" position and explaining how and why they were displaced.

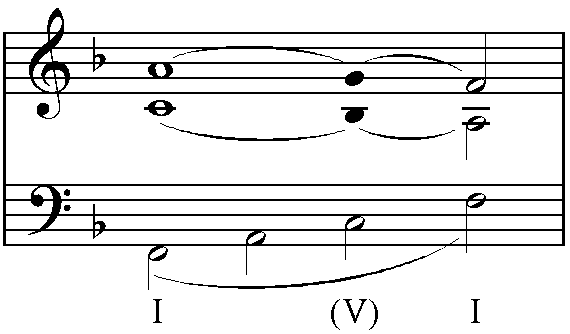
Elaboration of the F major chord

One aspect of Schenkerian analysis is that it does not view the work as built from a succession of events, but as the growth of new events from within events of higher level, much as a tree develops twigs from its branches and branches from its trunk: it is in this sense that Schenkerian theory must be considered organicist. The example shown here may at first be considered a mere elaboration of an F major chord, an arpeggiation in three voices, with passing notes (shown here in black notes without stem) in the two higher voices: it is an exemplification of the tonal space of F major. The chord labelled (V) at first merely is a "divider at the fifth". However, the meeting of the fifth (C) in the bass arpeggiation with the passing notes may also be understood as producing a dominant chord, V, arising from within the tonic chord I. This is the situation found at the beginning of Haydn's Sonata in F major, Hob. XVI:29, where the (incomplete) dominant chord appears at the very end of bar 3, while the rest of the fragment consists of arpeggios (with neighbor notes) of the F chord:

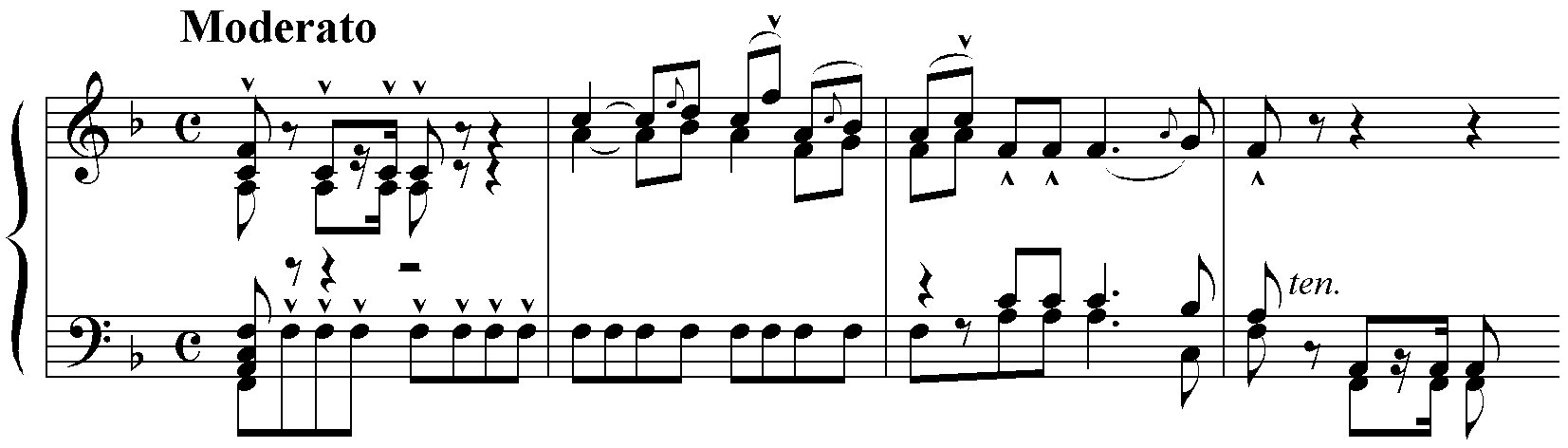

=== Arpeggiation, neighbour note, passing note ===
Arpeggiation is the simplest form of elaboration. It delimits a tonal space for elaboration, but lacks the melodic dimension that would allow further developments: it "remains a harmonic phenomenon". From the very structure of triads (chords), it follows that arpeggiations remain disjunct and that any filling of their space involves conjunct motion. Schenker distinguishes two types of filling of the tonal space: 1) neighbor notes (Nebennoten), ornamenting one single note of the triad by being adjacent to it. These are sometimes referred to generically as "adjacencies"; 2) passing notes, which pass by means of stepwise motion from one note to another and fill the space in between, and are thus sometimes referred to as "connectives". Both neighbor notes and passing notes are dissonances. They may be made consonant by their coinciding with other notes (as in the Haydn example above) and, once consonant, may delimit further tonal spaces open to further elaborations. Insofar as chords consist of several voices, arpeggiations and passing notes always involve passing from one voice to another.

=== Linear progression ===
A linear progression (Zug) is the stepwise filling of some consonant interval. It usually is underlined in graphic analyses with a slur from the first note of the progression to the last. The most elementary linear progressions are determined by the tonal space that they elaborate: they span from the prime to the third, from the third to the fifth or from the fifth to the octave of the triad, in ascending or descending direction. Schenker writes: "there are no other tonal spaces than those of 1–3, 3–5, and 5–8. There is no origin for passing-tone- progressions, or for melody" Linear progressions, in other words, may be either third progressions (Terzzüge) or fourth progressions (Quartzüge); larger progressions result from a combination of these. Linear progressions may be incomplete (deceptive) when one of their tones is replaced by another, but nevertheless suggested by the harmony. In the example below, the first bars of Beethoven's Sonata Op. 109, the bass line descends from E_{3} to E_{2}. F♯_{2} is replaced by B_{1} to mark the cadence, but it remains implicit in the B chord. In addition, the top voice answers the bass line by a voice exchange, E_{4}–F♯_{4}–G♯_{4} above G♯_{2}–(F♯_{2})–E_{2}, in bar 3, after a descending arpeggio of the E major chord. The bass line is doubled in parallel tenths by the alto voice, descending from G♯_{4} to G♯_{3}, and the tenor voice alternatively doubles the soprano and the bass, as indicated by the dotted slurs. It is the bass line that governs the passage as a whole: it is the "leading progression", on which all the other voices depend and which best expresses the elaboration of the E major chord.

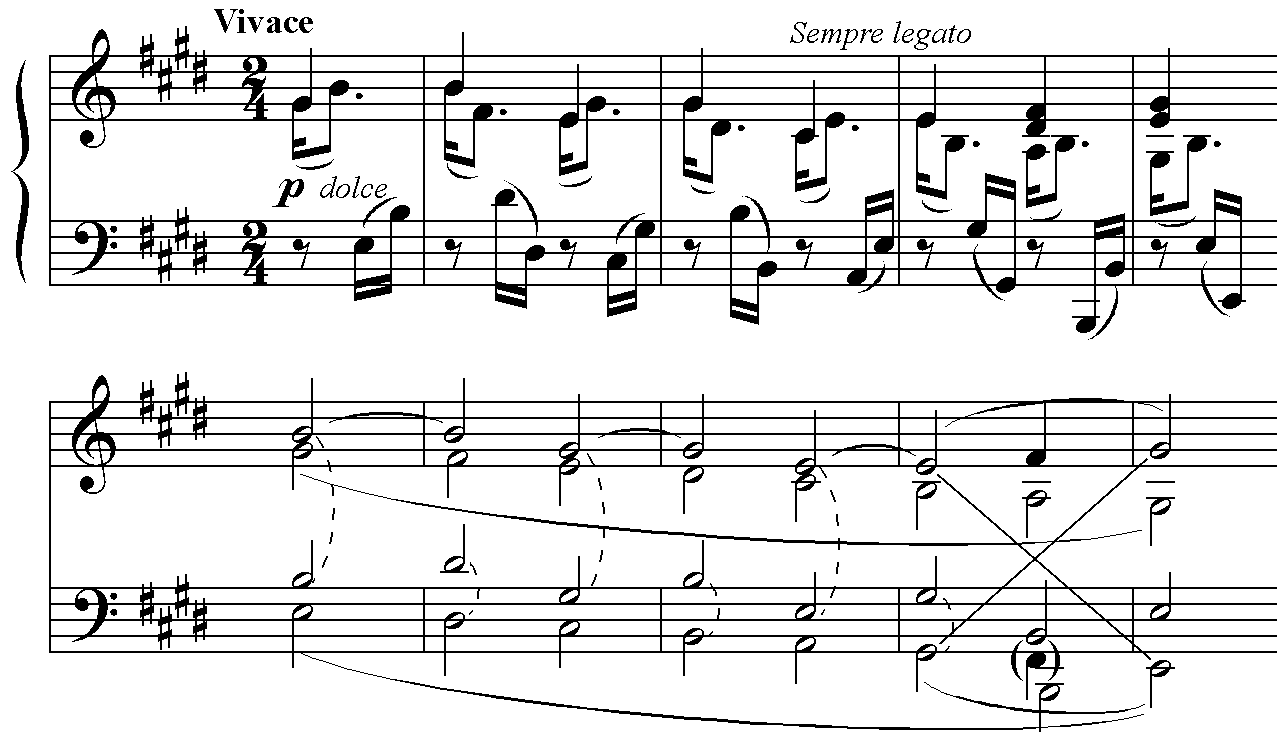
Reduction Original

Schenker describes lines covering a seventh or a ninth as "illusory", considering that they stand for a second (with a register transfer): they do not fill a tonal space, they pass from one chord to another.

=== Lines between voices, reaching over ===
Passing tones filling the intervals of a chord may be considered forming lines between the voices of this chord. At the same time, if the chord tones themselves are involved in lines from one chord to another (as usually is the case), lines of lower level unfurl between lines of higher level. The most interesting case is when the lines link an inner voice to the upper voice. This may happen not only in ascending (a case usually described as a "line from an inner voice"), but also in descending, if the inner voice has been displaced above the upper line by a register transfer, a case known as "reaching over" (Übergreifen, also translated as superposition or overlapping). In the example from Schubert's Wanderers Nachtlied below, the descending line G♭–F–E♭–D♭ at the end of the first bar may be read as a reaching over.

=== Unfolding ===
Unfolding (Ausfaltung) is an elaboration by which several voices of a chord or of a succession of chords are combined in one single line "in such a manner that a tone of the upper voice is connected to a tone of the inner voice and then moves back, or the reverse". At the end of Schubert's Wanderers Nachtlied op. 4 no. 3, the vocal melody unfolds two voices of the succession I–V–I; the lower voice, B♭–A♭–G♭, is the main one, expressing the tonality of G♭ major; the upper voice, D♭–C♭–B♭, is doubled one octave lower in the right hand of the accompaniment:

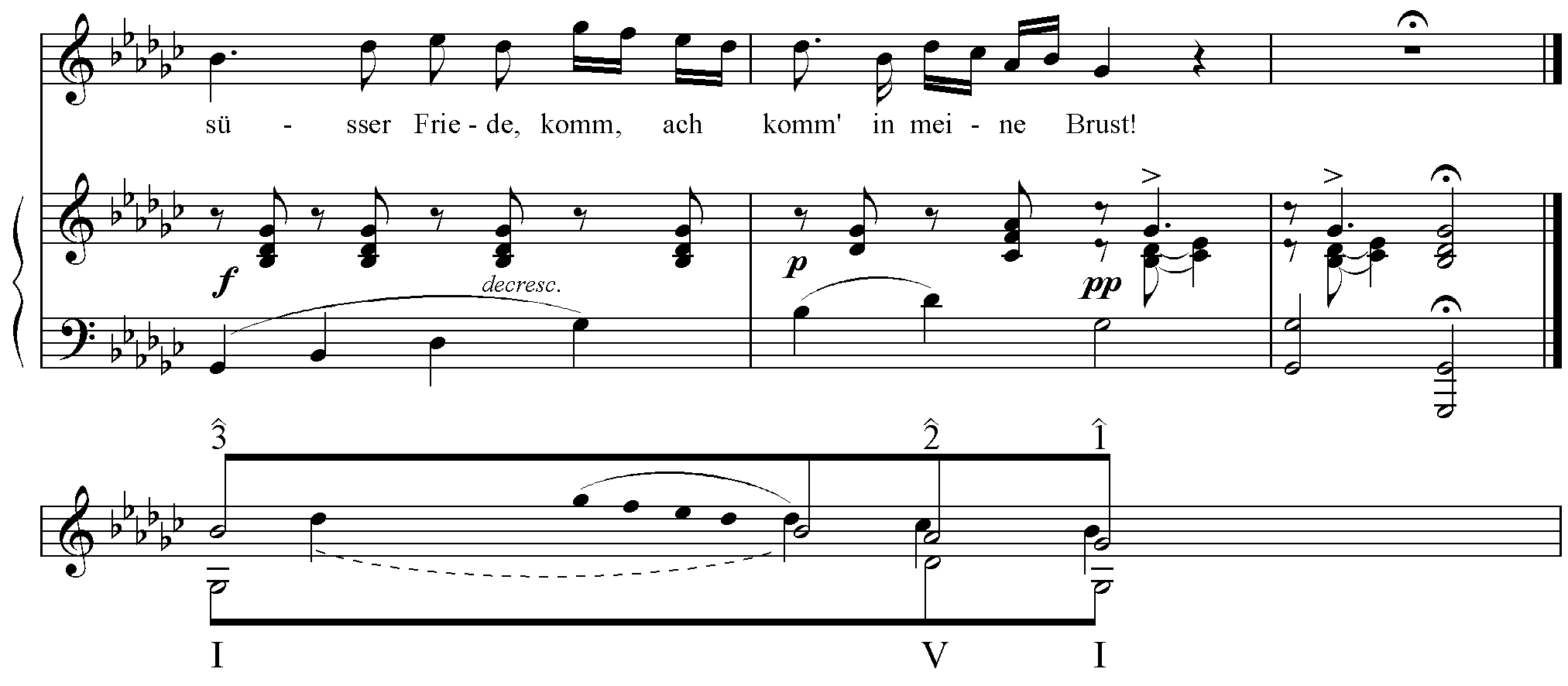
Reduction Original

In his later writings (from 1930 onwards), Schenker sometimes used a special sign to denote the unfolding, an oblique beam connecting notes of the different voices that are conceptually simultaneous, even if they are presented in succession in the single line performing the unfolding.

=== Register transfer, coupling ===
"Register transfer" is the motion of one or several voices into a different octave (i.e., into a different register). Schenker considers that music normally unfolds in one register, the "obligatory register" (Ger. Obligate Lage), but at times is displaced to higher or lower registers. These are called, respectively, "ascending register transfer" (Ger. Höherlegung) and "descending register transfer" (Ger. Tieferlegung). This becomes a key expressive tool in keyboard music due to limited timbral nuance. "Coupling" is when the transferred parts retain a link with their original register. The work, in this case, appears to unfold in two registers in parallel.

=== Voice exchange ===
Voice exchange is a common device in counterpoint theory. Schenkerians view it as a means of elaborating a chord by modifying its position. Two voices exchange their notes, often with passing notes in between. At the end of the example of Beethoven's Op. 109 above, the bass and soprano exchange their notes: G♯ is transferred from bass to soprano, while E is transferred from soprano to bass. The exchange is marked by crossed lines between these notes.

== Elaboration of the fundamental structure ==
The elaborations of the fundamental structure deserve a specific discussion because they may determine the form of the work in which they occur.

=== Initial ascent, initial arpeggiation ===
The starting point of the fundamental line, its "head note" (Kopfton), may be reached only after an ascending motion, either an initial ascending line (Anstieg) or an initial arpeggiation, which may take more extension than the descending fundamental line itself. This results in melodies in arch form. Schenker decided only in 1930 that the fundamental line should be descending: in his earlier analyses, initial ascending lines often are described as being part of the Urlinie itself.

=== First-order neighbor note ===
Schenker stresses that the head note of the fundamental line often is decorated by a neighbor note "of the first order", which must be an upper neighbor because "the lower neighboring note would give the impression of the interruption". The neighbor note of the first order is –– or ––: the harmony supporting it often is the IVth or VIth degree, which may give rise to a section of the work at the subdominant.

=== Articulation of the span from I to V in the bass arpeggiation ===
The canonic form of the bass arpeggiation is I–V–I. The second interval, V–I, forms under – the perfect authentic cadence and is not susceptible of elaboration at the background level. The first span, I–V, on the other hand, usually is elaborated. The main cases include:

==== I–III–V ====
This is the complete arpeggiation of the triad. Once elaborated, it may consist in a succession of three tonalities, especially in pieces in minor. In these cases, III stands for a tonicisation of the major relative. This often occurs in Sonata forms in minor, where the first thematic group elaborates degree I, the second thematic group is in the major relative, degree III, and the development leads to V before the recapitulation in the tonic key.

==== I–IV–V or I–II–V ====
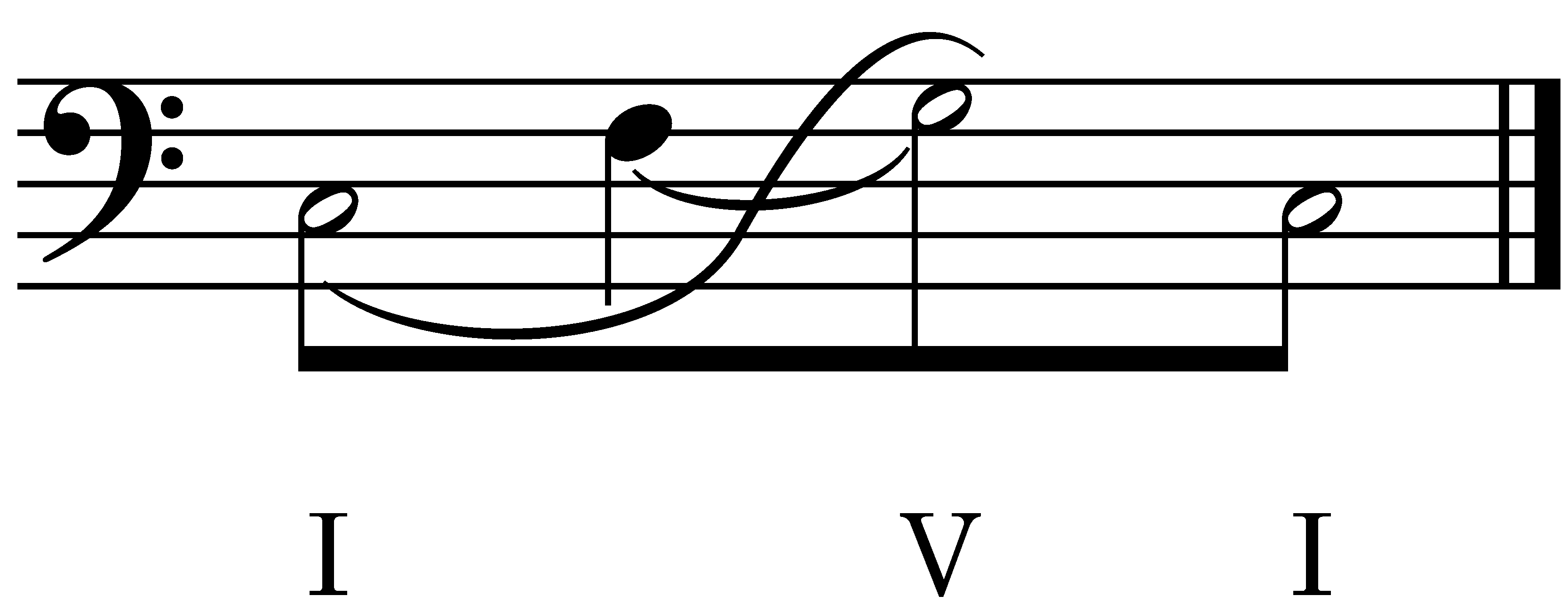
Bass elaboration I–IV–V–I

Even though he never discussed them at length, these elaborations occupy a very special place in Schenker's theory. One might even argue that no description of an Ursatz properly speaking is complete if it does not include IV or II at the background level. Schenker uses a special sign to denote this situation, the double curve shown in the example hereby, crossing the slur that links IV (or II) to V. That IV (here, F) is written as a quarter note indicates that it is of lower rank than I and V, notated as half notes. Here there is an unexpected link between Schenkerian theory and Riemann's theory of tonal functions, a fact that might explain Schenker's reluctance to be more explicit about it. In modern Schenkerian analysis, the chord of IV or II is often dubbed the "predominant" chord, as the chord that prepares the dominant one, and the progression may be labelled "T–P–D–T", for tonic–predominant–dominant–tonic.

==== I–II–III–IV–V ====
The dominant chord may be linked to the tonic by a stepwise linear progression. In such case, one of the chords in the progression, II, III or IV, usually takes preeminence, reducing the case to one or the other described above.

=== Interruption ===
The interruption (Unterbrechung) is an elaboration of the fundamental line, which is interrupted at its last passing note,, before it reaches its goal. As a result, the bass arpeggiation itself is also interrupted at the divider at the fifth (V). Both the fundamental line and the bass arpeggiation are bound to return to their starting point and the fundamental structure repeats itself, eventually reaching its goal. The interruption is the main form-generating elaboration: it often is used in binary forms (when the first part ends on the dominant) or, if the elaboration of the "dividing dominant", above V, takes some importance, it may produce ternary form, typically sonata form.

=== Mixture ===
Schenker calls "mixture" (Mischung) the change of mode of the tonic, i.e. the replacement of its major third by the minor one, or of its minor third by the major one. The elaboration of the resulting chord may give rise to a section in minor within a work in major, or the reverse.

=== Transference of the fundamental structure ===
The forms of the fundamental structure may be repeated at any level of the work. "Every transferred form [of the fundamental structure] has the effect of a self-contained structure within which the upper and lower voices delimit a single tonal space". That is to say that any phrase in a work could take the form of a complete fundamental structure. Many classical themes (e.g. the theme to the set of variations in Mozart's K. 331 piano sonata) form self-contained structure of this type. This resemblance of local middleground structures to background structures is part of the beauty and appeal of Schenkerian analysis, giving it the appearance of a recursive construction.

== Legacy and responses ==
=== Europe before World War II ===
Schenker himself mentioned in a letter of 1927 to his student Felix-Eberhard von Cube that his ideas continued "to be felt more widely: Edinburgh [with John Petrie Dunn], (also New York [probably with George Wedge]), Leipzig [with Reinhard Oppel], Stuttgart [with Herman Roth], Vienna (myself and [Hans] Weisse), [Otto] Vrieslander in Munich […], yourself [von Cube] in Duisburg, and [August] Halm [in Wickersdorf, Thuringia]." Von Cube, with Moritz Violin, another of Schenker's students, founded the Schenker Institut in Hamburg in 1931. Oswald Jonas published Das Wesen des musikalischen Kunstwerkes in 1932, and Felix Salzer Sinn und Wesen der abendländischen Mehrstimmigkeit in 1935, both based on Schenkerian concepts. Oswald Jonas and Felix Salzer founded and edited together the short-lived Schenkerian journal Der Dreiklang (Vienna, 1937–1938).

World War II brought European studies to a halt. Schenker's publications were placed under Nazi ban and some were confiscated by the Gestapo. It is in the United States that Schenkerian analysis knew its first important developments. This history has been contextualized by comments on both sides of the Atlantic, notably by Martin Eybl and Philip A. Ewell.

=== Early reception in the US ===
George Wedge taught some of Schenker's ideas as early as 1925 in the Institute of Musical Arts, New York. Victor Vaughn Lytle, who had studied with Hans Weisse in Vienna, wrote what may be the earliest English-language essay dealing with Schenkerian concepts, "Music Composition of the Present" (The American Organist, 1931), without however really crediting Schenker for them. Weisse himself, who had studied with Schenker at least from 1912, immigrated to the United States and began teaching Schenkerian analysis at the Mannes School of Music in New York in 1931. One of his students, Adele T. Katz, devoted an article to "Heinrich Schenker's Method of Analysis" in 1935, then an important book, Challenge to Musical Tradition, in 1945, in which she applied Schenkerian analytical concepts not only to some of Schenker's favorite composers, Johann Sebastian and Philipp Emmanuel Bach, Haydn and Beethoven, but also to Wagner, Debussy, Stravinsky and Schoenberg: this certainly represents one of the earliest attempts to widen the corpus of Schenkerian analysis.

The opinions of the critics were not always positive, however. Roger Sessions published in Modern Music 12 (May–June 1935) an obituary article under the title "Heinrich Schenker's Contribution" where, after having recognized some of Schenker's achievements, he criticizes the development of the last years, until Der freie Satz (which he admits is not yet available in the US) and concludes that "It is precisely when Schenker's teachings leave the domain of exact description and enter that of dogmatic and speculative analysis that they become essentially sterile". The most raging attack against Schenker came in the "Editorial" that Paul Henry Lang devoted in The Musical Quarterly 32/2 (April 1946) to the recently published book by Adele Katz, Challenge to Musical Tradition, which he opposed to Donald Tovey's Beethoven, also published in 1945; his attacks also target Schenker's followers, probably the American ones. He writes:

Schenker's and his disciples' musical theory and philosophy is not art, its whole outlook – at least as expressed in their writings – lacks feeling. There was seldom a colder spirit than theirs; the only warmth one feels is the warmth of dogmatism. Music interests them only insofar as it fits into their system ... In reality music serves only to furnish grist for the mill of their insatiable theoretical mind, not for their heart or imagination. There is no art, no poetry, in this remarkable system which deals with the raw materials of music with a virtuoso hand. Schenker and his disciples play with music as others play chess, not even suspecting what fantasy, what sentimental whirlpools lie at the bottom of every composition. They see lines only, no colors, and their ideas are cold and orderly. But music is color and warmth, which are the values of a concrete art.

=== After World War II ===
==== Translations ====
Schenker left about 4000 pages of printed text, of which the translations at first were astonishingly slow. Nearly all have been translated into English, and the project Schenker Documents Online is busy with the edition and translation of more than 100 000 manuscript pages. Translations in other languages remain slow. See also Schenker's Writings on Theory, on the website of the EuroT&AM.

- 1895 Der Geist der musikalischen Technik.
  - 2007 Transl. by W. Pastille, in N. Cook, The Schenker Project, Appendix, pp. 319–332.
- 1904 Ein Beitrag zur Ornamentik.
  - 1976 Transl. by H. Siegel, Music Forum 4, pp. 1–139.
  - 1979 Japanese translation by A. Noro and A. Tamemoto.
- 1906 Harmonielehre.
  - 1954 Harmony, transl. by Elisabeth Mann Borgese, edited and annotated by Oswald Jonas ISBN 9780226737348 (with editorial cuts in text and music examples)
  - 1990 Tratado de Armonia, Spanish transl. by R. Barce.
- 1910 Kontrapunkt I.
  - 1987 Counterpoint I, transl. by J. Rothgeb and J. Thym.
- 1912 Beethovens neunte Sinfonie, 1912
  - 1992 Beethoven's Ninth Symphony: a Portrayal of its Musical Content, with Running Commentary on Performance and Literature as well, transl. by J. Rothgeb, 1992.
  - 2010 Japanese transl. by H. Nishida and T. Numaguchi.
- 1913 Beethoven, Sonate E dur op. 109 (Erläuterungsausgabe).
  - 2012 Japanese transl. by M. Yamada, H. Nishida and T. Numaguchi.
  - 2015 English transl. by J. Rothgeb.
- 1914 Beethoven, Sonate As dur op. 110 (Erläuterungsausgabe).
  - 2013 Japanese transl. by M. Yamada, H. Nishida and T. Numaguchi.
  - 2015 English transl. by J. Rothgeb.
- 1915 Beethoven, Sonate C moll op. 111 (Erläuterungsausgabe).
  - 2015 English transl. by J. Rothgeb.
- 1920 Beethoven, Sonate A dur op. 101 (Erläuterungsausgabe).
  - 2015 English transl. by J. Rothgeb.
- 1921–1924 Der Tonwille (10 vols.)
  - 2004–2005 Der Tonwille, transl. under the direction of William Drabkin.
- 1922 Kontrapunkt II.
  - 1987 Counterpoint II, transl. by J. Rothgeb and J. Thym.
- 1922 "Haydn: Sonate Es-Dur", Der Tonwille III, pp. 3–21.
  - 1988 Transl. by W. Petty, Theoria 3, pp. 105–160.
- 1923 "J. S. Bach: Zwölf kleine Präludien Nr. 2 [BWV 939]", Der Tonwille IV, 1923, p. 7.
  - [2007] French transl. by N. Meeùs.
- 1923 "J. S. Bach: Zwölf kleine Präludien Nr. 5 [BWV 926]", Der Tonwille V, pp. 8–9.
  - [2006] French transl. by N. Meeùs.
- 1924 "Mendelssohn: Venetianisches Gondellied, op. 30, Nr. 6", Der Tonwille X, pp. 25–29.
  - [2011] French transl. by N. Meeùs.
- 1924 "Schumann: Kinderszenen Nr. 1, Von fremden Ländern und Menschen", Der Tonwille X, pp. 34–35.
  - [2011] French transl. by N. Meeùs.
- 1924 "Schumann: Kinderszenen op. 15, Nr. 9, Träumerei", Der Tonwille X, pp. 36–39.
  - [2011] French transl. by N. Meeùs.
- 1925 Beethovens V. Sinfonie. Darstellung des musikalischen Inhaltes nach der Handschrift unter fortlaufender Berücksichtigung des Vortrages und der Literatur, Vienne, Tonwille Verlag and Universal Edition. Reprint 1970.
  - 1971 Ludwig van Beethoven: Symphony N. 5 in C minor, partial transl. by E. Forbes and F. J. Adams jr., New York, Norton, 1971 (Norton Critical Score 9), pp. 164–182.
  - 2000 Japanese transl. by T. Noguchi.
- 1925–1930 Das Meisterwerk in der Musik, 3 vols.
  - 1998 transl. under the direction of William Drabkin.
- 1925 "Die Kunst der Improvisation", Das Meisterwerk in der Musik I, pp. 9–40.
  - 1973 Transl. by S. Kalib, "Thirteen Essays from the Three Yearbooks Das Meisterwerk in der Musik: An Annotated Translation," PhD diss., Northwestern University.
- 1925 "Weg mit dem Phrasierungsbogen", Das Meisterwerk in der Musik I, pp. 41–60.
  - 1973 Transl. by S. Kalib, "Thirteen Essays from the Three Yearbooks Das Meisterwerk in der Musik: An Annotated Translation," PhD diss., Northwestern University.
- 1925 "Joh. S. Bach: Sechs Sonaten für Violine. Sonata III, Largo", Das Meisterwerk in der Musik I, pp. 61–73.
  - 1973 Transl. by S. Kalib, "Thirteen Essays from the Three Yearbooks Das Meisterwerk in der Musik: An Annotated Translation," PhD diss., Northwestern University.
  - 1976 Transl. by J. Rothgeb, The Music Forum 4, pp. 141–159.
- 1925 "Joh. S. Bach: Zwölf kleine Präludien, Nr. 6 [BWV 940]", Das Meisterwerk in der Musik I, pp. 99–105.
  - [2010] French transl. by N. Meeùs.
- 1925 "Joh. S. Bach: Zwölf kleine Präludien, Nr. 12 [BWV 942]", Das Meisterwerk in der Musik I, 1925, pp. 115–123.
  - [2006] French transl. by N. Meeùs.
- 1925 "Domenico Scarlatti: Keyboard Sonata in D minor, [L.413]", Das Meisterwerk in der Music I, pp. 125–135.
  - 1986 Transl. by J. Bent, Music Analysis 5/2-3, pp. 153–164.
- 1925 "Domenico Scarlatti: Keyboard Sonata in G major, [L.486]", Das Meisterwerk in der Music I, pp. 137–144.
  - 1986 Transl. by J. Bent, Music Analysis 5/2-3, pp. 171–179.
- 1925 "Chopin: Etude Ges-Dur op. 10, Nr. 5", Das Meisterwerk in der Musik I, pp. 161–173.
  - 1973 Transl. by S. Kalib, "Thirteen Essays from the Three Yearbooks Das Meisterwerk in der Musik: An Annotated Translation," PhD diss., Northwestern University.
- 1925 "Erläuterungen", Das Meisterwerk in der Music I, pp. 201–205. (Also published in Der Tonwille 9 and 10 and in Das Meisterwerk in der Musik II.)
  - 1973 Transl. by S. Kalib, "Thirteen Essays from the Three Yearbooks Das Meisterwerk in der Musik: An Annotated Translation," PhD diss., Northwestern University.
  - 1986 Transl. by J. Bent, Music Analysis 5/2-3, pp. 187–191.
  - [2011] French transl. by N. Meeùs.
- 1926 "Fortsetzung der Urlinie-Betrachtungen", Das Meisterwerk in der Musik II, pp. 9–42.
  - 1973 Transl. by S. Kalib, "Thirteen Essays from the Three Yearbooks Das Meisterwerk in der Musik: An Annotated Translation," PhD diss., Northwestern University.
- 1926 "Vom Organischen der Sonatenform", Das Meisterwerk in der Musik II, pp. 43–54.
  - 1968 Transl. by O. Grossman, Journal of Music Theory 12, pp. 164–183, reproduced in Readings in Schenker Analysis and Other Approaches, M. Yeston ed., New Haven, 1977, pp. 38–53.
  - 1973 Transl. by S. Kalib, "Thirteen Essays from the Three Yearbooks Das Meisterwerk in der Musik: An Annotated Translation," PhD diss., Northwestern University.
- 1926 "Das Organische der Fuge, aufgezeigt an der I. C-Moll-Fuge aus dem Wohltemperierten Klavier von Joh. Seb. Bach", Das Meisterwerk in der Musik II, pp. 55–95
  - 1973 Transl. by S. Kalib, "Thirteen Essays from the Three Yearbooks Das Meisterwerk in der Musik: An Annotated Translation," PhD diss., Northwestern University.
- 1926 "Joh. Seb. Bach: Suite III C-Dur für Violoncello-Solo, Sarabande", Das Meisterwerk in der Musik II, 1926, pp. 97–104.
  - 1970 Transl. by H. Siegel, The Music Forum 2, pp. 274–282.
- "Mozart: Sinfonie G-Moll", Das Meisterwerk in der Musik II, pp. 105–157.
  - 1973 Transl. by S. Kalib, "Thirteen Essays from the Three Yearbooks Das Meisterwerk in der Musik: An Annotated Translation," PhD diss., Northwestern University.
- "Haydn: Die Schöpfung. Die Vorstellung des Chaos", Das Meisterwerk in der Musik II, pp. 159–170.
  - 1973 Transl. by S. Kalib, "Thirteen Essays from the Three Yearbooks Das Meisterwerk in der Musik: An Annotated Translation," PhD diss., Northwestern University.
- "Ein Gegenbeispiel: Max Reger, op. 81. Variationen und Fuge über ein Thema von Joh. Seb. Bach für Klavier", Das Meisterwerk in der Musik II, pp. 171–192.
  - 1973 Transl. by S. Kalib, "Thirteen Essays from the Three Yearbooks Das Meisterwerk in der Musik: An Annotated Translation," PhD diss., Northwestern University.
- 1930 "Rameau oder Beethoven? Erstarrung oder geistiges Leben in der Musik?", Das Meisterwerk in der Musik III, pp. 9–24.
  - 1973 Transl. by S. Kalib, "Thirteen Essays from the Three Yearbooks Das Meisterwerk in der Musik: An Annotated Translation," PhD diss., Northwestern University.
- 1932 Fünf Urlinie-Tafeln.
  - 1933 Five Analyses in Sketch Form, New York, D. Mannes Music School.
  - 1969 New version with a glossary by F. Salzer: Five Graphic Music Analyses, New York, Dover.
- 1935/1956 Der freie Satz. Translations of the 2nd edition, 1956.
  - 1979 Free Composition, transl. by E. Oster, 1979.
  - 1993 L'Écriture libre, French transl. by N. Meeùs, Liège-Bruxelles, Mardaga.
  - 1997 Chinese translation by Chen Shi-Ben, Beijing, People's Music Publications.
  - 2004 Russian transl. by B. Plotnikov, Krasnoyarsk Academy of Music and Theatre.
- 2000 The Art of Performance, H. Esser ed., I. Schreier Scott transl. (Unbuplished in German.)

==== Textbooks ====
- Oswald Jonas, Das Wesen des musikalischen Kunstwerks, Wien, Universal, 1934; revised edition, Einführung in die Lehre Heinrich Schenkers. Das Wesen des musikalischen Kunstwerkes, Wien, Universal, 1972. English translation of the revised edition, Introduction to the Theory of Heinrich Schenker: The Nature of the Musical Work of Art, transl. J. Rothgeb, New York and London, Longman, 1982; 2^{d} [revised and expanded] edition, Ann Arbor, Musicalia Press, 2005.
- Felix Salzer, Structural Hearing: Tonal Coherence in Music, 2 vols., New York, Charles Boni, 1952. Reprint, 2 vols. bound as one, New York, Dover, 1982.
- Allen Forte and Steven E. Gilbert, Introduction to Schenkerian Analysis and Instructor's Manual for Introduction to Schenkerian Analysis, New York, London, Dover, 1982.
- Allen Cadwallader and David Gagné, Analysis of Tonal Music. A Schenkerian Approach, New York, Oxford University Press, 3rd edition, 2011 (1st edition, 1998).
- Edward Aldwell and Carl Schachter, Harmony and Voice Leading, Boston, Schirmer, Cengage Learning, 4th edition (with Allen Cadwallader), 2011 (1st edition, 2003).
- Tom Pankhurst, Schenkerguide. A Brief Handbook and Website for Schenkerian Analysis, New York and London, Routledge, 2008 Schenkerguide website.
- William Renwick and David Walker, Schenkerian Analysis Glossary.
- Larry J. Solomon, A Schenkerian Primer.
- Nicolas Meeùs, Análise schenkeriana, Portuguese (Brasil) translation from the French by L. Beduschi, 2008.
- Luciane Beduschi and Nicolas Meeùs, Analyse schenkérienne (in French), 2013; several earlier versions archived on the same page. Albanian translation by Sokol Shupo, available on the same webpage.

== See also ==
- Music Forum (1967–1987), music theory and analysis academic journal
- Glossary of Schenkerian analysis
