= Zug (surname) =

Zug is a surname. It is a Swiss location-based surname deriving from a town name meaning "location where nets might be drawn onto shore". Notable people with the surname include:

- Graham Zug (born 1987), American football player
- James Zug (born 1969), American writer
- Mark Zug (born 1959), American artist and illustrator
- Peter Zug (born 1958), American politician
- Szymon Bogumił Zug (1733–1807), Polish-German architect
