= Adele T. Katz =

American music theorist and teacher

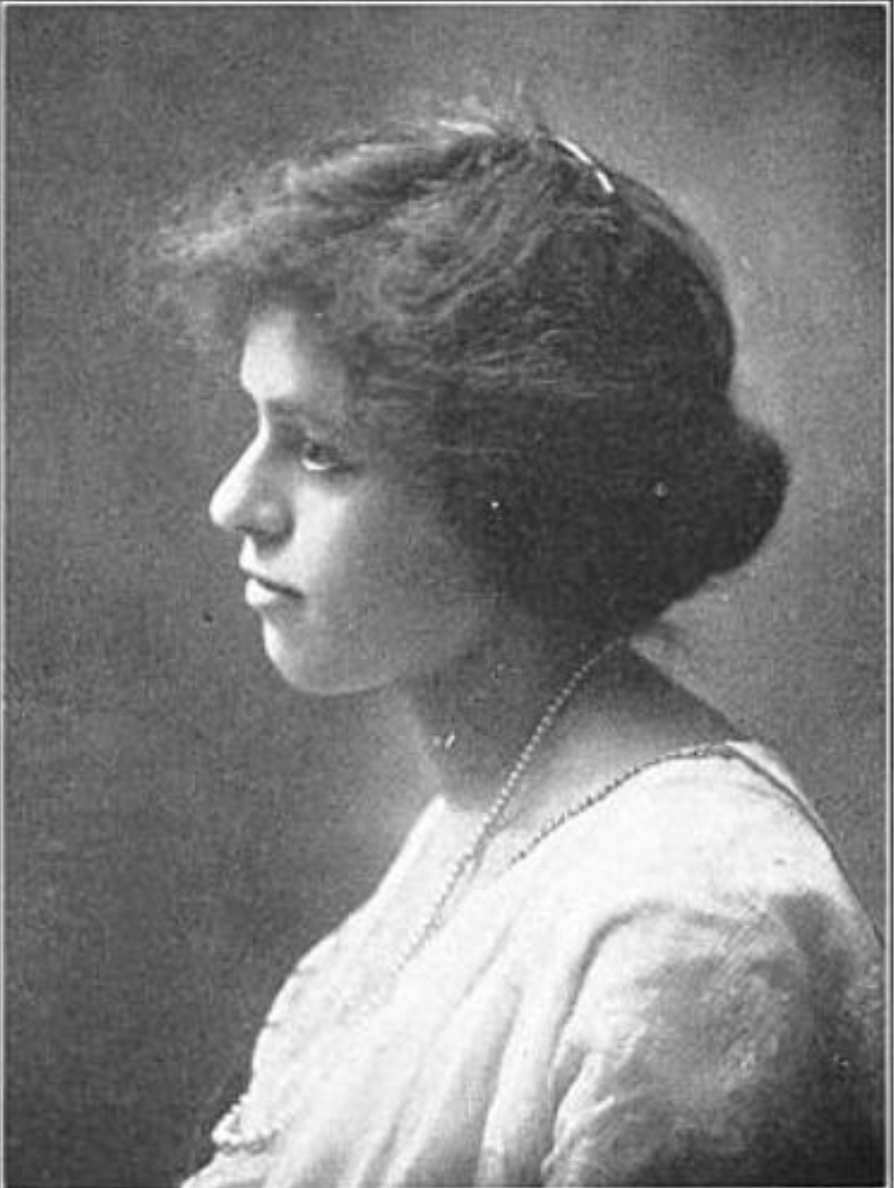
Katz in 1914

Adele Terese Katz (26 August 1887 – May 1979) was a music teacher and music theorist, and writer. She was the first person to publish English-language writings about Schenkerian analysis.

Katz was born in San Francisco, California, to Emanuel Katz (who was born in Missouri), who worked in advertising, and Hanna Gunst Katz (who was born in Talberton, Georgia), both Jewish of German descent. She had one brother, Sidney (born 1874), who followed his father in advertising. By 1910, Sidney and his father were living in Chicago, while Adele and her mother were living at 308 McDonough Street in Brooklyn, New York. By that time she was already teaching music.

From 1896 to 1907, she attended the Packer Collegiate Institute where she studied harmony with Raymond Huntington Woodman and violin with Henry Schradieck. She also studied theory and composition with Alfredo Casella, Gena Branscombe and Mortimer Wilson. In 1927, she moved to 277 West End Avenue in Manhattan, where she lived until her death in 1979.

From 1928 through 1935, she was a student at the David Mannes Music School (now the Mannes College The New School for Music), where she studied composition with David Mannes and theory with Hans Weisse. For a single season (1928–29), she was also a student at the Curtis Institute where she studied composition with Rosario Scalero.

Her first teaching position was with the Rand School of Social Science (1931–40). She also held positions at The New School, the 92nd Street Y, Mannes College of Music (Westchester Branch), Teachers College, Columbia University. Her last teaching position was with the Studios of Music Education, a position she held from the mid-1940s until 1969. She also practiced music therapy at the Manhattan Psychiatric Center. From 1936 to 1941 she was director of the Woodmere Choral Club.

In speaking of her 1935 article "Henrich Schenker's Method of Analysis", Berry notes: "she issued the first substantive English-language distillation of Schenkerian concepts." Her 1945 book Challenge to Musical Tradition (and Schenkerian theory at large) was heavily criticized in Paul Henry Lang's famous "Editorial" in The Musical Quarterly 32/2 (1946).

== Writings ==
- "Heinrich Schenker's Method of Analysis." Musical Quarterly 1935.
- Challenge to Musical Tradition: A New Concept of Tonality. New York: Alfred Knopf, 1945.
- Hearing—Gateway to Music; a Complete Foundation for Musical Understanding. Evanston, IL: Summy-Birchard Pub. Co., 1959. (with Ruth Halle Rowen, co-author).
