= Linear progression =

Musical motion between two harmonic tones

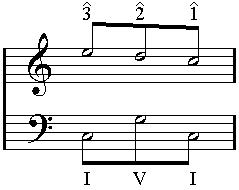
Urlinie: -- over I-V-I.

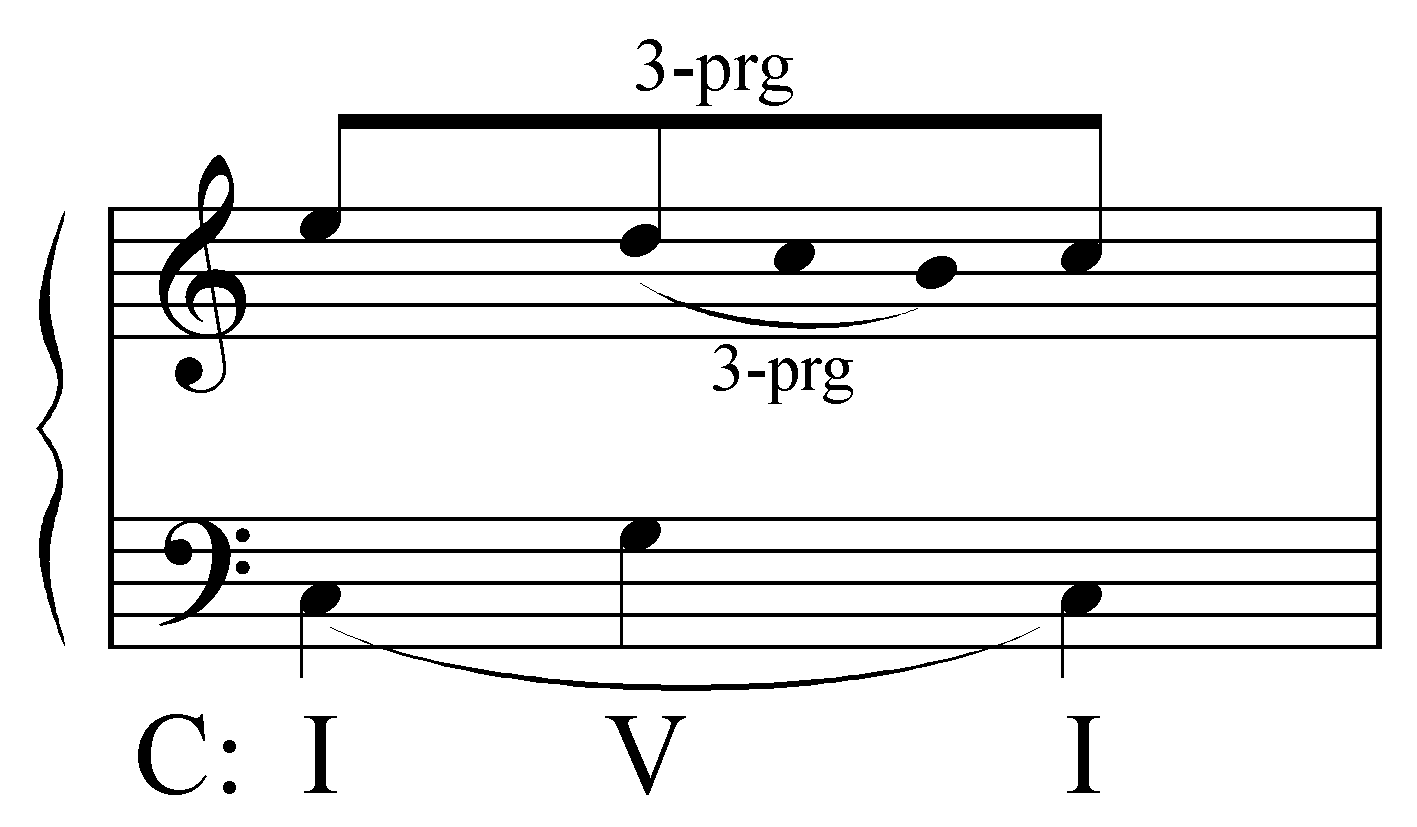
Decorated third progression. Whereas originally D5 was the nonchord tone in E5-(D5)-C5, here it becomes a chord tone because it is supported by G3 in the bass, and this chord itself is elaborated D5-(C5)-B4, where C5 is the nonchord tone.

In music, particularly Schenkerian analysis, a linear progression (Auskomponierungszug or Zug, abbreviated: Zg.) is a passing note elaboration involving stepwise melodic motion in one direction between two harmonic tones. "The compositional unfolding of a specific interval, one of the intervals of the chord of nature." For example: -- over the tonic. According to Schenker: "A linear progression always presupposes a passing note; there can be no linear progression without a passing note, no passing note without a linear progression." In German Zug may be combined with prefixes to create related words such as Untergreifzug, a linear progression rising from a lower voice, Uebergreifzug ("reaching over"), a linear progression overlapping another, or Terzzug, linear progression through a third. The term Zug may best be translated as "a direct, unimpeded motion from one place to another."

Linear progressions prolong harmonies through elaboration, or filling-in with dissonant notes, of a leap between two consonant notes from different voices in a chord. In English they may be abbreviated "prg." such as 3-prg. for 'third progression' (rather than "Zg.").

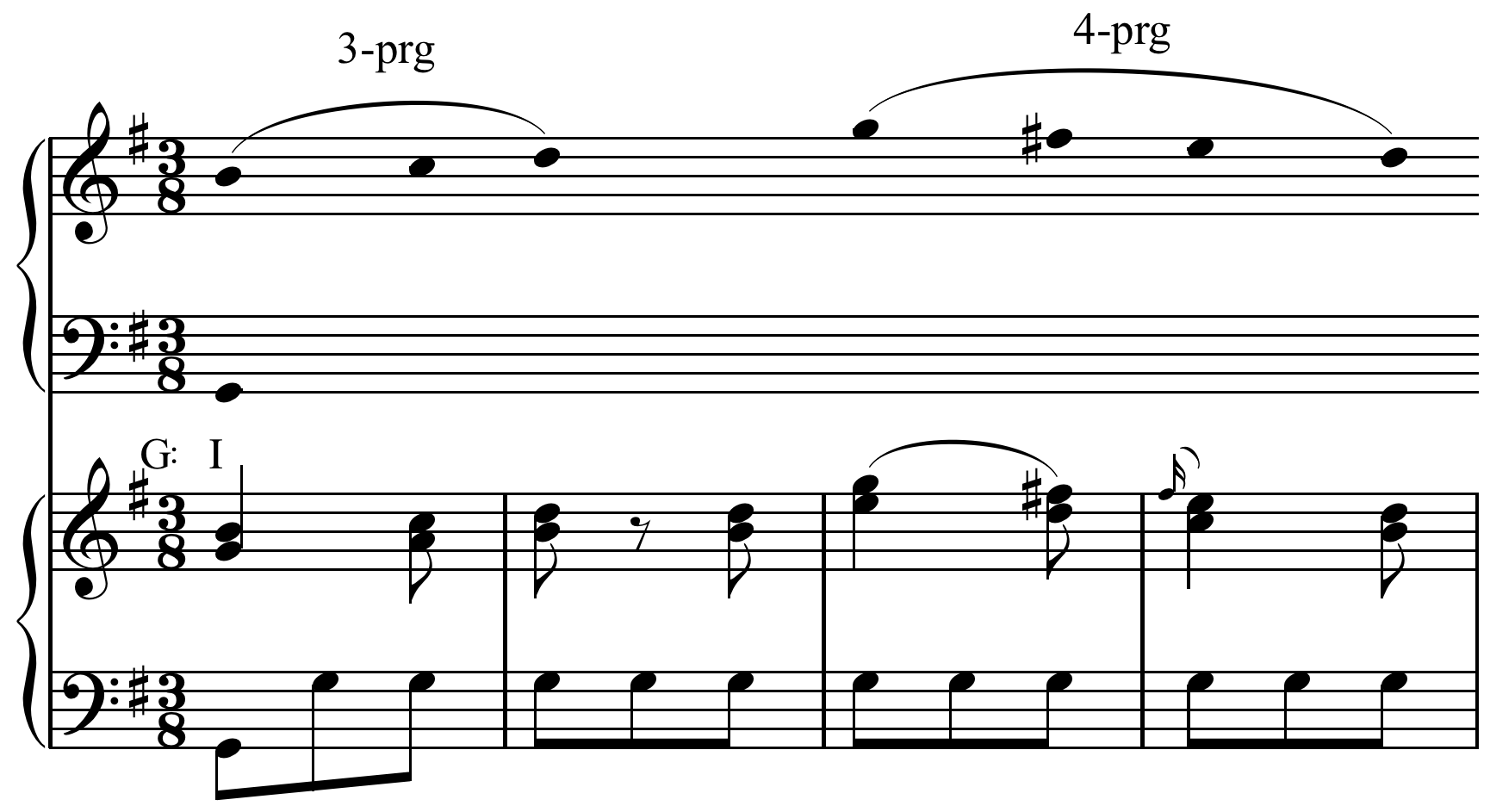
Linear progression in Mozart's Piano Sonata in G major, KV 283, no. 3 "Presto". Original shown below, Schenkerian analysis shown above.

Note that in the Mozart example above the passing tones are dissonant and unable to be embellished; however, in the Urlinie example to the right the passing tone is supported harmonically, allowing for embellishment. Also note the Schenkerian notation indicating relative hierarchical depth, surface or structural importance, where structural notes are indicated through stems and beams and surface notes are indicated through note heads only which are then slurred to stemmed and beamed notes. Thus in the bottom right example the third progression from D is a decoration of the deeper third progression from E.

== See also ==
- Chord progression
- Klang (music)
