= Zug (website) =

Defunct comedy website

- Website type: User-generated comedy
- Owners: Media Shower, Inc.
- Creators: Sir John Hargrave & Jay L Stevens
- Revenue: Advertisement, sponsored content
- Website: Zug.com
- Registration: Required
- Launched: 1995
- Current status: Closed

Zug, or ZUG, was a comedy website that was founded in 1995 by Sir John Hargrave and Jay L Stevens (based on a concept by Sir John Hargrave and Genevieve Martineau).

== History ==
Beginning as a webzine, the site featured weekly comedy articles from Sir John Hargrave and a host of collaborators. As ZUG's readership expanded, the site launched a threaded message board in 1998 called "GAB on ZUG" to allow readers to contribute additional humor content. This message board eventually became the backbone of the site, with "the world's funniest comedy community" providing everything from comedy articles to caption contests. "GAB on ZUG" was renamed "ZUG Live" in October 2008, during a complete redesign of the site.

From 1999 to 2001 ZUG took a backseat to Computer Stew, a daily comedy Web show produced, written, and directed by Hargrave and cohorts Jay Stevens, Al Natanagara, Tim Elkins, and Moses Blumenstiel for the technology Web site ZDNet. After the cancellation of Computer Stew in 2001, ZUG returned full force, with a redesigned site, a daily blog from Hargrave, and aggressive viral marketing tactics (such as an online ballot-stuffing campaign at HBO's Aspen Comedy Festival, which resulted in ZUG paralyzing the HBO servers and being disqualified from the contest).

The success of the site caught the attention of Citadel Press, which published 'Prank the Monkey', the first ZUG book, in 2007, which went on to become an Amazon.com humor bestseller. Hargrave has now released "Mischief Maker's Manual", a book of pranks for kids aged 9–12; it was released in Spring 2009 by Penguin Children's Group.

On March 21, 2013, Hargrave announced Zug would be shutting down operations on April 1 of the same year. Shortly after midnight eastern time on April 1, 2013, the site shut down. All of the reader and staff written articles, along with all of the archived ZUG Live conversations, were removed from the site.

== Articles ==
Aside from pranks, ZUG also featured comedy articles written by staff members of ZUG, as well as readers who submitted articles to the site. The staff chose the funniest article submissions, which readers could then rate for the coveted "Funniest of the Month" title. Article series from the community members included "Monster Love", where a reader posted profiles of famous serial killers on online dating sites; "Worst Bar Drink Ever", where a reader traveled to various bars to find the worst-tasting bar drink on the planet; and "Manscaping", where a reader used a hair removal product to carve superhero logos in his chest hair.

The staff also chose articles from those submitted to the site to be voted on by readers for the coveted "Funniest of the Month" title. Those who have made it to the list of the top article authors include "She's Gonna Blow: The Colon Cleansing Experiment", "The Wal-Mart Prank", and Hargrave's own "The Viagra Prank".

== ZUG Live ==
ZUG Live, which was billed as "The World's Funniest Comedy Community", was a thriving online forum where users discuss every topic imaginable, with each poster able to give and receive "funny points", which are formally known as "ZUGZ", or commonly referred to as "orbs". Frequent posters competed to be ranked on the monthly list of The World's Funniest People.

The ZUG Live software, which had been built entirely in-house, features humorous touches like the "Swearbot", which automatically turned swear words into the names of famous poets. Still, many threads had coarse language or adult discussions, so ZUG Live required its users to be over 18 years of age before they were given posting privileges.

== Name ==
While Zug is the name of a city in Switzerland, as well as the German word for train, Hargrave insists that the name has nothing to do with either, and is actually a recursive backronym for the phrase "ZUG is Utterly Great".
