= Arpeggio =

Notes in a chord played in sequence

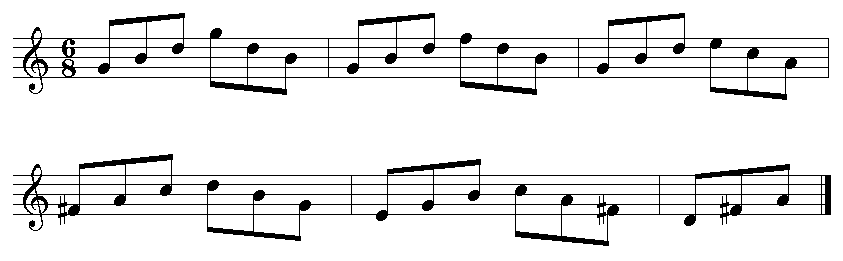
A series of arpeggios in J. S. Bach's "Jesu, Joy of Man's Desiring"

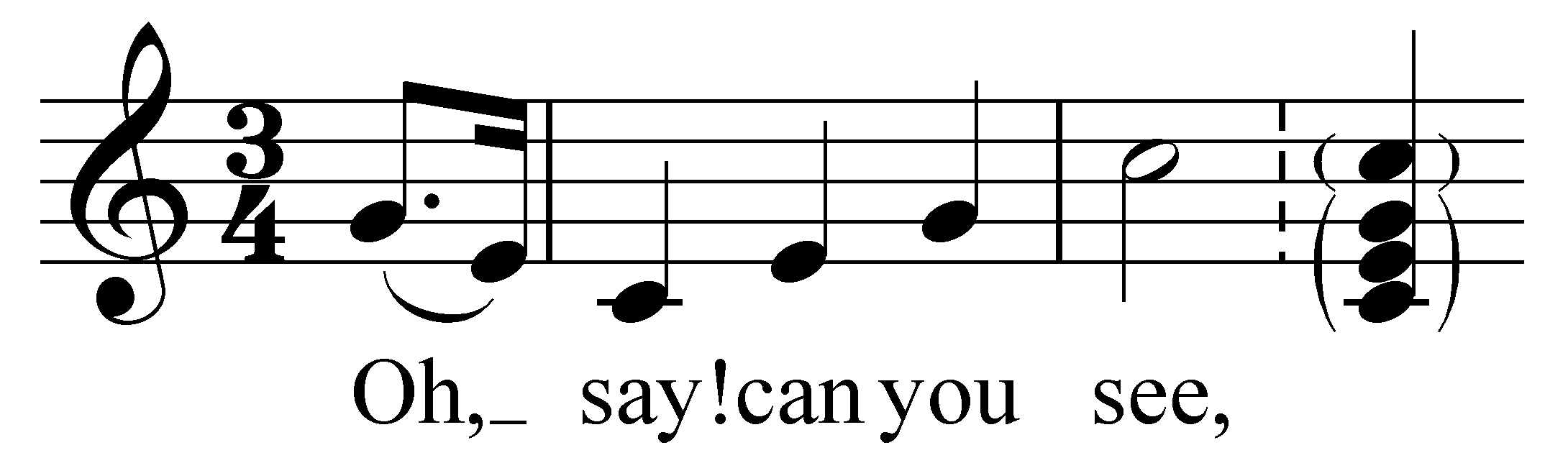
"The Star-Spangled Banner" opens with an arpeggio.

Arpeggios open Beethoven's "Moonlight Sonata" and continue as accompaniment

An arpeggio (Italian: [arˈpeddʒo], plural arpeggios or arpeggi) is a type of chord in which the notes that compose a chord are individually sounded in a progressive rising or descending order. Arpeggios on keyboard instruments may be called rolled chords.

Arpeggios may include all notes of a scale or a partial set of notes from a scale, but must contain notes of at least three pitches (two-pitch sequences are known as trills or tremolos). Arpeggios may sound notes within a single octave or span multiple octaves, and the notes may be sustained and overlap or be heard separately. An arpeggio for the chord of C major going up two octaves would be the notes (C, E, G, C, E, G, C).

In musical notation, a very rapid arpeggiated chord may be written with a wavy vertical line in front of the chord. Typically these are read as to be played from the lowest to highest note, though composers may specify a high to low sequence by adding an arrow pointing down.

Arpeggios enable composers writing for monophonic instruments that play one note at a time (such as the trumpet) to voice chords and chord progressions in musical pieces. Arpeggios are also used to help create rhythmic interest, or as melodic ornamentation in the lead or accompaniment.

Though the notes of an arpeggio are not sounded simultaneously, listeners may effectively hear the sequence of notes as forming a chord if played in quick succession. When an arpeggio also contains passing tones that are not part of the chord, certain music theorists may analyze the same musical excerpt differently.

The word arpeggio comes from the Italian word arpeggiare, which means to play on a harp. Despite its Italian origins, its plural usage is usually arpeggios rather than arpeggi.

== Uses ==
Sound sample with arpeggios
A synthesized flute-like instrument and a harp playing various chords in arpeggio, joined later by strings playing the same notes simultaneously.

8-bit sample with arpeggios
A song made in the style of 8-bit music that uses high-pitched arpeggios. Arpeggios were frequently used in 8-bit music because the sound cards of the time had limited channels and they were all monophonic. This made chords impractical.

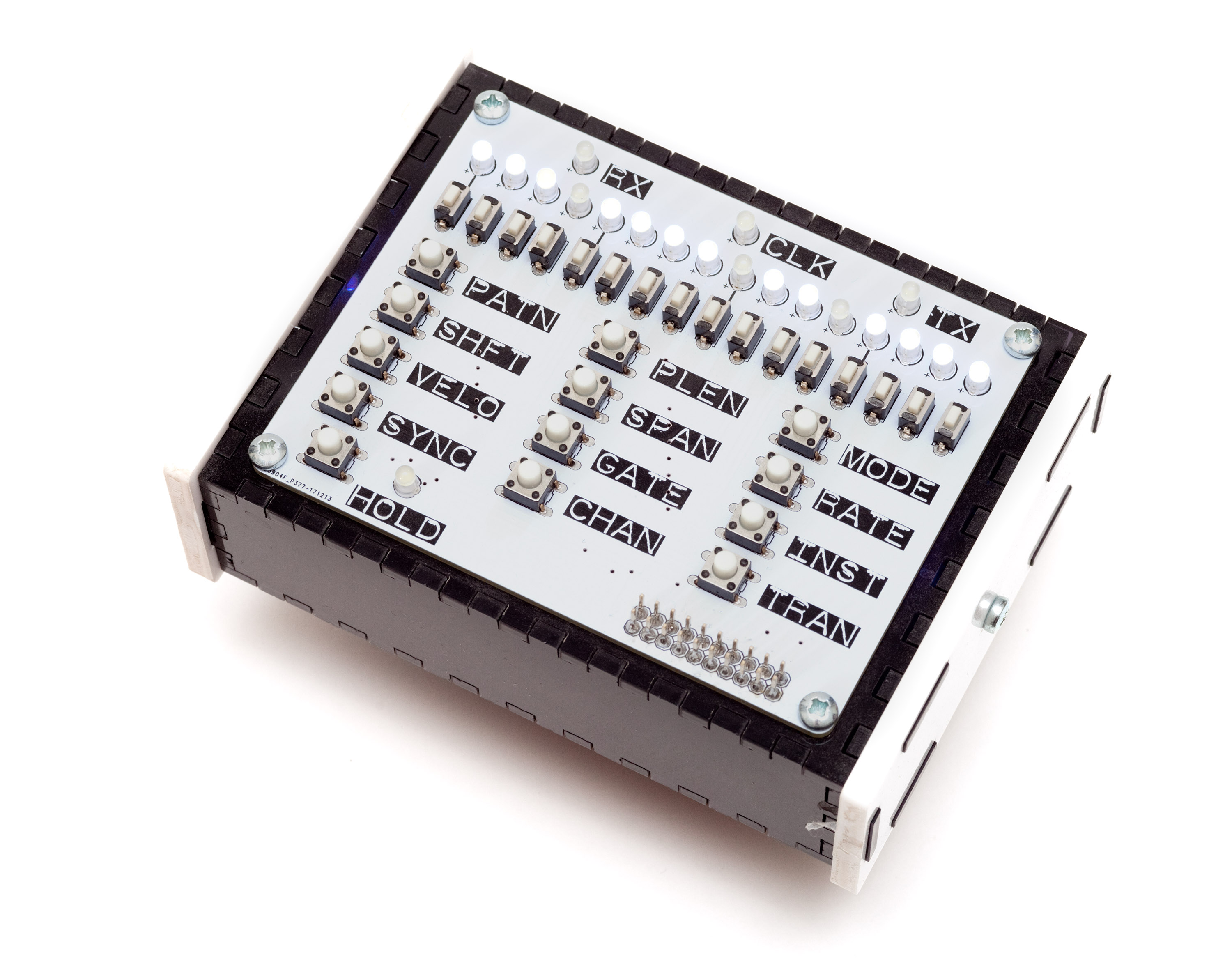
A hardware MIDI arpeggiator

Any instrument may employ arpeggiation, but arpeggios are more commonly used on instruments which serve the role of melodic lead or ornamentation. Arpeggios may be used as an alternative to continuous portamento for instruments which are not able to achieve that, or which have limitations in achieving portamento over multiple notes of a scale, such as keyboards, fretted instruments, and monophonic instruments like the flute.

Arpeggios are commonly used in many music genres and are particularly highlighted in genres with significant focus on melody and ornamentation, such as flamenco and neo-classical. Arpeggios are an important part of jazz improvisation. On guitar, sweep-picking is a technique used for rapid arpeggiation, which is most often found in rock music and heavy metal music.

Along with scales, arpeggios are a form of basic technical exercise that students use to develop intonation and technique. They can also be used in call and response ear training dictations, either alone or in conjunction with harmony dictations.

Some synthesizers contain arpeggiators, which are step sequencers designed to facilitate the playing of arpeggios and non-arpeggiated sequences.

In early video game music, arpeggios were often the only way to play a chord since sound hardware usually had a very limited number of oscillators, or voices. Instead of tying them all up to play one chord, one channel could be used to play an arpeggio, leaving the rest for drums, bass, or sound effects. A prominent example was the music of games and demos on Commodore 64's SID chip, which only had three oscillators (see also Chiptune). This technique was highly popular amongst European video game music composers for systems in the 1980s like the NES, with many transferring their knowledge from their days of composing with the Commodore 64.

== Bell chord ==
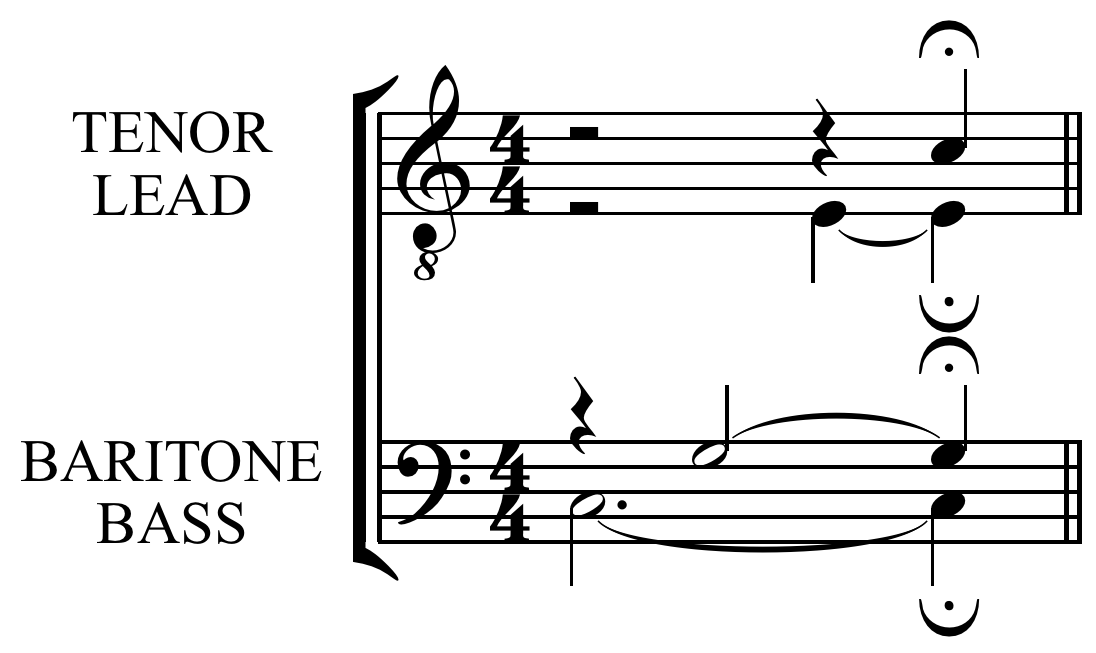
Barbershop bell chord

A bell chord, also known colloquially as "bells", is a musical arrangement technique in which a composition has separate instruments (or multiples of the same instrument) play single notes of a chord in sequence, sustaining individual notes to form the chord. It is, in effect, an arpeggio played by several instruments sequentially. This is also known as a pyramid or cascade. It is common in barbershop music.

The technique originated with jazz big bands and is a staple of trad jazz. A good example can be heard in the introduction to "The Charleston" by The Temperance Seven. "Bohemian Rhapsody" by the rock band Queen contains two occurrences of this "bell effect" in the middle section, as does the solo in "Killer Queen" starting at 1:48.

== See also ==
- Arpeggiator
- Bass arpeggiation
- Non-harmonic arpeggio
- Ostinato
- Style brisé
- Tremolo
