= Klang (music) =

Concept in Riemannian and Schenkerian theories

Major chord on C.

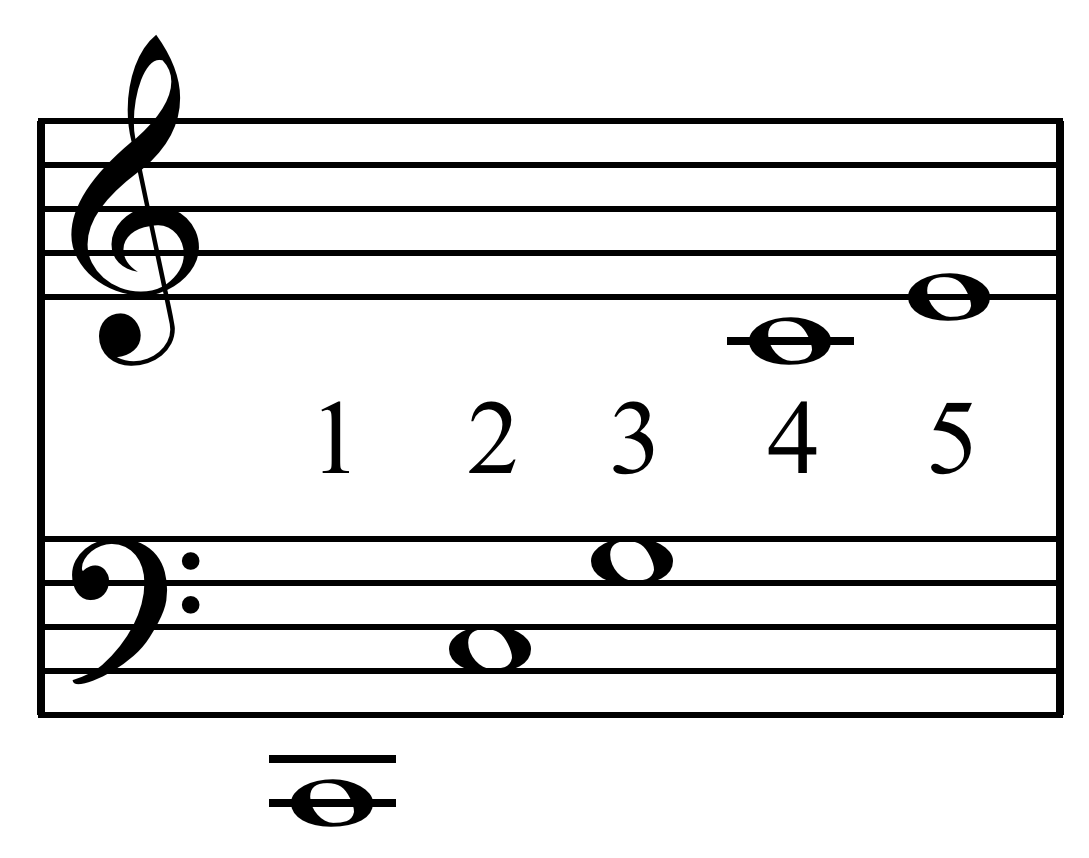
Overtone series, partials 1-5 numbered.

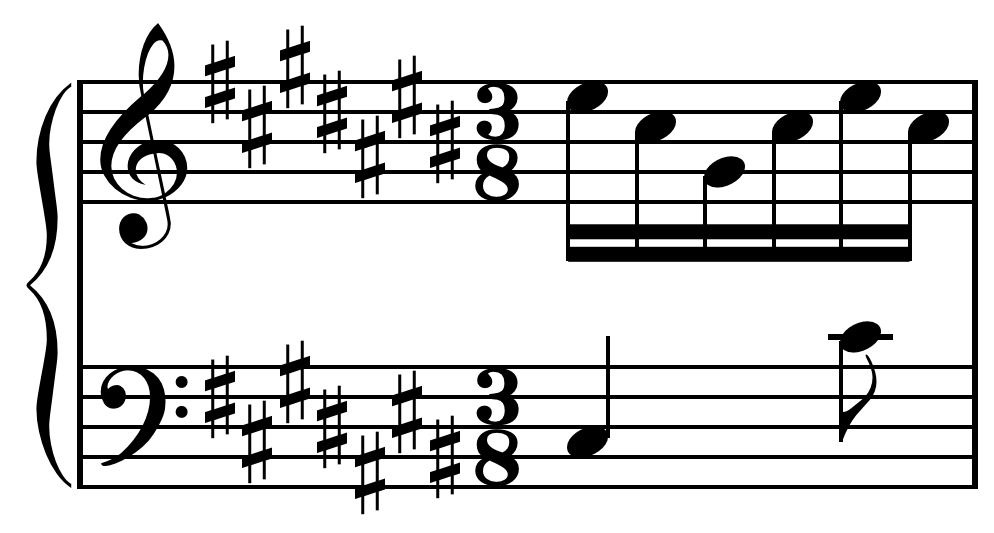
Example of an open chord spaced according to overtone series from Bach's WTC I, Prelude in C♯ Major.

In music, klang, or clang, is a term sometimes used to translate the German Klang, a highly polysemic word. Technically, the term denotes any periodic sound, especially as opposed to simple periodic sounds (sine tones). In the German lay usage, it may mean "sound" or "tone" (as synonymous to Ton), "musical tone" (as opposed to noise), "note", or "timbre"; a chord of three notes is called a Dreiklang, etc.

Klang has been used among others by Hugo Riemann and by Heinrich Schenker. In translations of their writings, it has erroneously been rendered as "chord" and more specifically as "chord of nature". The idea of the chord of nature connects with earlier ideas that can be found especially in French music theory. Both Hugo Riemann and Heinrich Schenker implicitly or explicitly refer to the theory of the chord of nature (which they recognize as a triad, a Dreiklang), but both reject the theory as a foundation of music because it fails to explain the minor triad. The theory of the chord of nature goes back to the discovery and the description of the harmonic partials (harmonic overtones) in the 17th century.

== Klang ==
The beginning of Schubert's "Meeresstille," D. 216 is an example of accompaniment in open harmony, spaced according to the overtone series

The word "klang" (or "clang") has often been used in English as a translation of the German Klang ("sound"), e.g. in the English translation of Riemann's Vereinfachte Harmonielehre. Among the few usages found in scholarly literature to denote the 'chord of nature', one may quote Ruth Solie, who speaks of "the major triad or Naturklang as found in the overtone series", or Benjamin Ayotte, who refers to an article by Oswald Jonas in 1937 which apparently makes use of the term.

The confusion by which the term has been used to denote a chord (instead of a complex sound) probably arises with Rameau's theory of Résonance. Rameau had misunderstood Joseph Sauveur's experiments, intended to demonstrate the existence of overtones, and believed that the harmonic partials arose from a resonance within the fundamental note, to which he gave the name corps sonore, often translated as Klang in German. As Henry Klumpenhouwer writes,

Almost all tonal theorists have proposed that triadic structure arises from a fundamental, conceptually anterior, constituent pitch – such as radix, son fondamental, Grundton, Hauptton – that exerts unity on the collection by means of an array of intervallic relationships sanctioned by Nature.

Klang, he adds,

is technically the German word for 'resonance' or 'sound,' although in this context [of Hauptmann's Harmonik und Metrik] it refers specifically to the ontological entities of major and minor triads, whether generated acoustically or logically.

Klang, therefore, should in most cases better be understood as "the fundamental sound", possibly "the sound of nature".

Riemann defines the Klang as "a compound sound":

The ear comprehends a tone with its direct relatives (third and fifth or their octaves) [...] as forming one compound sound, which we will call a CLANG.

He adds that

a clang may be either principal clang – in which case it is called TONIC – or derived clang [etc.].

And Schenker, although he recognizes that "the Klang as it exists in Nature is a triad", nevertheless stresses that

Nature's help to music consisted of nothing but a hint, a counsel forever mute, whose perception and interpretation were fraught with the gravest difficulties. […] This hint, then, was dropped by Nature in the form of the so-called 'overtone series.' This much-discussed phenomenon, which constitutes Nature's only source for music to draw upon, is much more familiar to the instinct of the artist than to his consciousness. […] I would recommend, however, that we conceive any so called ‘major triad' much more significantly, as a conceptual abbreviation of Nature.

And further:

Any attempt to derive even as much as the first foundation of this [minor] system, i.e., the minor triad itself, from Nature, i.e., from the overtone series, would be more than futile."

== Chord of nature ==
According to Nicholas Cook, the theory of the chord of nature is a striking manifestation of the recurrent strive, "to understand music as an ultimately physical phenomenon".

The theory appears to first have developed in French theory, culminating in Catel's Traité d'harmonie of 1802. Catel writes:

There is in harmony one chord which is the foundation of all others; this chord is formed from the produce of the sonorous body, or primitive divisions of the monochord. Supposing the sound given by the vibration of a whole string when distended, to be G, half of the string when set in vibration will give another sound G, but at the octave of the first. [Etc.: the overtones are described from the 1st to the 23d.] By beginning the progression from the fourth of the string, or from the double octave of the 1st sound, we shall find in progression of thirds the chord G, B, D, F, A. Should the experiment be began at the triple octave, that is the 8th part of the string, and the intermediary sounds be left out, the chord G, B, D, F, A♭, will be produced. […] All the chords used in natural Harmony are contained in this chord and in the foregoing. […] The other Chords introduced in Harmony are formed by the prolongation of one or several notes of a chord into the following; they go by the name of Artificial Harmony.

This became a dogma of the Paris Conservatoire: all chords that can be found in the major or minor dominant 9th are "natural", all others are "artificial". The "chord of nature" is here considered dissonant. Some theorists (including Schenker or Maurice Emmanuel) considered that overtones higher than the fifth (or sixth) could not be heard and that no dissonance could ever be justified by the harmonic series.

Maurice Emmanuel wrote

The musical language, in its foundations, is given by nature: it would seem that it should be universal and spoken in the same way by all people. If this is not so, it is due to the fact that its natural elements are more or less completely understood and used, according to the ages and the countries.

This statement has been one source of Jacques Chailley's evolutionary theory, describing music history as the progressive understanding and usage of higher overtones. The theory of the Chord of Nature was fashionable in the early 20th century. It figures prominently, for instance, in Schönberg's Harmonielehre:

A Klang is composed of a series of tones sounding simultaneously, the overtones; it therefore figures a chord.

== Sound of nature ==
The quotations above have shown the ambiguity of the word "klang", often taken to mean a "chord" but better understood as a complex or compound sound. The theory of the chord of nature does not resist examination because a chord by definition consists of several notes, each with its own overtone series. To view the overtones of a given fundamental note as a natural "model" to be imitated in art, as Schenker does, is not at all the same thing as viewing as model a chord built of several notes above the same root. The Klang, defined by Riemann as a compound sound (i.e. a note with its overtones), and the "chord of nature", defined by Schenker as a model needing "condensation" for the artistic usage are but abstract concepts.

== See also ==
- Consonance and dissonance
- Klangfarbenmelodie
- Linear progression
- Otonality and Utonality
