= Ernst Oster =

Ernst Oster (January 26, 1908 – June 30, 1977) was a German pianist, musicologist, and music theorist. A specialist in the use of Schenkerian Analysis, he was the English translator of Heinrich Schenker's final work, Free Composition.

== Life ==
Ernst Friedrich Oster was born in Mannheim, Germany. While still young, his family moved to Hamburg, where he attended the Gelehrtenschule des Johanneums. He began his musical education studying the piano; his primary piano teachers were Robert Teichmüller and Georg Bertram. In coming across Heinrich Schenker's Beethoven's Last Piano Sonatas, An Edition With Elucidation, Oster became convinced that Schenker's insight offered more than other writers on music. As the biographical note in Free Composition states:

...despite his formidable intellectual gifts and immense factual knowledge, he was convinced that musical analysis must be more than an intellectual activity, that the anaylist—like the performer—must attempt an artistic recreation of the work."

While in his 20s, Oster moved to Berlin to study with Schenker's student, Oswald Jonas. After Schenker's death in 1935, Oster moved to Vienna, where he contributed to Der Dreiklang, the short-lived periodical founded by students of Schenker, Felix Salzer and Oswald Jonas. Being Jewish, Oster emigrated to the United States after the Anschluss, but not before being entrusted with a major portion of Schenker's papers by Jeanette Schenker, Heinrich's widow. He arrived in New York City aboard the S.S. Veendam on January 14, 1939. He filed his petition for naturalization on January 29, 1945.

In the United States, Oster was active as a pianist and taught privately (Peter Serkin was one of his students), and had accompanying jobs. Later in life, he obtained teaching positions at the New England Conservatory of Music and in 1967, at the Mannes College of Music. His translation of Schenker's Free Composition, assisted by a grant from the Robert Owen Lehman Foundation, was completed in 1977. One of his students was Ross Bauer.

An avid hiker, Oster died of a stroke while hiking on Schunemunk Mountain. He was survived by a sister, Therese, who was living in Switzerland at the time of his death.

The papers of Heinrich Schenker that were in his possession were donated by his estate to the New York Public Library for the Performing Arts where they are known as the "Oster Collection: Papers of Heinrich Schenker."

== Published writings ==
- "Vom Sinn des langen Vorschlags", Der Dreiklang, 6: 140–147, 1937
  - "On the Meaning of the Long Appoggiatura", Theory and Practice, 7 (1), translated by Kosovsky, Robert: 20–37, 1982
- "The Fantaisie-Impromptu – a tribute to Beethoven", Musicology, 1 (4): 407–429, 1947
  - Reprinted in: Beach, David, ed. (1983). Aspects of Schenkerian Theory. New Haven: Yale University Press. pp. 189–207. ISBN 9780300028003.
- "The Dramatic Character of the Egmont Overture", Musicology, 2 (3): 269–285, 1949
  - Reprinted in: Beach, David, ed. (1983). Aspects of Schenkerian Theory. New Haven: Yale University Press. pp. 209–222. ISBN 9780300028003.
- Oster, Ernst (1960), "Re: A New Concept of Tonality (?)", Journal of Music Theory, 4 (1): 85–98, doi:10.2307/843052, JSTOR 843052
- Oster, Ernst (1961), "Register and the Large-Scale Connection", Journal of Music Theory, 5 (1): 54–71, doi:10.2307/842870, JSTOR 842870
- "Analysis Symposium: W. A. Mozart, Menuetto in D major for Piano (K. 355)", Journal of Music Theory, 10 (1): 32–52, 1966
- Schenker, Heinrich (1979). Free Composition (Der freie Satz. Translated by Oster, Ernst. New York: Longman. ISBN 9780028731803.
