= Martin Boykan =

American composer (1931–2021)

Martin Boykan (April 12, 1931 – March 6, 2021) was an American composer known for his chamber music as well as music for larger ensembles.

== Biography ==
Boykan was born in New York City. He studied composition first with Walter Piston at Harvard, where he received a BA in 1951. He then went to Zürich to study with Paul Hindemith, with whom he continued his studies at Yale University, earning an MM in 1953. Subsequently, he went to Vienna on a Fulbright scholarship. He also studied composition with Aaron Copland at Tanglewood (1949, 1950), and piano with Eduard Steuermann. Upon his return to the United States in 1955, he founded the Brandeis Chamber Ensemble, whose members included Robert Koff (Juilliard String Quartet), Nancy Cirillo (Wellesley), Eugene Lehner (Kolisch Quartet), and Madeline Foley (Marlboro Festival). This ensemble performed widely with a repertory divided equally between contemporary music and the tradition. At the same time Boykan appeared regularly as a pianist with soloists such as Joseph Silverstein and Jan DeGaetani. In 1964–65, he was the pianist with the Boston Symphony Orchestra under Erich Leinsdorf.

Boykan had residencies at Yaddo (1981 and 1992), the MacDowell Colony in Peterborough, New Hampshire (1982, 1989, 1992), and the Virginia Center for the Creative Arts, Amherst, Virginia (1992, 2007, 2010).

Boykan taught at Brandeis University starting in 1957, and was appointed professor there in 1976. He held the title Irving G. Fine Professor of Music. Boykan was a composer-in-residence at the Composer's Conference in Wellesley in 1987 and a visiting professor at Columbia University (1988–89) and at New York University (1993 and 2000). He was Senior Fulbright Lecturer at Bar-Ilan University, Israel (1994) and composer-in-residence at Warebrook Contemporary Music Festival, Irasburg, Vermont (1998). He served on many panels, including the Rome Prize, the Fromm Commission, the New York Council for the Arts (CAPS), and the Virginia Center for the Creative Arts. His hundreds of students include Steven Mackey, Peter Lieberson, Ross Bauer, Paul Beaudoin, Craig Walsh, and Marjorie Merryman.

Boykan's mature compositional style, beginning with the partly serial String Quartet No. 1 (1967), is marked by the influence of Anton Webern and Igor Stravinsky's late works. After the First Quartet, he began consistently to use twelve-tone technique.

Boykan wrote for a wide variety of instrumental combinations, including four string quartets, a concerto for large ensemble, many trios, duos and solo works, song cycles for voice and piano, voice and other instruments, and choral music. The Utah Symphony premiered his symphony for orchestra and baritone solo in 1993 and the Boston Modern Orchestra Project premiered his Concerto for Violin in 2009. His work is widely performed and has been presented by ensembles including the Boston Symphony Chamber Players, the New York New Music Ensemble, Speculum Musicae, the League-ISCM, Earplay, Musica Viva and Collage New Music.

Boykan received the Jeunesse musicales award for his String Quartet No. 1 in 1967, and the League-ISCM award for Elegy in 1982. Other awards include a Rockefeller grant (1974), NEA award (1983), Guggenheim Fellowship (1984), two Fulbrights (1953–55), as well as a recording award and the Walter Hinrichsen Publication Award from the American Academy (1988) and National Institute of Arts and Letters (1986). In 1994 he was awarded a Senior Fulbright to Israel. He received numerous commissions from chamber ensembles, the Koussevitsky Foundation in the Library of Congress (1985), and the Fromm Foundation (1976).

== Personal life ==
Boykan was the son of New York dentist Joseph Boykan and his wife Matilda, and the brother of mathematical logician Marian Pour-El. He married the silverpoint artist Susan Schwalb in 1983. Boykan died at his home on March 6, 2021, aged 89.

== Selected works and publications ==
- String Trio (1948)
- String Quartet (1949)
- Flute Sonata (1950)
- Duo for Violin and Piano (1951)
- Flute Quintet (1953)
- By the Waters of Babylon, prelude for organ (1964)
- Psalm 128 for a cappella chorus (1965)
- String Quartet No. 1 (1967), recorded by CRI
- Concerto for 13 players (1971), APNM
- String Quartet No. 2 (1974), recorded by CRI
- Trio for violin, cello and piano (1975), commissioned by the Fromm Foundation
- Elegy for soprano and six Instruments, on texts by Goethe, Leopari, Wngaretti, Emily Dickinson, and Li Ho (1982), recorded by CRI
- String Quartet No. 3 (1984)
- Shalom Rav' for baritone, chorus and organ (1985)
- Piano Sonata No. 1 (1986)
- Epithalamion for baritone, violin and harp (1987), recorded by CRI
- Symphony for orchestra with baritone solo (1989), commissioned by the Koussevitzky Foundation
- Piano Sonata No. 2 (1990)
- Nocturne for Cello, Piano and Percussion (1991)
- Eclogue, for flute, horn, viola, cello and piano (1991)
- Echoes of Petrarch for flute, clarinet and piano (1992), recorded by CRI
- Sonata for cello and piano (1992)
- Voyages for soprano and piano, on texts by Hart Crane (1992)
- Sea Gardens, four songs for soprano and piano, on texts by Hart Crane, Whitman, and Shakespeare (1993)
- Impromptu for violin solo (1993)
- Three Psalms for soprano and piano (1993)
- Pastorale for piano (1993)
- Sonata for Violin and Piano (1994) C.F. Peters
- Ma'ariv Settings for chorus and organ (1995)
- String Quartet No. 4 (1995–96), recorded by CRI
- Three Shakespeare Songs for chorus (1996)
- City of Gold (1996), recorded by CRI
- Trio No. 2 for violin, cello and piano (1997) recorded for CRI
- Psalm 121 for Soprano and String Quartet (1997)
- Usurpations, five bagatelles for piano (1997)
- Sonata for solo violin (1998)
- Flume for clarinet and piano (1998)
- Romanza for flute and piano (1999)
- A Packet for Susan, five songs for mezzo-soprano and piano on texts by Keats, Donne, Landor and Lear (2000)
- Motet for mezzo-soprano and consort of viols (2001)
- Songlines for flute, clarinet, violin and ‘cello (2001)
- Concerto for violin and piano (2004)
- Second Chances (2005), song cycle on texts by Mary Oliver for mezzo-soprano and piano, premiere performances in New York (Jan. 2006) and Boston (Feb. 2006).
- Piano Trio No. 3, “Rites of Passage” (2006)
- Piano Sonata No. 3 (2007)
- Toward the Horizon, Novella, for piano solo (2008)
- Soliloquies of an Insomniac, four songs for soprano and piano (2008)
- Sonata No. 2 for violin and piano (2009)
- "As Once on a Deserted Street..." (2010) for quintet (piano, violin, clarinet, horn, cello)

== Recordings ==
The String Quartets Nos. 1 and 2 are recorded on CRI. A disc of vocal music (Elegy and Epithalamion) was released by CRI in 1998, along with the String Quartet No. 4. A second CD including the Piano Trio No. 2, Echoes of Petrarch (trio for flute, clarinet and piano), City of Gold (flute) and the Second Quartet was released in January 2000. Another CD of chamber works issued by CRI (now assigned to New World Records) includes a violin sonata, Flume for clarinet and piano, a song cycle (A Packet for Susan), and the First String Quartet. Sonata for Solo Violin (commissioned by Dan Stepner) is included on a CD by the violinist Curt Macomber (also CRI/New World).

In 2010 Albany Records released the CD Second Chances, which includes String Quartet No. 3, Motet, Songlines and Second Chances featuring mezzo-soprano Pamela Dellal and pianist Donald Berman. Scores are published by Mobart Music Press and C.F. Peters.

In 2004 Scarecrow Press, Maryland, published Boykan's collection of essays Silence and Slow-Time: Studies in Musical Narrative. Pendragon Press published his second book, The Power of the Moment: Essays on the Western Musical Canon, in 2011. Three artist books produced in collaboration with his wife, the artist Susan Schwalb, were purchased by the Music Division of the Library of Congress: City of Gold (flute solo), Flume (clarinet), and Nocturne (viola da gamba).
