= Carol Prusa =

American visual artist (born 1956)

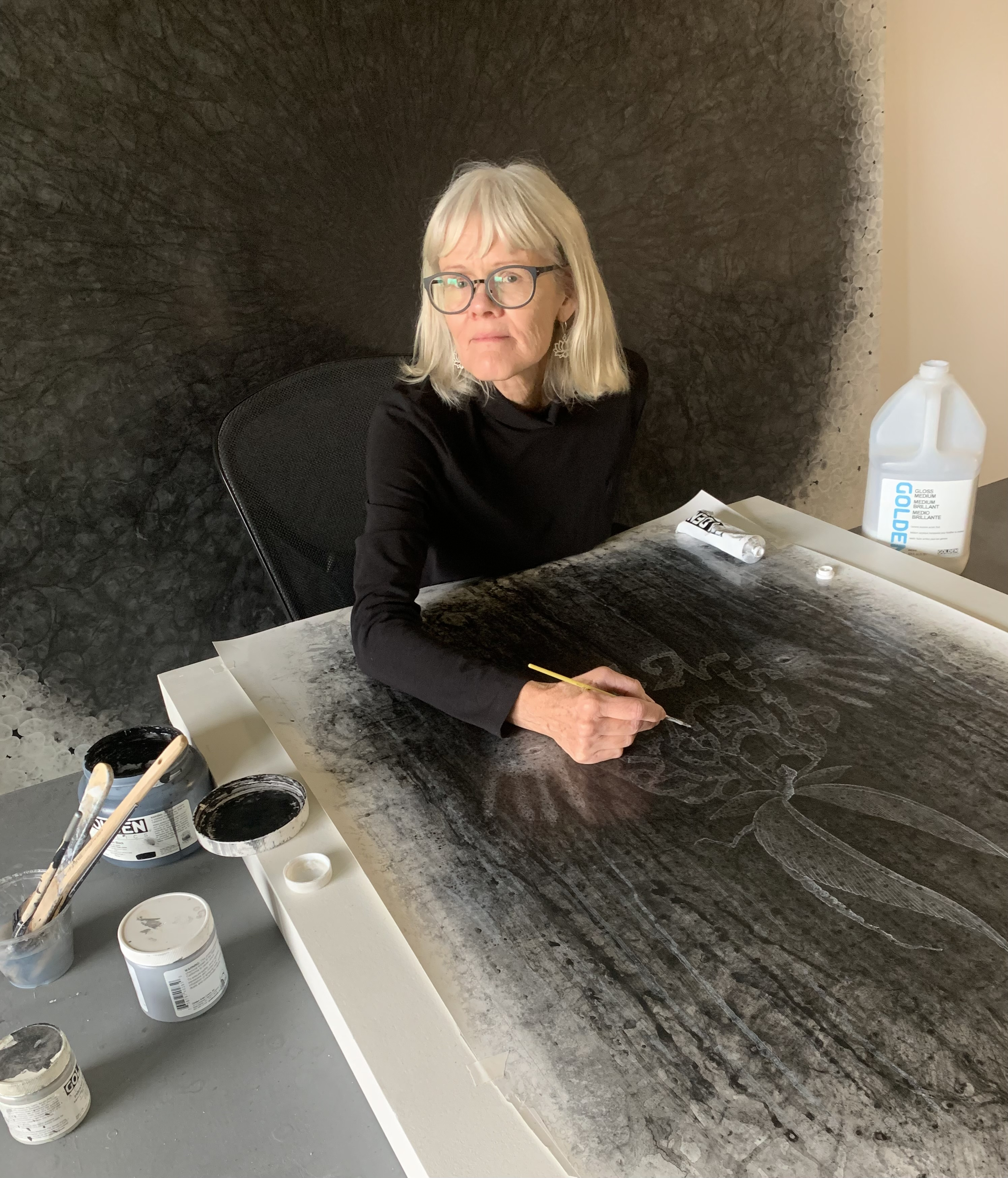
- Born: October 8, 1956 (age 69); Chicago, Illinois
- Education: University of Illinois; Drake University
- Occupation: Visual Artist
- Website: https://carolprusa.com/

Carol Prusa (born in Chicago, 1956) is a contemporary American visual artist known for her rigorous large scale silverpoint technique and use of unexpected materials from sculpted fiberglass to LED lights and her focus on astrophysics. In the 2015 catalogue essay for the National Gallery of Art exhibition Drawing in Silver and Gold: Leonardo to Jasper Johns, Bruce Weber called Carol Prusa “one of the most innovative artists working in metalpoint today.” In 2024, she was nominated for the 2024 Florida Prize in Contemporary Art from the Orlando Museum of Art.

== Early life and education ==
Carol Prusa was a science student when she decided to take drawing classes. She received her BS in medical illustration from the University of Illinois. She later went to pursue an MFA in Painting and Drawing from Drake University.

After graduation, Prusa took an assistant art professor position at Iowa State University in 1986, and spent eighteen years working at this institution. She moved to South Florida in 1999 for a tenure track position at Florida Atlantic University.

== Work ==
Carol Prusa's work delves into scientific disciplines such as astrophysics and mathematics to comment on human relations and interactions. Her artistic production involves painting, drawing, sculpture, performance, fiberglass, and silverpoint technics.

In 2020, she presented the solo exhibition Carol Prusa: Dark Light at Boca Raton Museum of Art, about her ongoing interest in the space, the universe and cosmic events such as eclipses and other stellar phenomena manifested through two dimensional and sculptural objects. In 2018, the solo show Dark Energy, was on view at Endicott College, Massachusetts, about the artist's interest in the 2017 eclipse.

In 2009, the one-person show Silver Linings: Delicate Drawings by Carol Prusa, took place at Polk Art Museum at Florida Southern College, an affiliate of the Smithsonian. In 2007, the Museum of Contemporary Art Jacksonville presented Coherent Structures: Recent Silverpoint Paintings by Carol Prusa. The York College of Pennsylvania presented the two person exhibition Andi Steele and Carol Prusa at York College Gallery in 2007.

== Artworks in collections (selection) ==
- Pérez Art Museum Miami, Florida
- Museum of Arts and Design, New York
- Telfair Museums, Savannah
- Museum of Arts and Sciences, Georgia
- Orlando Museum of Art, Florida
- Art in Embassies Program
- Hunter Museum of American Art
- University of Wyoming Art Museum, Spencer Museum of Art (University of Kansas)
- University of Florida Public Art
- Daum Museum of Contemporary Art
- Arkansas Museum of Fine Arts, Arkansas
- Agnes Gund
- Time Equities Inc.
- Hunter Museum of American Art, Chattanooga
- Museum of Art Fort Lauderdale, Florida

== Awards and recognition ==
Prusa won prestigious awards and receive support for several artist-in-residence programs such as the Brown University Foundation Fellowship and the Kohler Artist in Industry residence at John Michael Kohler Arts Center.
