= Ross Bauer =

American composer and conductor, professor emeritus at University of California, Davis

- Born: December 19, 1951 (age 74); Ithaca, New York, U.S.
- Education: New England Conservatory; Brandeis University
- Occupations: Composer, conductor, music educator
- Known for: Contemporary classical music, music education
- Title: Professor Emeritus, University of California, Davis
- Awards: Walter Hinrichsen Award (2005); Guggenheim Fellowship (1988); ISCM National Composers Competition (1989); Speculum Musicae International Composers’ Competition (1997)

Ross Bauer (born December 19, 1951, Ithaca, New York) is an American composer, conductor, and music educator. A professor emeritus of the University of California, Davis, he was awarded the Walter Hinrichsen Award from the American Academy of Arts and Letters in 2005.

== Life and career ==
Born in Ithaca, New York, Bauer graduated from the New England Conservatory in 1975 with a Bachelor of Music degree. At the NEC he was a pupil of John Heiss and Ernst Oster. He studied music composition with Luciano Berio while a fellow at the Tanglewood Music Center in 1982. In 1984 he earned a PhD from Brandeis University where he studied with Arthur Berger, Martin Boykan, and Seymour Shifrin. In 1986 he was awarded a fellowship from the National Endowment for the Arts and in 1988 he was the recipient of a Guggenheim Fellowship. In 1996 he was a fellow at the MacDowell Colony.

As a music educator, Bauer taught on the music faculties of Brandeis University (1981–1985), Stanford University (1986–1988), and the University of California, Davis (1988–2017). Upon his retirement from the latter institution in 2017, he was named a professor emeritus. At Brandeis he was the director of the Brandéis Jazz Ensemble, and at Stanford he directed the Alea II New Music Ensemble. He founded the Empyrean Ensemble at the University of California, Davis; an ensemble he directed during his tenure at that university.

As a composer, Bauer won the ISCM National Composers Competition in 1989 and the Speculum Musicae International Composers’ Competition in 1997. He received commissions from the Fromm Music Foundation in 1991 and the Koussevitzky Music Foundation in 1994. In 2005 he was awarded the Walter Hinrichsen Award from the American Academy of Arts and Letters.

== Partial list of works ==
=== Orchestral ===
- Concertino for Chamber Orchestra (1983)
- Sospeso for Strings (1987)
- Neon (1988)
- Piano Concerto (1990)
- Halcyon Birds for Chamber Orchestra (1993)
- Romanza for violin and orchestra (1996)
- Icons, bassoon concerto (1997)

=== Chamber music ===
- Trio for clarinet, cello and piano (1980)
- String quartet no. 1 (1981)
- Hang Time for clarinet, violin, and piano (1984)
- Along the Way for 10 Players (1985)
- Deja Vu for flute, clarinet, violin, cello, and piano (1986)
- Evanescent Heterophony for cello and piano (1986)
- Chimera for 9 Players (1987)
- String quartet no. 2 (1987)
- Fast Gar Nichts... for string trio (1988)
- Chin Music for viola and piano (1989)
- Anaphora for flute, violin, viola, cello, and piano (1991)
- Tributaries for cello, percussion, and piano (1992)
- Aplomb for violin and piano (1993)
- Octet for clarinet, bassoon, horn, string Quartet, and bass (1994)
- Stone Soup for flute, clarinet, violin, cello, and piano (1995)
- Motion for piano trio (1998)
- Pulse for clarinet, viola, and piano (1999)
- Etudes for Violin (1999)
- String quartet no. 3 (2000)

=== Piano ===
- Tonarten (1982)
- Birthday Bagatelles (1993)

=== Vocal music ===
- Four Honig Songs for Soprano and Piano (1989)
- Oda al Olor de la Lena for Baritone, Alto Flute, Cello, and Percussion, after Neruda (1991)
- Ritual Fragments for Soprano, Flute, Clarinet, Violin, Cello, Percussion, and Piano, after Native American texts (1995)
- Eskimo Songs for mezzo-soprano, flute, cello, and piano (1996)
