= Sylvan Kalib =

American singer (1929–2025)

Sylvan Sholom Kalib
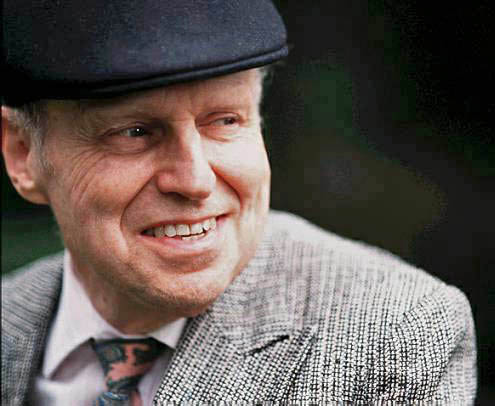
- Born: July 24, 1929; Dallas, Texas, U.S.
- Died: January 15, 2025 (aged 95)
- Occupations: Music Theorist, Musicologist
- Notable work: The Musical Tradition of The Eastern European Synagogue

Sylvan Sholom Kalib (July 24, 1929 – January 15, 2025) was an American music theorist, musicologist, cantor, conductor, pedagogue and composer. His primary work falls broadly into two categories: 1) Schenkerian music theory and 2) the musical tradition of the Eastern European synagogue.

== Biography ==
=== Early years ===
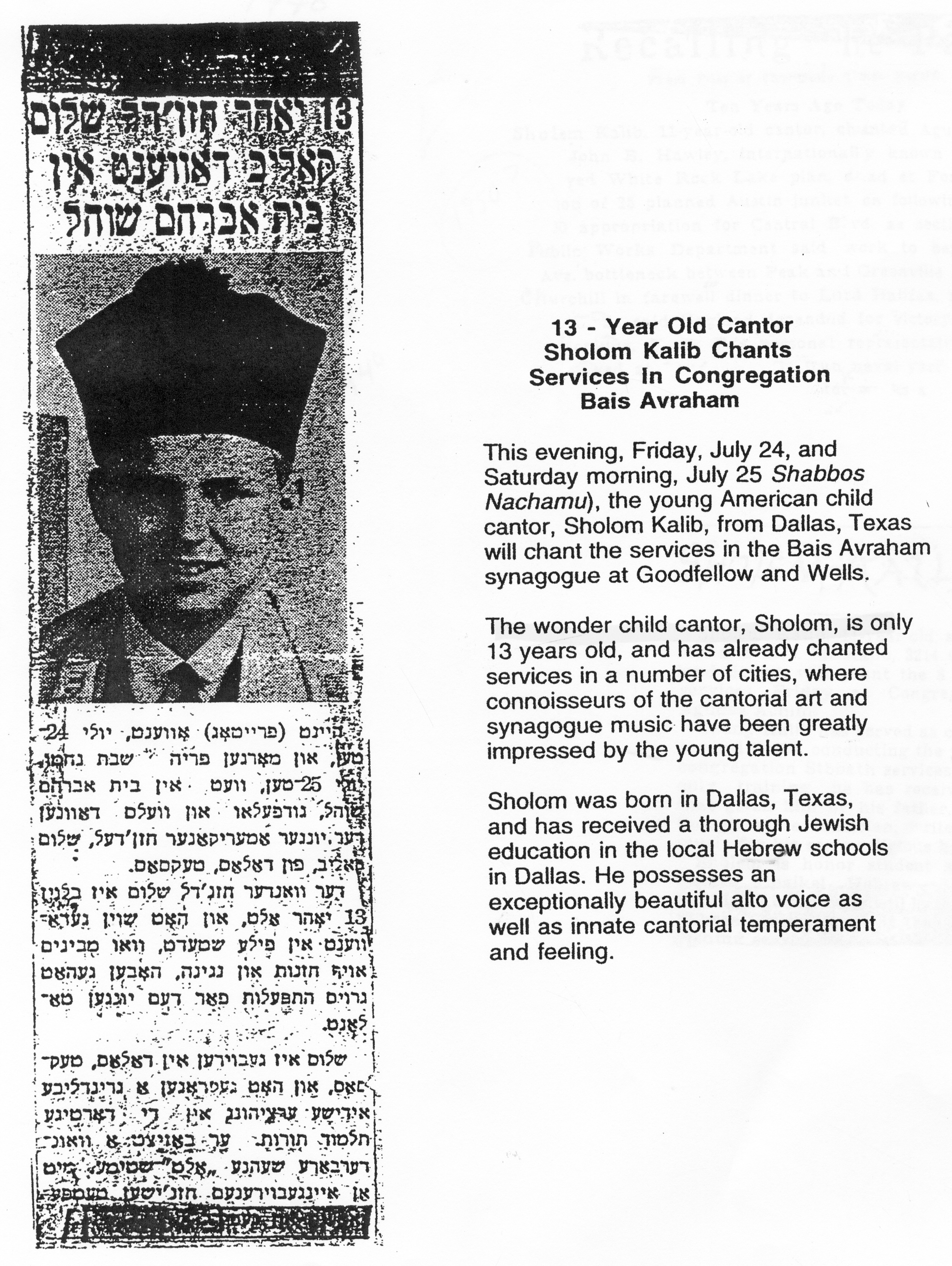
Child Hazzan Sholom Kalib, circa 1942

Kalib's parents were immigrants from Ukraine who met and married in Dallas, Texas. His father was a furniture finisher by trade who acquired notable musical skill during his youth in Russia through exposure to his brother's cantorial training. Consequently, Kalib's first musical training was with his father. From him, Kalib acquired not only a solid foundation in rudimentary musicianship but also in the traditions and sanctity of the Eastern European synagogue. Thus, during his youth in Dallas, he mastered the skills of music notation and solfeggio, learned to chant from the Torah, and functioned as a child chazzan. This duality of music theory and music of the synagogue proved to be the core of Kalib's life and work.

Kalib's family moved to Chicago in the summer of 1942 where Sylvan enrolled at the Chicago Jewish Academy. The following year, at age fourteen, he was appointed choir leader for Cantor Abraham Kipper, officiary of Jewish High Holidays at the Chicago Rumanian Synagogue, Shaarei Shamayim. Kalib commenced formal study of Western art music at newly founded Roosevelt University in 1946, where he became the protégé of the eminent Austrian music theorist, and first-generation scholar of Heinrich Schenker, Oswald Jonas. As a result, Kalib's art-music aesthetic and chief academic pursuits largely were shaped by the principles and philosophy of Schenkerian theory. Following formal apprenticeship, Jonas remained Kalib's informal mentor and guided him in determination of his Ph.D. dissertation topic. Jonas suggested Kalib cover essays from Schenker's three yearbooks, Das Meisterwerk in der Musik, and procured copies of the out-of-print volumes, selected the essays he considered most vital and—as neither Schenker nor his wife were alive at the time—garnered permission for Kalib to translate and annotate the essays from Professor Erwin Ratz of Vienna (a nephew of Schenker's widow who inherited the rights to Schenker's works).

Kalib led various synagogue choirs in the Chicago area between ages fourteen and eighteen before assuming his first cantorial post, at age nineteen, in 1949. The following year, and throughout the 1950s, he was under the employ of the Jewish Music Institute of the College of Jewish Studies (now the Spertus Institute of Jewish Studies) as instructor of nusach and chazzanut (cantorial art). During this period and beyond, Kalib worked closely with Cantors Todros Greenberg and Joshua Lind, both preeminent cantors of Chicago at that time. From them, Kalib gained further invaluable experience and informal instruction in traditional cantorial as well as synagogue choral repertoire and art. Kalib reciprocated by notating from dictation the entire creative output of Cantor Greenberg, a process which Kalib began at thirteen and continued until Greenberg's death in 1976, and which ultimately resulted in publication of Greenberg's complete works. Similarly, Kalib edited, and prepared for publication, two volumes of works by Cantor Joshua Lind. Kalib gradually acquired a national reputation for exceptionally fine musical arrangements and accompaniments and for his skill in transcribing Ashkenazic cantorial chant as evidenced in the Greenberg and Lind volumes. He was elected conductor of the choral ensemble of The Cantors’ Association of Chicago in 1953, an ensemble consisting of twenty-five of Chicago's preeminent cantors.

=== Middle years ===
Kalib married Goldie Szachter (a Holocaust survivor) in 1954 and had two daughters: Ruth and Vivian. He completed the master's degree in music theory at DePaul University in 1962 with a thesis entitled The Hindemith System: A Critique, and worked as a cantor, choral director and teacher of general music in the Chicago public school system from 1960 to 1969. In 1966, Kalib began the Ph.D. in music theory at Northwestern University, where he introduced Schenkerian analysis to the faculty (and was, incidentally, classmate to Joseph Schwantner, Thom David Mason and Harold Wiesner). Kalib's doctoral dissertation, Thirteen Essays from “Das Meisterwerk in der Musik” by Heinrich Schenker: An Annotated Translation, Volumes I–III (1969–73), was the first translation of Schenker's Yearbooks into English and rapidly became a pillar of English-language scholarship in Schenkerian theory. In a letter to Kalib, Milton Babbitt declared the work to be “referentially clearer than the original,” and it remains among the most effective and important digests in explanation of Schenker's highly complex “prolongational” procedures, “Chord of Nature,” and general views regarding musical analysis and various disciplines of music. Kalib's work was used widely as a textbook for advanced music theory coursework during the 1970s, ’80s and early ’90s—specifically at Columbia, Harvard, Yale and Purdue Universities, and correspondence among prominent academicians of the time illustrates unanimous deference for his expertise and scholarship:

“I continue to find it [your work] useful and interesting. Only recently have I become aware of certain of your analyses that I had hitherto overlooked. I think especially of those for the Chopin D Flat Major Nocturne, Bach’s G Minor Fugue (WTC I) and Beethoven’s Tempest Sonata. These are quite impressive, and I plan to study them more.”
—Charles Burkhart to Sylvan Kalib, March 27, 1983

Urlinie-Graph Analysis (Schenkerian Analysis) by Sylvan (Sholom) Kalib of Johannes Brahms’s Intermezzo, Opus 119, no. 3

Despite rapidly increasing enthusiasm for Schenker theory in American musical academe during the 1960s, ’70s and ’80s—and pending standardization of Schenkerian analysis into the canon of American graduate music theory—Schenker’s highly original theories and analytical techniques were not yet mainstream at the onset of Kalib’s academic career. In fact, as mentioned earlier, it was Kalib who introduced Schenker theory to the faculty of Northwestern University. Later, as “Professor of Music Theory and Literature” at Eastern Michigan University (1969–1999), under the auspice of “independent studies,” a number of students received advanced private instruction from Kalib in Schenker theory, harmony and counterpoint, and toward the close of his thirty-year professorial career, he taught a course specifically slated to offer all E.M.U. graduate music students the benefit of his specialty.

A fortuitous academic consequence of Kalib's mastery was the exceptional commitment to in-depth training in fundamental areas of music theory within the overall comprehensive approach to the subject at Eastern Michigan University during his tenure. These areas included ear-training, figured bass, voice leading, harmony and counterpoint—disciplines that have, to a significant extent, become relegated to the “pedagogy of music theory” in contemporary academic musical parlance. Kalib's choral works include a concert High Holy Day Service, The Days of Awe, and a similar concert work for the Sabbath, The Day of Rest, both for cantor, children's choir and orchestra. Six selections from the latter work were recorded by the Vienna Boys’ Choir in 2001 as part of the Milken Archive of American Jewish Music featuring the preeminent cantor of the Great Synagogue in Jerusalem, Naftali Hershtik.

Coinciding with the period of his career in academe, Kalib noted that whereas scholarly interest in Schenkerian theory had grown widespread, in-depth, scholarly documentation of significant areas of the traditional synagogue music of his youth remained unaddressed. Kalib's primary research and scholarly pursuits, therefore, gradually returned to his lifelong passion for the traditional art music of the synagogue. While maintaining cantorial posts in Detroit and Flint during his professorial career, and throughout formal sabbaticals, Kalib undertook musicological research in major Jewish communities in North America and Israel, recording and archiving fading historic cantorial tradition and repertoire in one-hundred-and-twenty taped interviews with forty Eastern European professional and lay cantors.

=== Later years ===
Kalib formally retired as “Professor Emeritus” from Eastern Michigan University in 1999. In “retirement,” and with renewed resolve, vigor and focus, Kalib resumed work on his landmark musicological tome, The Musical Tradition of The Eastern European Synagogue: a projected five-volume, twenty-book treatise on Eastern European Ashkenazic liturgical music history, repertoire and tradition. Volumes I and II, History and Definition and The Weekday Services, were published by Syracuse University Press in 2002 and 2005 respectively and are lauded by musicologists and ethnomusicologists as definitive texts unprecedented in both scope and focus. Volume III, The Sabbath Services, came out in two parts: IIIA, the Friday Evening Services, in 2017, and IIIB, The Sabbath Day Services, in 2023.

In partnership with his daughter, Ruth Eisenberg, Kalib created the Jewish Music Heritage Project in support of The Musical Tradition of The Eastern European Synagogue (2005). They also formed a corresponding volunteer choir (conducted by Kalib) to record an exhaustive audio archive as companion to the literary work. The choir produced an Inaugural Season compact disc—the first in a set of seventy-five planned recordings—but archival recording ceased in 2007 due to insufficient funds and musical resources.

Kalib died on January 15, 2025, at the age of 95.

== Publications and salient works ==
- Hechal Han’gina V’hat’fila, Vol. I, Liturgical and Yiddish Selections, for cantor and piano by Todros Greenberg; compiled, arranged and edited by Sholom (Sylvan) Kalib. The Cantor's Assembly, Midwest Region, Chicago, IL, 1961.
- The Hindemith System: A Critique. Master's Thesis in music theory, DePaul University; Chicago, IL, 1962.
- An Anthology of Hazzanic Recitatives for Sabbath and Festivals, by Joshua Lind; compiled, arranged and edited by Sholom (Sylvan) Kalib. The Cantor's Assembly, New York, NY, 1965
- Review of Der Musik der Bibel (Schwann AMS 8), The Journal of The Society for Ethnomusicology, Vol. XIII, no. 3, September 1969: pgs. 584–586.
- N’ginot Todros, Vol. II, Friday Evening Choral Compositions, by Todros Greenberg; compiled, arranged and edited by Sholom (Sylvan) Kalib. The Cantor's Assembly, Midwest Region, Chicago, IL, 1970.
- Thirteen Essays from The Three Yearbooks “Das Meisterwerk in Der Musik,” by Heinrich Schenker: An Annotated Translation. (Vol.’s I–III). Ph.D. diss., Northwestern University, 1973.
- Rinat Yehoshua: The Complete High Holy Day Service for Hazzan, by Joshua Lind; compiled, arranged and edited by Sholom (Sylvan) Kalib. The Cantor’s Assembly, New York, NY, 1974.
- Rejoice and Sing. Chassidic melodies for three-part youth chorus arranged by Sholom (Sylvan) Kalib, commissioned by the Beth Abraham Youth Chorale, Dayton, OH. Tara Publications, New York, NY, 1975.
- The Days of Awe. Concert service for the High Holiday liturgy, for cantor, children’s choir and orchestra. Dayton Ohio, 1976.
- Seven selections from The Days of Awe. The Cantor’s Assembly, New York, NY, 1977.
- N’ginot Todros, Vol. IV, High Holiday Services, for cantor and choir, by Todros Greenberg; compiled, arranged and edited by Sholom (Sylvan) Kalib. The Cantor’s Assembly, New York, NY, 1978.
- The Day of Rest. Concert service for the Sabbath liturgy, for cantor, children’s choir, and orchestra. Dayton Ohio, 1978.
- Hechal Han’gina V’hat’fila, Vol. II, Sabbath and Festival Services, for cantor, by Todros Greenberg; compiled, arranged and edited by Sholom (Sylvan) Kalib. The Cantor’s Assembly, Midwest Region, Chicago, IL, 1983.
- The Lord is My Shepherd. Setting for four-part a capella chorus, Mark Foster Music Company, Champaign, Illinois, 1988.
- Analysis: Anthony Iannaccone’s “Apparitions.” Journal of Band Research, Vol. 25, no. I; fall 1989: pgs. 2–64.
- The Last Selection: A Child's Journey Through the Holocaust. Goldie Szachter Kalib, Sylvan (Sholom) Kalib and Ken Wachsberger. The University of Massachusetts Press, Amherst, 1991. ISBN 1-55849-018-3.
- A Jewish Celebration in Song. Vienna Boy’s Choir, music by Sholom (Sylvan) Kalib and Abraham Kaplan. Nineteen-track sound recording, Naxos, Milken Archive of American Jewish Music. Vienna, Austria, 2001. Naxos Catalogue no. 8.559419. Work Category: Choral-Sacred.
- The Musical Tradition of The Eastern European Synagogue, Volume I, Introduction: History and Definition. Syracuse University Press, 2002. ISBN 0-8156-2966-4 part one, text; ISBN 0-8156-2986-9 part two, music.
- The Musical Tradition of The Eastern European Synagogue, Volume II, The Weekday Services (covering the Weekday Daily, Minor Holiday and Life-cycle-event services). Syracuse University Press, 2005. ISBN 0-8156-3077-8.
- Great Synagogue Masterpieces: The Day of Rest and The Days of Awe. 4 CD Set. Tara Publications, 2005.
- The Inaugural Season. Eighteen-track sound recording by the Jewish Musical Heritage Project Boy’s and Men’s Choir. Sholom (Sylvan) Kalib, conductor. JMHP, Baltimore, MD, 2006.
