= Self-Portrait at the Age of 13 =

1484 drawing by Albrecht Dürer

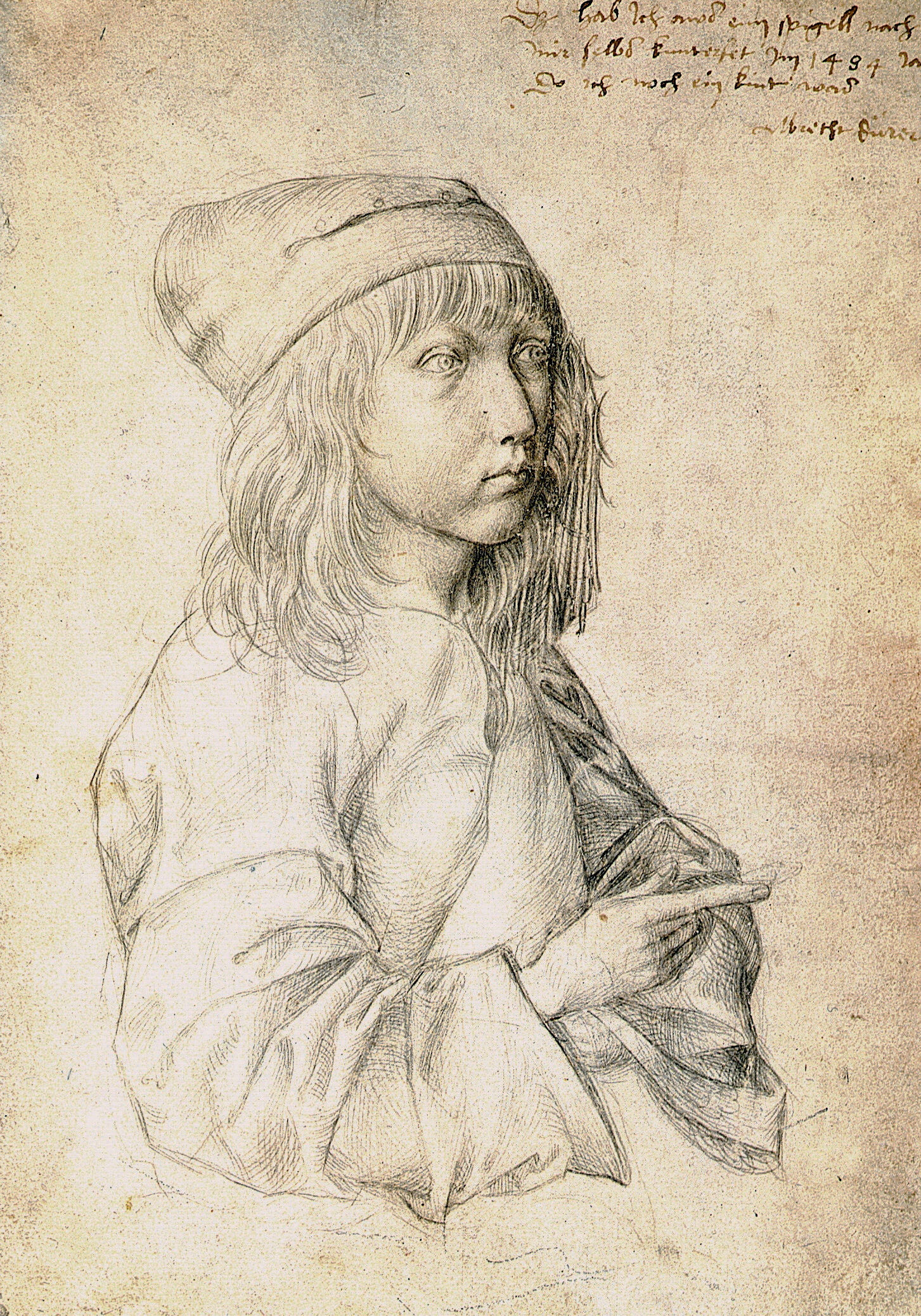
Albrecht Dürer's 1484 self-portrait. Albertina, Vienna, 27.5 x 19.6 cm

Self-Portrait at the age of 13 (the title is modern) is a silverpoint drawing by Albrecht Dürer, dated 1484, when the artist was either twelve or thirteen years of age. It is now in the Albertina museum, Vienna, where it arrived, via the collections of the Imhoff family in Nuremberg and the Habsburg collections, from Dürer's own literary and remains. It is the artist's oldest known surviving drawing, one of the oldest extant self-portraits in European art, and one of the earliest child's drawings, as well. It was completed two years before Albrecht left his father's apprenticeship to study under Michael Wolgemut, whom (some modern authors speculate) he quickly realised was a valuable mentor but whom the younger man may have recognized was unequal to himself in his abilities.

Throughout his life Dürer expressed resolute self-confidence. He celebrated himself in his drawings and writings. His four known self-portraits were all completed before he entered his 30s, and so they predate his mature period. As with the other three self-portraits, which are oil paintings, this work can be interpreted as having recorded Dürer's awareness of, and confidence in, his great-yet-still-developing artistic powers. This tone is especially evident in the subject's precocious countenance. Dürer presents himself in half-length and in side view, in a pose closely resembling the one seen in a surviving portrait attributed to his father, also Albrecht, who was a goldsmith by profession.

The artist's right arm is raised, while his index finger boldly points to an unidentified area outside the picture’s frame. Dürer presents himself in a flattering light: he has long hair, he has the pleasing appearance of a fresh-faced boy, and he has elegant and elongated fingers (at the time, this was a characteristic both fashionable and seen to indicate draftsman skills). Dürer wrote in the 1520s that even his simple sketches expressed "the spiritual essence of an artist's creative impulse"—since a talented artist could express more in a simple line-drawing than a mediocre artist could express in a year of painting. By the time he made this statement, the artist was looking back at his production, including early works like the silverpoint self-portrait that had been made before he entered formal training as an artist under Wolgemut. From this retrospective point of view, the drawing becomes proof of Dürer's inborn genius, though at the time of its creation it had a quite different purpose. That it was preserved, however, proves that Dürer's family, most likely his father, saw fit to collect his son's output.

It has been speculated on the basis of Dürer's Family Chronicle that the self-portrait might have been set as a task by Albrecht the Elder as a challenge for his son. It was signed at some unknown later date (probably in the 1520s) with the words "This I drew myself from a mirror in the year 1484, when I was still a child. Albrecht Dürer". Dürer was born in May 1471, and he himself did not title the work--nor did he title most of his works; given that it was completed in 1484, it is almost equally likely Dürer had created it when he was 12 years old, even though the self-portrait is sometimes known by the invented title "at the age of 13"

== See also ==
- List of paintings by Albrecht Dürer

== Bibliography ==
- Bieler, Stacey. Albrecht Durer: Artist in the Midst of Two Storms. Cascade Books, 2017. ISBN 978-1-5326-1965-6
- Brion, Marcel. Dürer. London: Thames and Hudson, 1960
- Joseph Koerner. The Moment of Self-Portraiture in German Renaissance art. Chicago: University of Chicago Press, 1993.
- Hall, James. The Self-portrait: A Cultural History. London: Thames & Hudson, 2014. ISBN 978-0-5002-3910-0
- Porcu, Costantino (ed). Dürer. Rizzoli, Milano 2004
- Chipps Smith, Jeffrey; Silver, Larry (eds). The Essential Durer. University of Pennsylvania, 2011. ISBN 978-0-8122-2178-7
