= Jeannine Cook =

American metalpoint artist

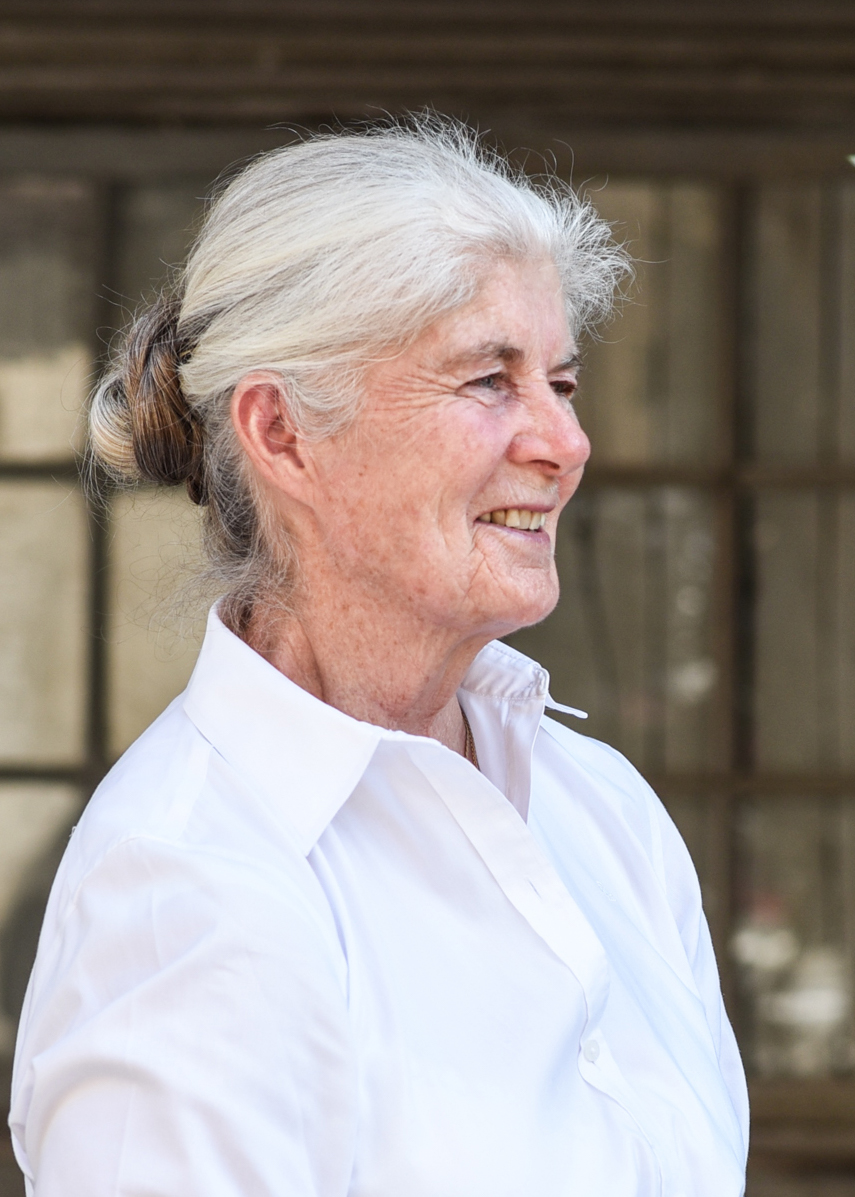
Portrait of the artist Jeannine Cook

Jeannine Cook (born in 1944), is a contemporary metalpoint artist who works from her studio in Palma de Mallorca, Spain, after living in the United States. Encouraged to concentrate on art rather than languages and freelance journalism by Jeanne Nelson Szabo, a former Professor of Art at University of California Los Angeles, Cook initially exhibited watercolours in Westchester, New York, and elsewhere in New York from 1979 onwards.

Cook was quickly accepted for membership in artists’ organisations such as the Mamaroneck Artists Guild, Catharine Lorillard Wolfe Artists Club, New York, and the American Artists Professional League, New York, with which she often exhibited. She was subsequently selected for membership in the National Association of Women Artists, The Pen & Brush in New York, and Women's Caucus for Art, as well as being a Signature Member of the Georgia Watercolor Society.

In 1983, Cook moved with her husband to coastal Georgia, where the couple spent two years building a post-and-beam house bordering on salt water marshes. During this period, she set aside her art practice. When she returned to art, she began to draw in metalpoint, a medium little known amongst both artists and the general public. Soon Cook was exhibiting in solo shows in local museums and galleries in Georgia and beyond, and her drawings and watercolours began to enter numerous museum and private collections. Her work was acquired by the Georgia Art Acquisition Program for Gainesville College in 1986. In 2003, she was awarded a public art commission from the Fulton County Arts Council, Atlanta, Georgia. By 2011, Cook was increasingly specialising in drawing and painting far less in watercolours.

Cook's drawing practice has continued both in the United States and Europe, with frequent solo and group exhibitions on both continents. Her work is now represented in such museums as the British Museum, the Victoria & Albert Museum, the Whitworth, Manchester UK, the Museum of Fine Arts Houston in Texas, the Museo de Bellas Artes de Bilbao (Spain) and BAMPFA, in Berkeley, California, among many others around the world.

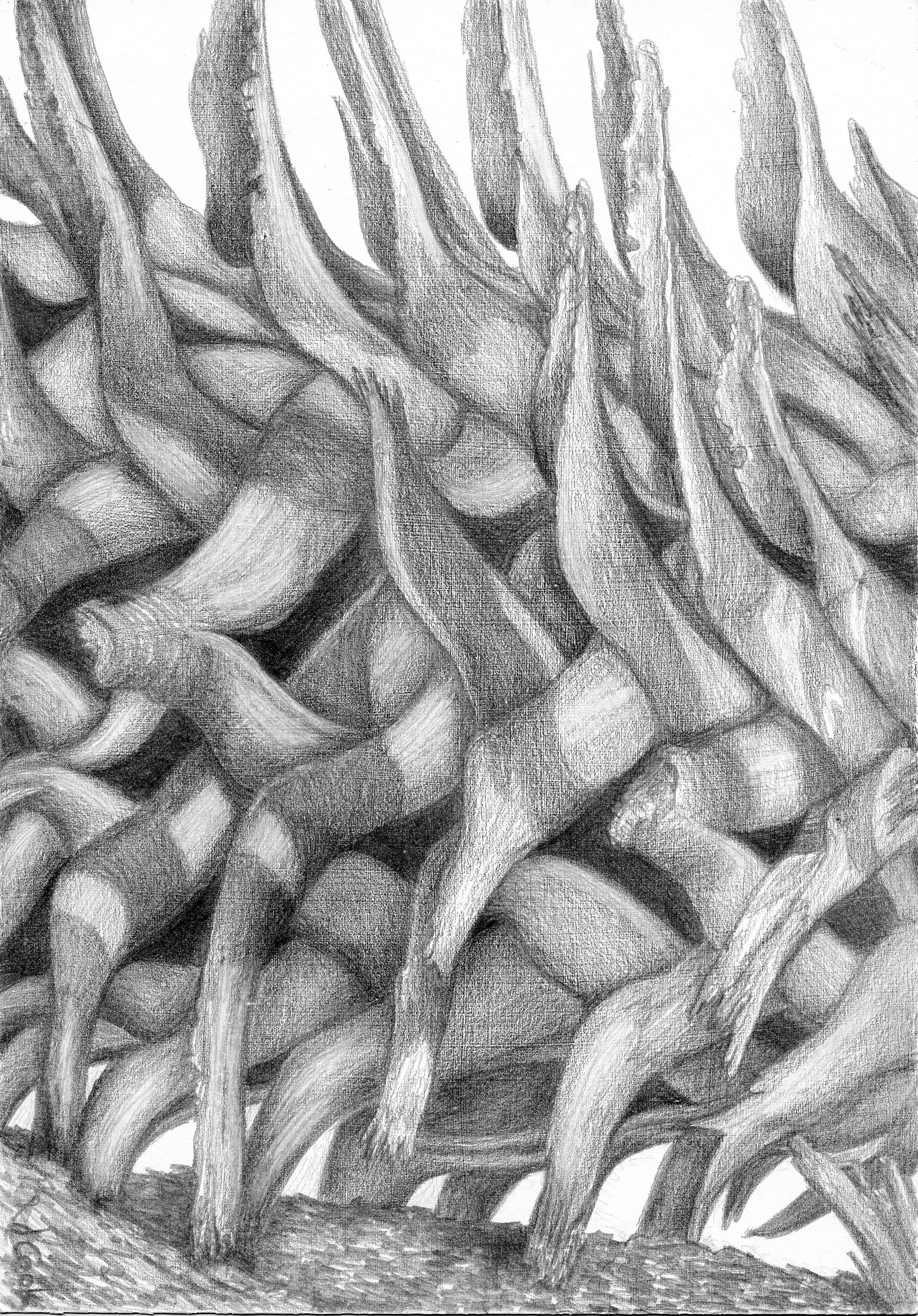
Fallen Palmetto, silverpoint, Jeannine Cook

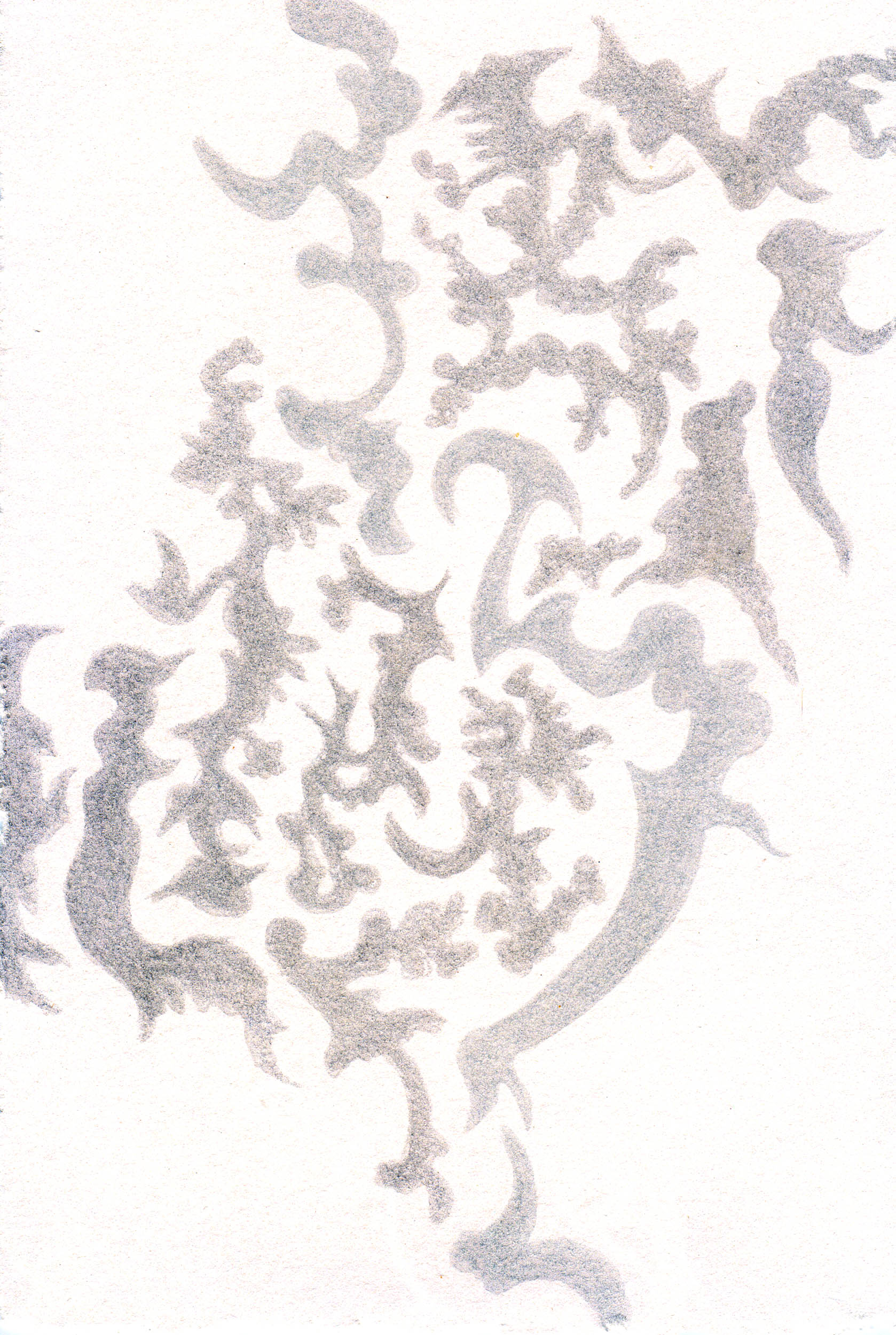
Limestone Lace, silverpoint, goldpoint, Jeannine Cook

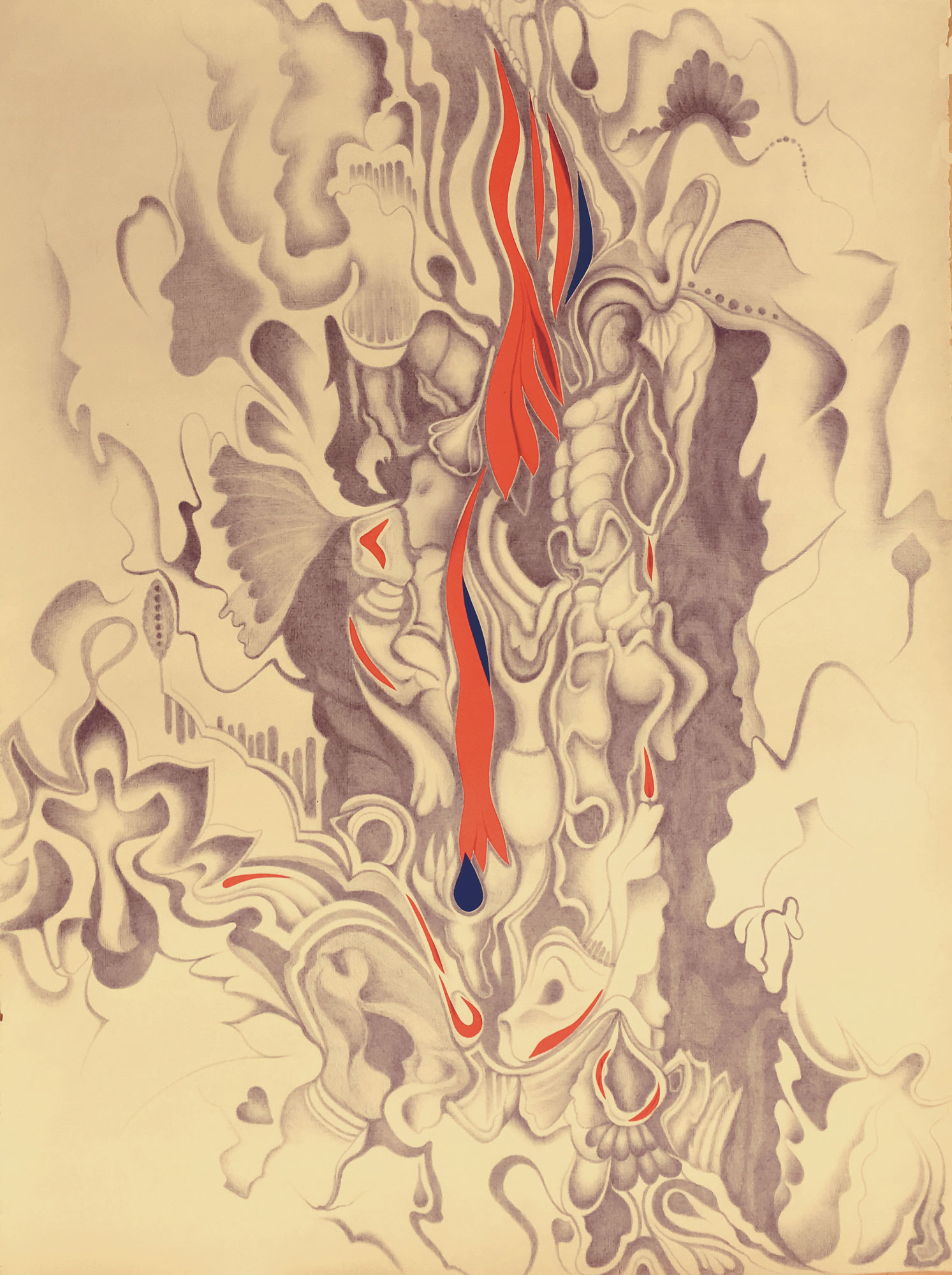
Miró's Pine Tree 2, silverpoint, Plike paper, Jeannine Cook

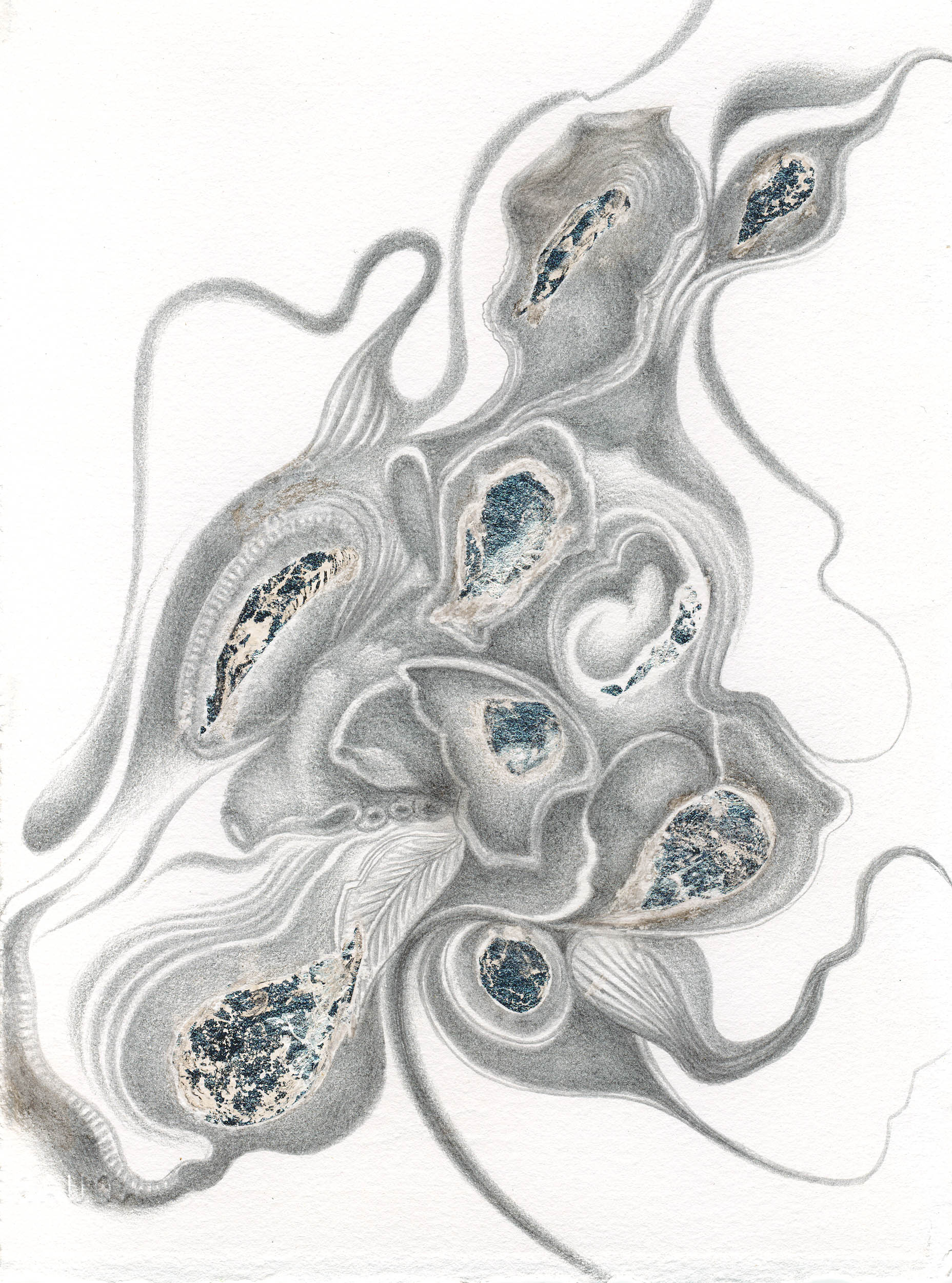
Pierres de Chablis, silverpoint, silver leaf, watercolour, Jeannine Cook

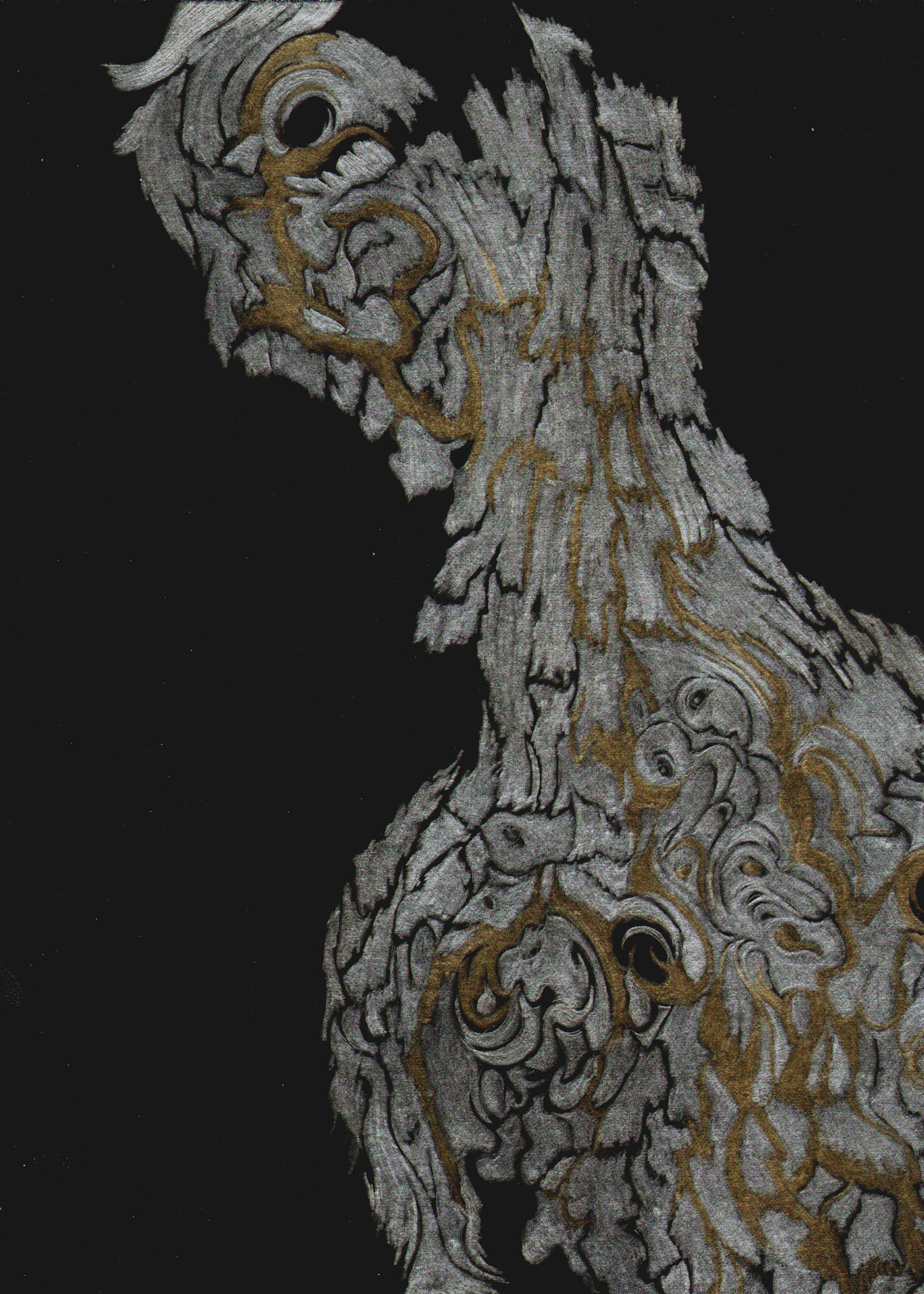
Cork Oak Contours, goldpoint, silverpoint, Jeannine Cook

== Life ==
Cook was born in Kenya, and grew up on her family's farm in the Northern Province of Tanzania, near Arusha.From an early age she had a keen interest in agriculture, and worked alongside the Africans, Afrikaans, British and Sikhs employed on the mixed farms. With her mother, Patricia Wright, guiding her, she learnt the correct botanical structure and petal colour of innumerable flowers grown commercially for seed, whilst also participating in the cultivation of coffee, seed beans and aromatic plants used for the perfume trade. Cook's family members were committed environmentalists long before the term became widely known. Living with her parents and widely-travelled grandparents in the same house, Cook was exposed to Australian, European, Asian (particularly Japanese) and African cultural influences. This exposure almost certainly contributed to the development of her passion for nature, travelling and all forms of art. The long, fascinated hours she spent in the darkroom with her photographer grandfather kindled her love of monochromatic photographs and drawings. In addition to these influences, she learned much of local and British politics as both her grandfather, Francis James Anderson, and father, Jack Wright, were very politically active.

Cook finished her high school education at Limuru High School, outside Nairobi, Kenya, at the same time that the then Tanganyika (later Tanzania) became independent. She continued her studies in languages and business in London and Paris, then worked in the international European Launcher Development Organisation (the precursor to the European Space Agency), before taking another degree at EFAP, the French communications school. She married British scientist Albert Rundle Cook and moved to New York, where she divided her time between art and non-fiction writing, publishing work in Connoisseur Magazine and other publications. Cook and her husband moved to Georgia in 1983, where she became a full-time artist. Cook worked from her studio in coastal Georgia, before moving to Palma de Mallorca. Her primary artistic medium is metalpoint drawing.

== Career ==
=== Artistic Practice ===
Cook is among the early contemporary metalpoint artists currently employing the medium, having undertaken the practice in 1979. Prior to her metalpoint drawing, she had worked as a silversmith.

Frequently cited in written works on the topic of metalpoint, Cook has also taught and presented talks on the technique and curated metalpoint exhibitions.

Metalpoint was famously employed in European monasteries' scriptoria, such as Lindisfarne, in the 8th century AD but centuries before, in 77 AD, Pliny the Elder had alluded to drawing in silver in his Natural History. Highly conscious of metalpoint's illustrious heritage, Cook draws mostly in silver, always from real life, and does not lay out any preparatory indications on the drawing surface before starting her drawing in metal. She believes that working directly from life confers spontaneity to a drawing, making it possible for intuition to guide the drawing and allowing the subject matter to dictate. For Cook, this method of drawing allows for unexpected results and opportunities to grow as an artist.

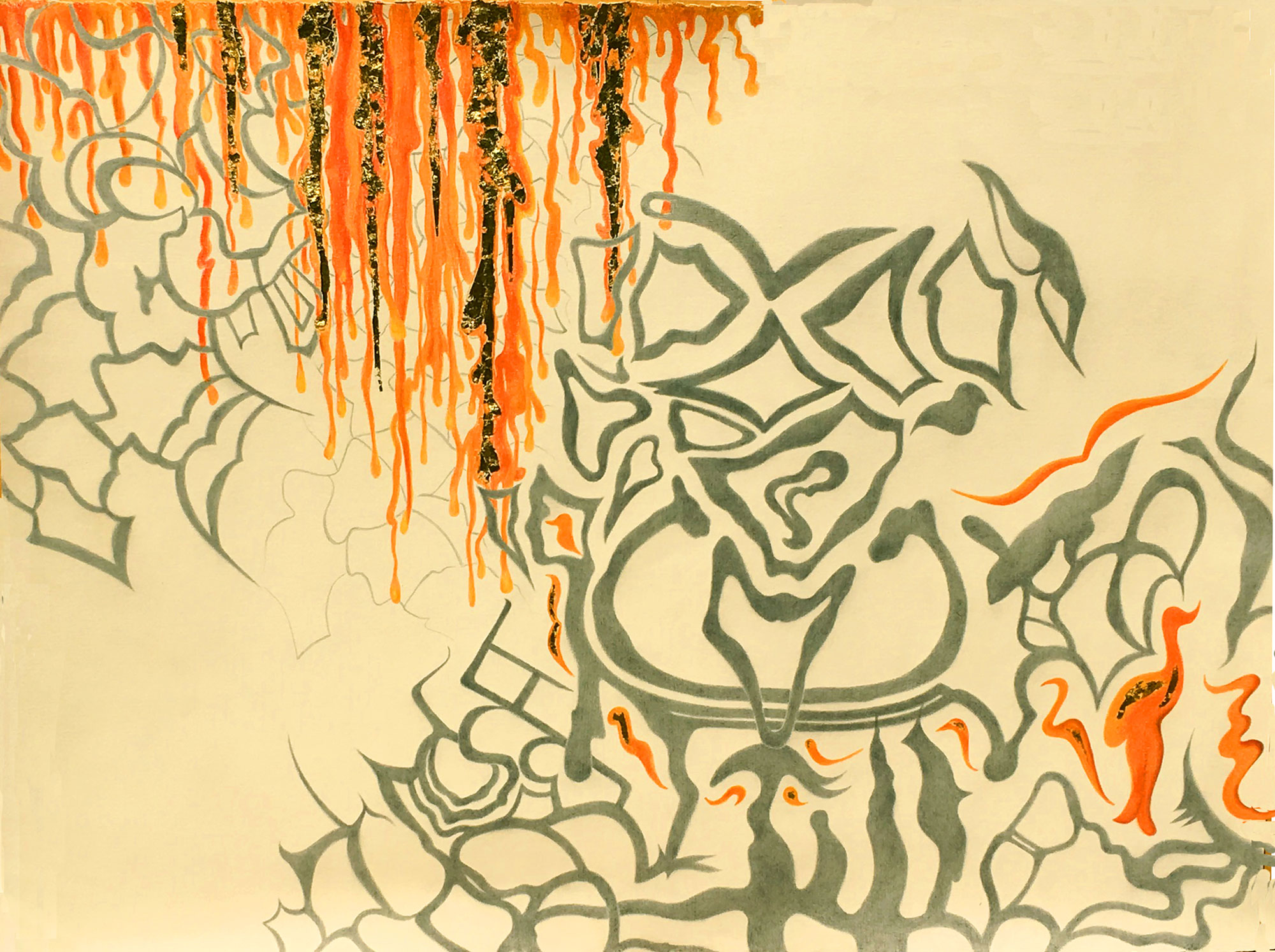
Miro's Pine Tree 1, silverpoint, Jeannine Cook

Rigorous in her choice of archival-quality materials, Cook most often prepares her smooth drawing supports in advance with acrylic-based grounds, particularly if she is drawing outdoors in hot and insect-filled environments. Working on paper, board, and occasionally porcelain, the artist lets the silver and copper drawings tarnish naturally.

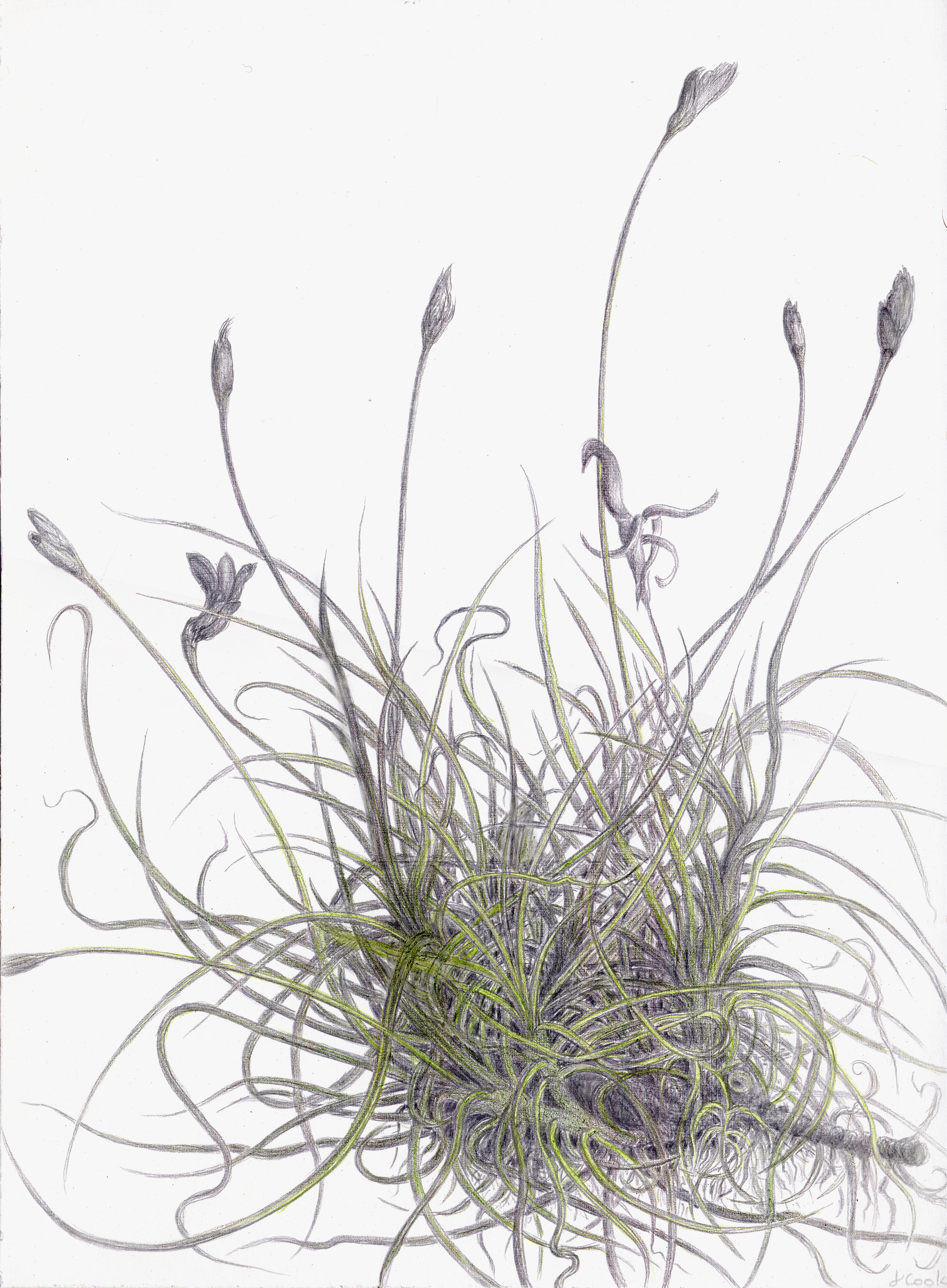
Summer Energy - Tillandsia recurvata, silverpoint, watercolour, Jeannine Cook

Like other contemporary metalpoint artists, Cook experiments with the medium, exploring innovative ways to extend its unique properties. She frequently combines touches of colour with the monochromatic drawings, employing such media as Prismacolour, Polychromos pencil, watercolour, Plike paper, Washi papers, silk fabric and silk threads, whilst at other times she uses coloured grounds or coloured supports, such as in the drawing Tillandsia recurvata. Her artistic vocabulary also includes gold and silver foil and marks made with wide metal tools (spoons, rings or bracelets, wedges of silver, etc.). Her drawings on paper are executed in a range of sizes. Her oeuvre also includes artist books and watercolour paintings.

Cook's use of the mark-making metals is varied in style, ranging from realistic drawings of flowers, landscapes and other natural subjects to seemingly abstract studies of barks, stones and other natural materials, often depicted realistically but at close range.

Series have included Joan Miró-inspired drawings done in and about the Fundación Pilar i Joan Miró in Palma de Mallorca, Pensando en Miro, a series entitled Terratorium based on the Chablis region in Burgundy, France, and De Natvræ, studies of nature drawn from many different sources. In 2022, Cook embarked on an ambitious large-scale project entitled Olive Tree Waltzes, an ensemble of drawings in silverpoint and goldpoint that are designed to be shown together.

Much of Cook's work has been carried out while in residency in France at La Porte Peinte Centre pour les Arts, Noyers sur Serein, Bordeneuve Retreat, Betchat (Ariège), and Hôtel Sainte Valière, Sainte Valière, as well aa at OBRAS, Estremoz (Portugal), Kamiyama (Shikoku, Japan) and RUC (Cividate Camuno, Lombardy, Italy).

As Cook has evolved as a metalpoint artist, her choice of subject matter has widened from the early botanical studies which have been influenced by her nature-oriented East African life. Deeply passionate about environmental issues, Cook's works advocate for a deeper connection to nature by focusing on details which communicate the past and present of natural features, such as hurricane-struck red cedar trees, tree barks and stones. Given that the majority of the world's population is now urban, Cook aims to share the intricacy, elegance and vital importance of even the smallest aspect of life in the natural world.

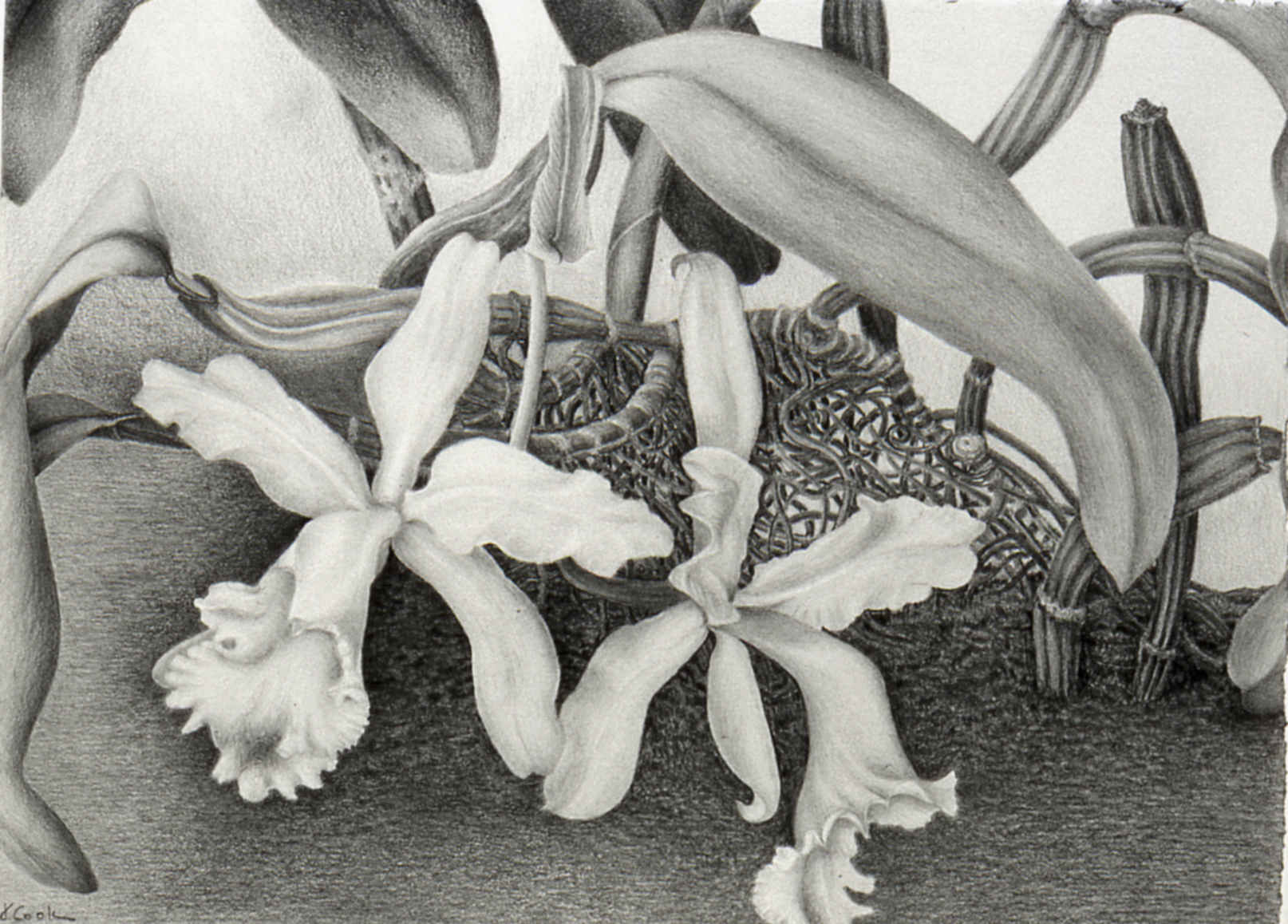
Remembering (Catteleya), graphite, Jeannine Cook

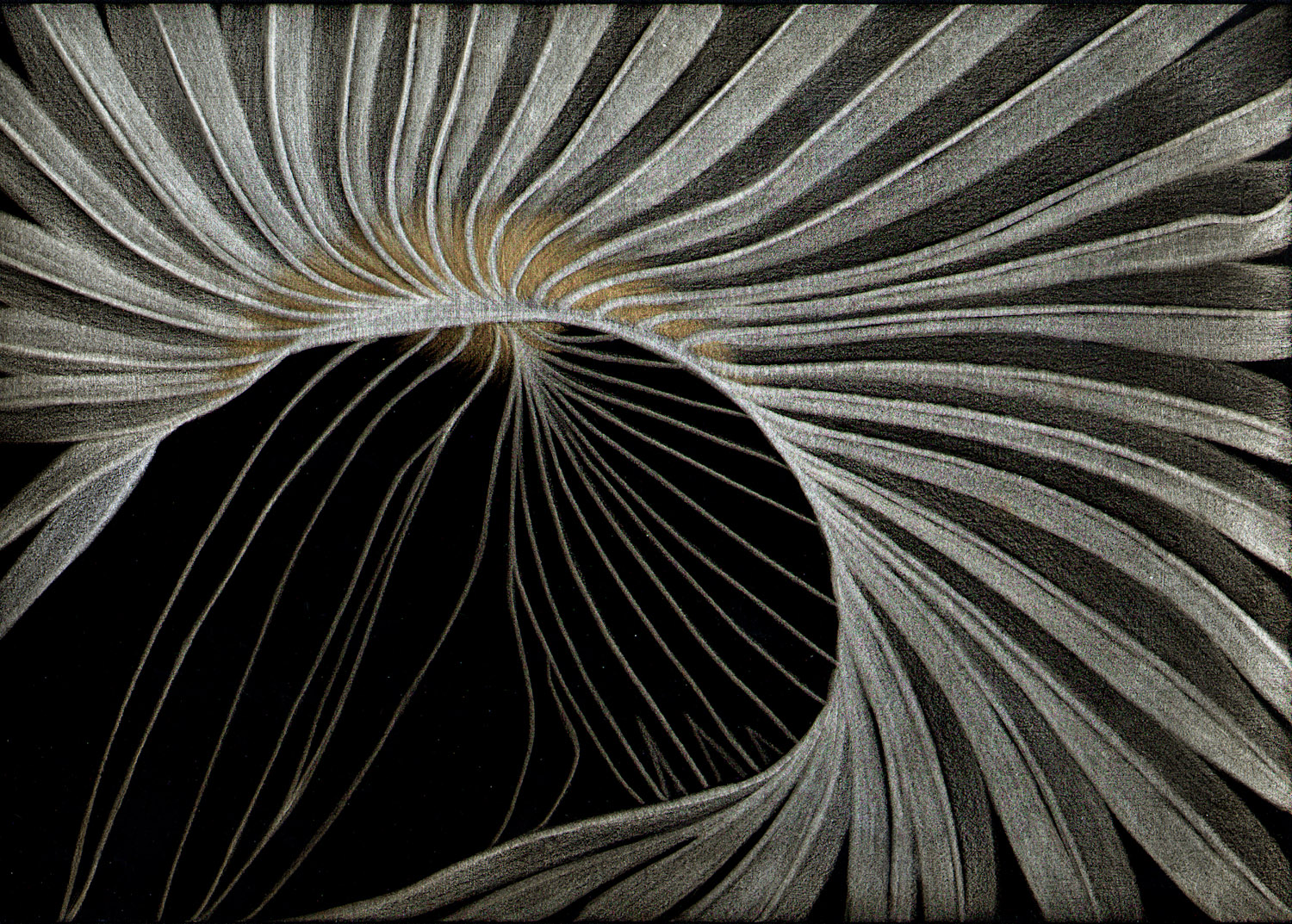
Palmetto Frond, silverpoint, Jeannine Cook

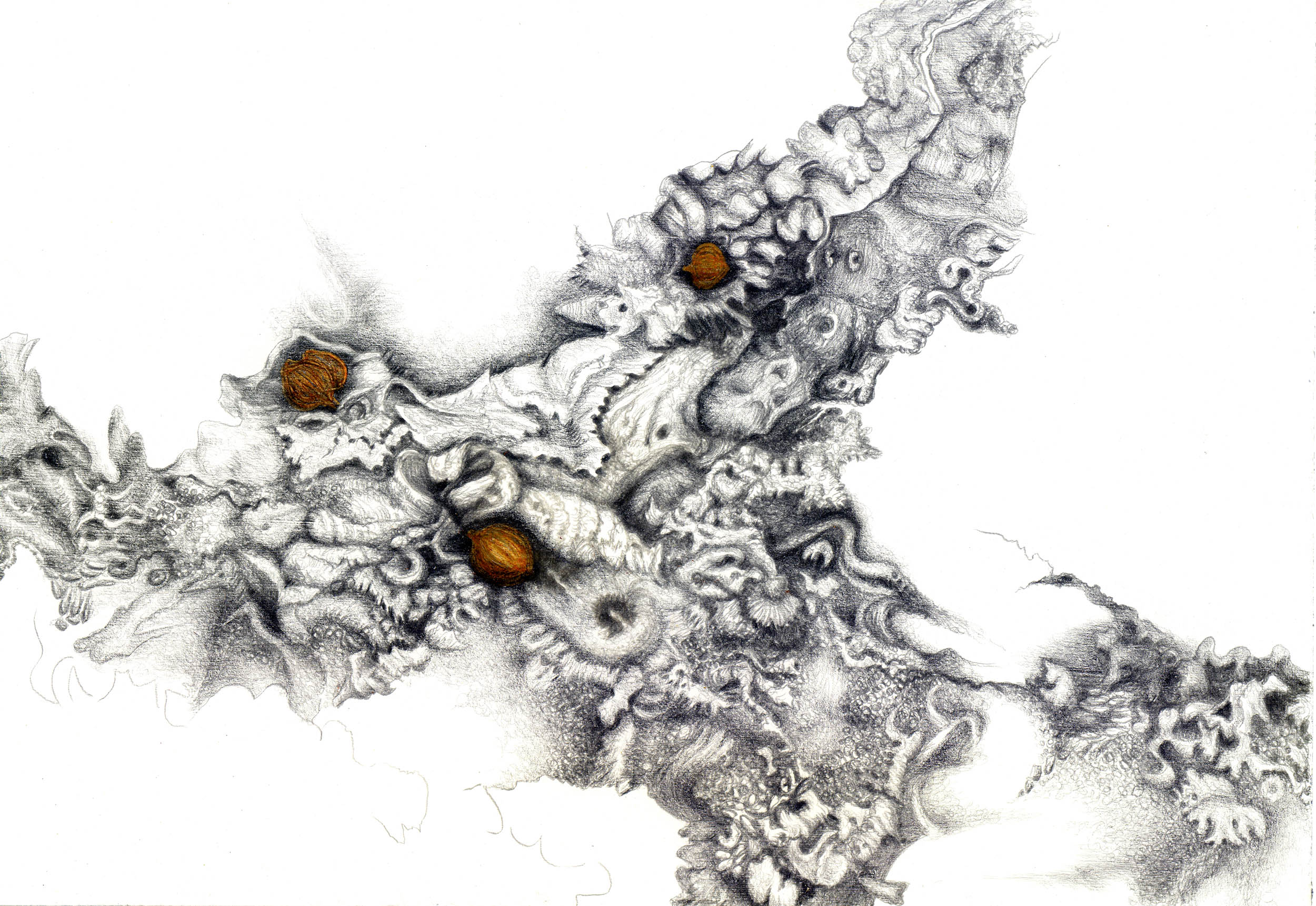
Stone Lace I, silverpoint, Prismacolour, Jeannine Cook

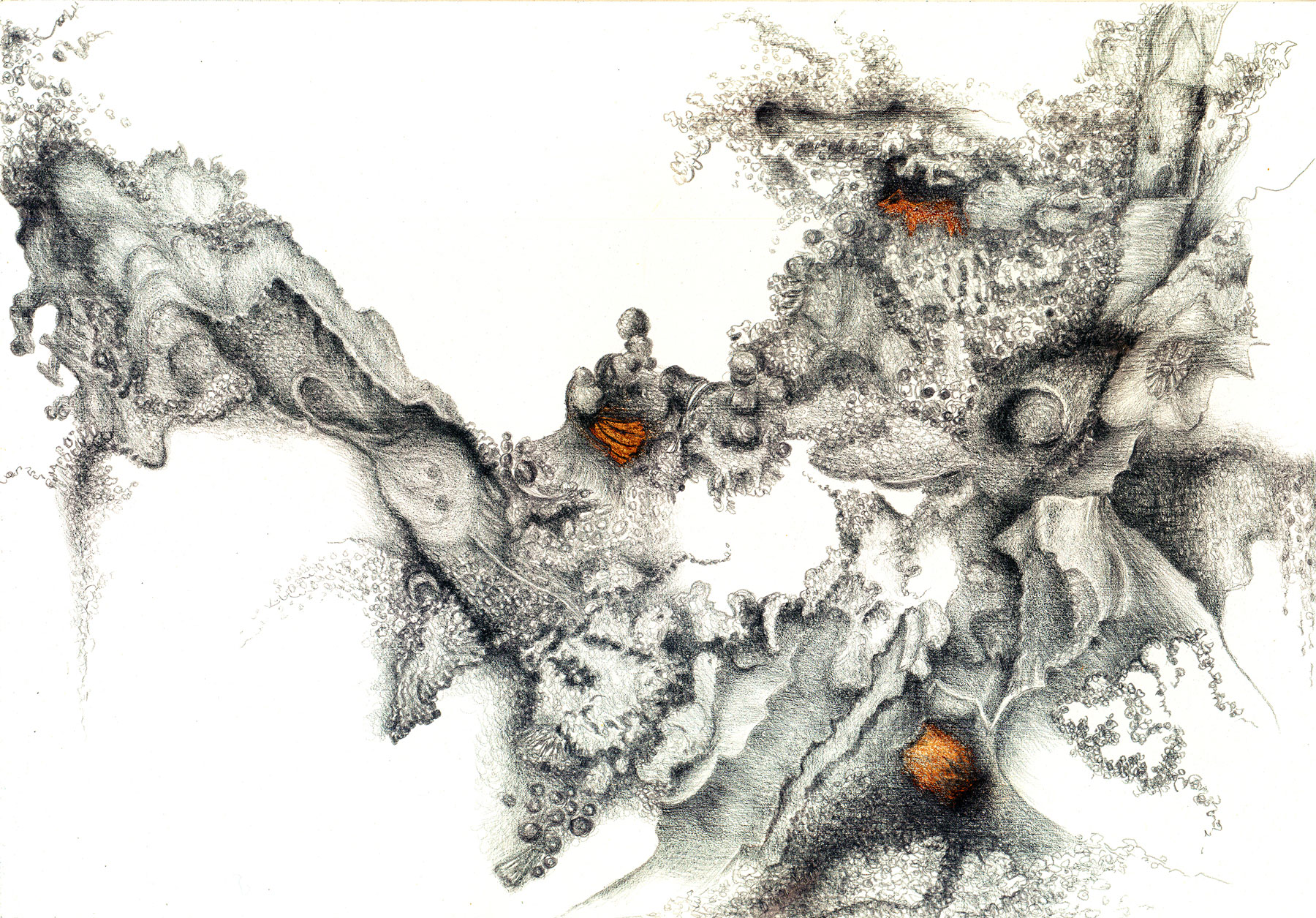
Stone Lace II, silverpoint, Jeannine Cook

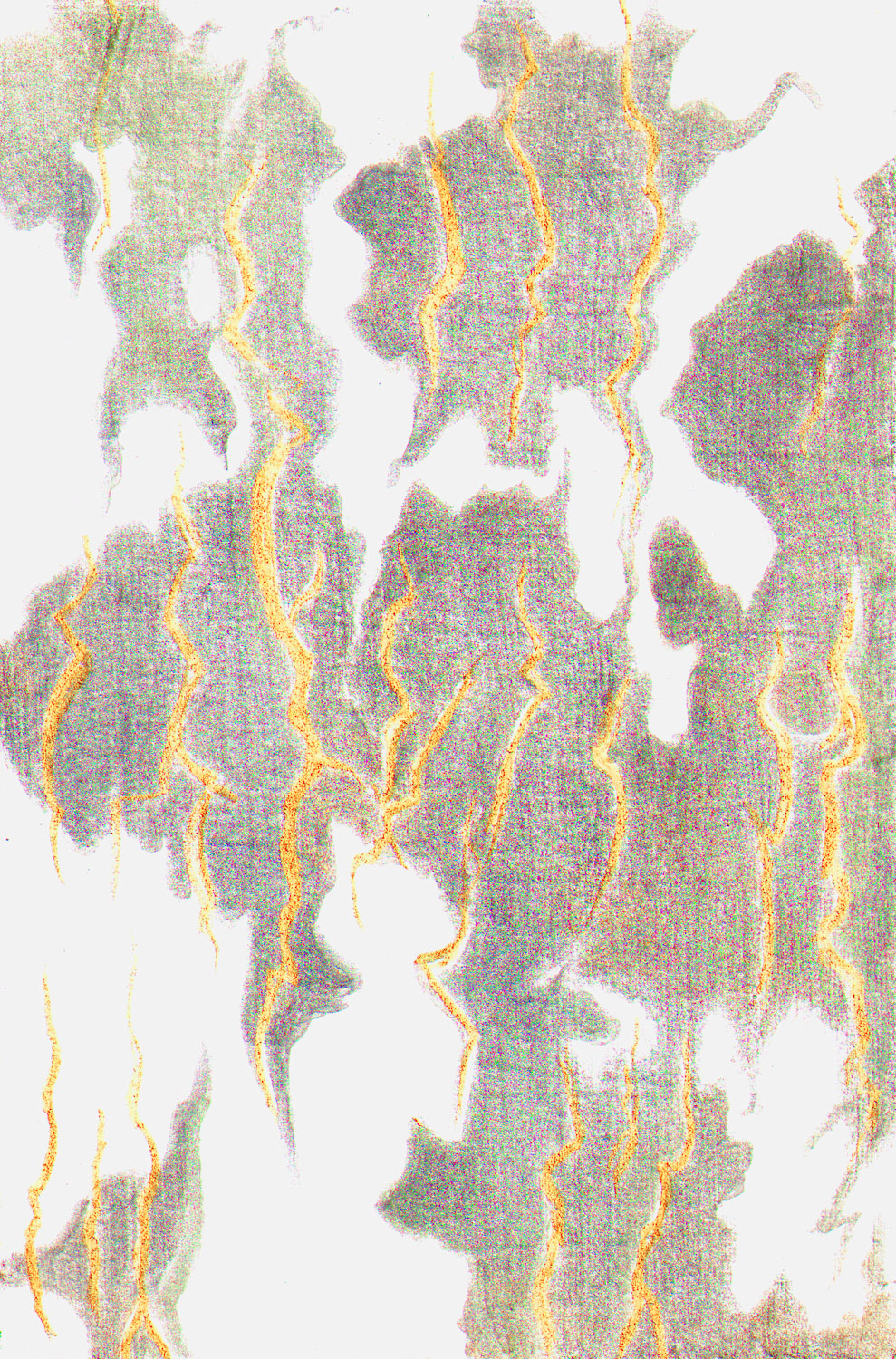
Japanese Maple Bark, silverpoint, copperpoint, Prismacolour, Jeannine Cook

=== Exhibitions ===
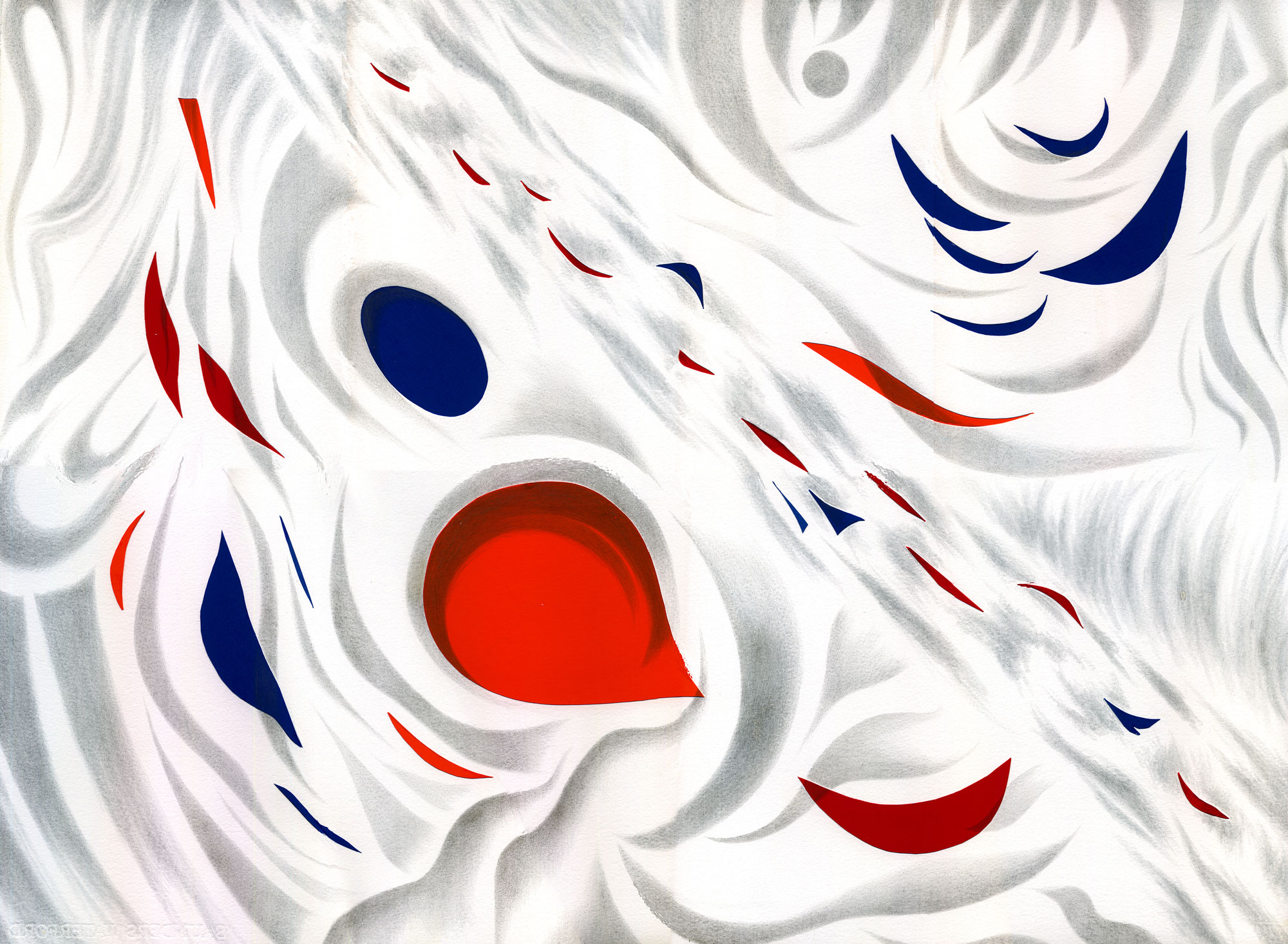
Pensando en Miró 1, silverpoint, Plike paper, Jeannine Cook

Cook's metalpoint drawings have been shown in solo exhibitions in over a dozen museums and galleries in the past 10 years, while she has also participated in more than 22 juried or invitational metalpoint gallery and museum group shows since 2010 in the United States, Europe and online. Exhibition venues have included:

- El Jardín Botánico Histórico La Concepción (Málaga, Spain)
- Can Vivot (Palma de Mallorca, Spain)
- MA Arte Contemporaneo (Palma de Mallorca, Spain)
- San Diego Museum of Art (San Diego, California)
- Can Prunera Museu Modernista (Soller, Mallorca)
- The Ashantilly Center (Darien, GA)
- Emory University (Atlanta)
- Birmingham Botanical Gardens (Alabama)
- Norfolk Arts Center (Norfolk, Nebraska)
- Fundación Barceló (Mallorca, Spain)
- Telfair Museums (Savannah, Georgia)
- National Arts Club (New York)
- Clement Art Gallery (Troy, New York)
- Evansville Museum of Arts, History and Science (Indiana)
- Musée des Arts Naïfs et Populaires de Noyers,(Noyers sur Serein, Yonne, France)
- The Colors of Humanity Art Gallery (online)
- Marbury NYC (New York, New York)
- Morris Graves Museum of Art (Eureka, California)
- Swope Art Museum (Terre Haute, Indiana)
- BAMPFA (Berkeley, California)
- North Carolina Museum of Natural Sciences (Raleigh).

=== Collections ===
Cook's metalpoint drawings are in the permanent collections of more than forty public art institutions in Europe, the United States and Australia, including The British Museum (London, England), the Victoria & Albert Museum (London, England), The Fitzwilliam Museum (Cambridge University, UK), New Hall Women's Art Collection (at Murray Edwards College, Cambridge University, UK), the National Museum of Women in the Arts (Washington), The Museum of Fine Arts Houston, Texas, the Museo de Bellas Artes de Bilbao (Spain), Huntington Museum of Art (Huntington, West Virginia), Fort Wayne Museum of Art (Fort Wayne, Indiana), Gibbes Museum of Art (Charleston, SC), McNay Museum of Art (San Antonio, Texas), Western Australian Museum (Perth, Western Australia), The State Library of Western Australia, Perth, Legion Paper East, (New York, New York), North Carolina Museum of Natural Sciences (Raleigh, NC), Dr. Shirley A. Sherwood Collection (London, England), Mayo Foundation (Rochester, MN), Spring Island Trust (Spring Island, Okatie, South Carolina), and Consell de Mallorca (Balearic Islands Government, Palma de Mallorca, Spain).

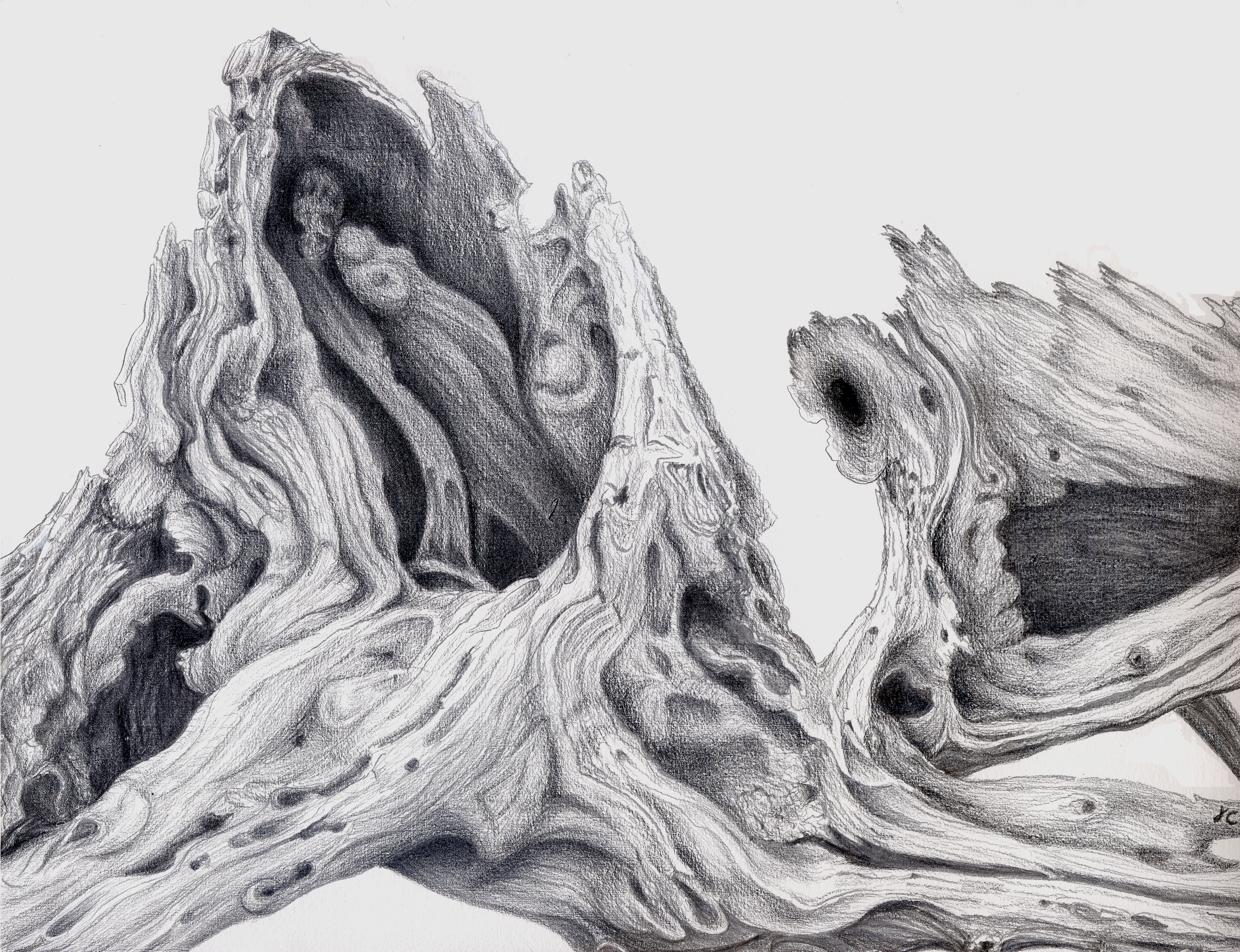
The Weathered Cedar, silverpoint, Jeannine Cook. Collection of the British Museum, London, England.

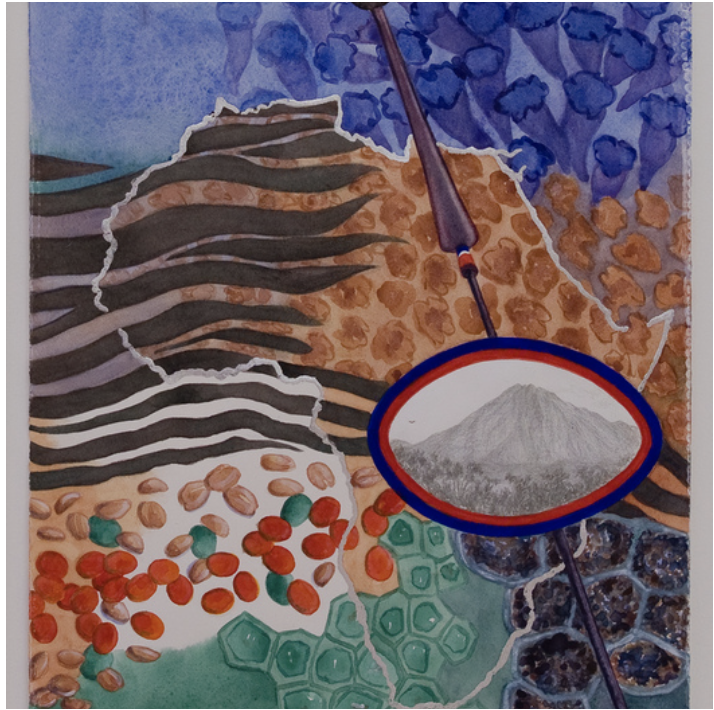
Patterns of Africa, mixed media, Jeannine Cook. Collection of New Hall Art Collection, Murray Edwards College, University of Cambridge, Cambridge, England.

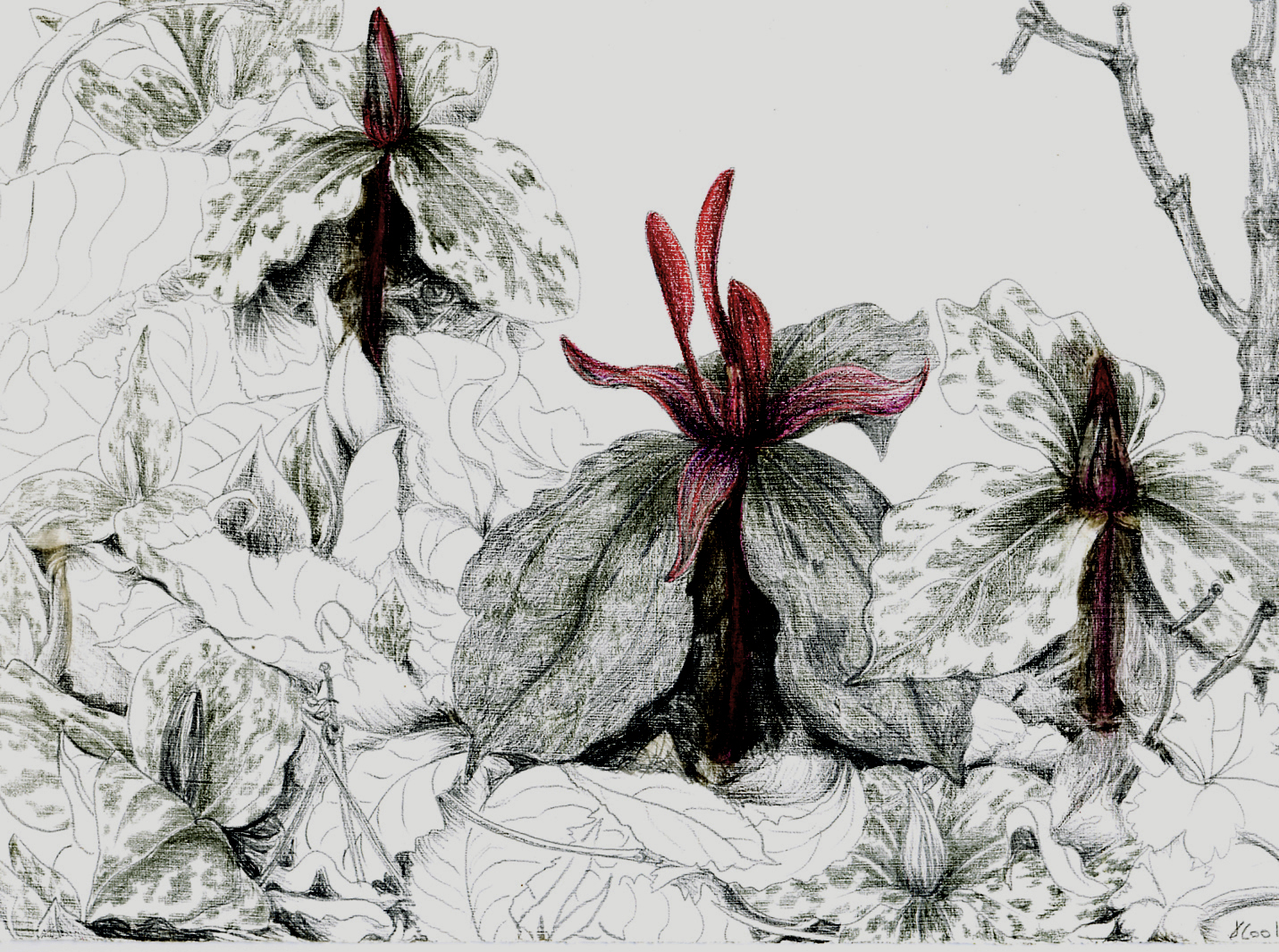
Trillium maculatum, Spring Island, silverpoint, copperpoint, Jeannine Cook. Collection of Spring Island Trust, Okatie, South Carolina, USA.
