= Susan Schwalb =

American painter

- Strata #502 by Susan Schwalb
- Born: 1944 (age 81–82); New York City, New York
- Education: Carnegie Mellon University
- Known for: contemporary painter

Susan Schwalb is a contemporary silverpoint artist.

== Biography ==
Schwalb was born in New York City (in 1944). She attended the Carnegie Mellon University. In 1983 she married composer Martin Boykan and works from her Manhattan studio.

Her work is represented in the National Gallery of Art, Washington D.C., The Metropolitan Museum of Art the British Museum, London, the Brooklyn Museum, New York, the Fogg Museum, Harvard University, Cambridge, Massachusetts, the Museum of Fine Arts, Houston, Texas, the Library of Congress, Washington, DC, the Rose Art Museum, Brandeis University, Waltham, Massachusetts, and the Yale University Art Gallery, New Haven, Connecticut.
