= Oswald Jonas =

Austrian musicologist (1897–1978)

Oswald Jones
- Born: January 10, 1897
- Died: March 19, 1978 (aged 81)

Oswald Jonas (January 10, 1897 – March 19, 1978) was a music theorist and musicologist, and student of Heinrich Schenker. Despite Schenker's conservative nationalist views Jonas was an admirer of Karl Kraus.

In 1935, Jonas founded the Schenker Institut and began publishing Der Dreiklang with Felix Salzer. The Oswald Jonas Memorial Collection, housed at the University of California, Riverside Library, holds the complete diaries of Schenker and much of the correspondence and manuscripts of Erwin Ratz, Jonas's first student. His primary students include Felix Salzer, Ernst Oster, and Sylvan Kalib.

He taught at Roosevelt University in Chicago from 1941 to 1964, and then until his death he taught at the University of California Riverside, where his materials, as well as Schenker's Nachlass, is deposited in the Special Collections Library.

== See also ==
- Klang (music)
- Schenkerian analysis

== Bibliography ==
- (1982). Introduction to the Theory of Heinrich Schenker (1934: Das Wesen des musikalischen Kunstwerks: Eine Einführung in die Lehre Heinrich Schenkers). Trans. John Rothgeb. ISBN 0-582-28227-6.
- http://www.columbia.edu/~maurice/schenker/biogfile/jonas_oswald.html
