= Silverpoint =

Traditional drawing technique and tool

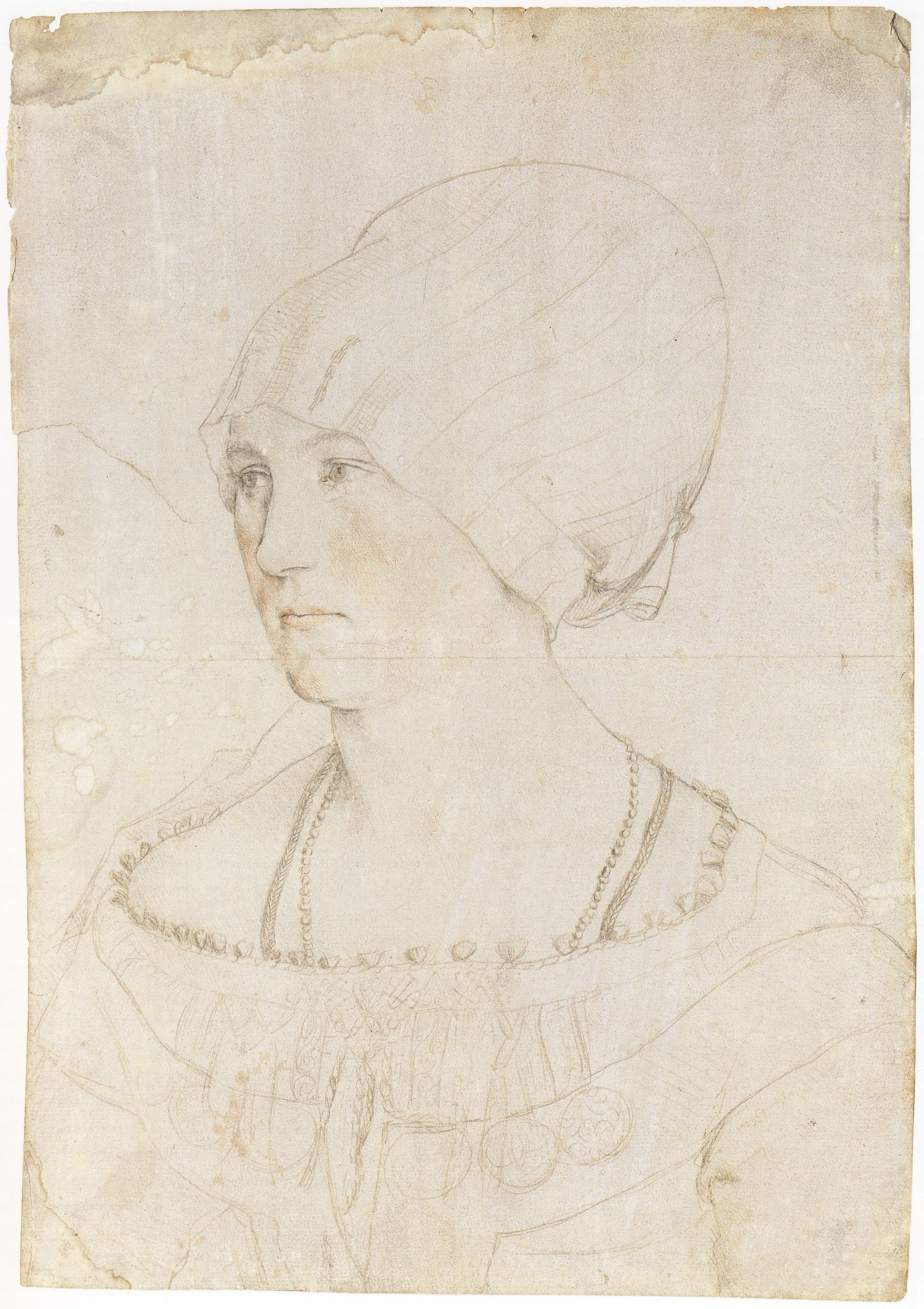
Portrait Study of Dorothea Meyer, by Hans Holbein the Younger, 1516. Silverpoint, red chalk, and traces of black pencil on white-coated paper, Kunstmuseum Basel.

Silverpoint (one of several types of metalpoint) is a traditional drawing technique and tool first used by medieval scribes on manuscripts.

== History ==
A silverpoint drawing is made by dragging a silver rod or wire across a surface, often prepared with gesso or ground of Chinese white. Silverpoint is one of several types of metalpoint used by scribes, craftsmen and artists since ancient times. Metalpoint styli were used for writing on soft surfaces (wax or bark), ruling and underdrawing on parchment, and drawing on prepared paper and panel supports. For drawing purposes, the essential metals used were lead, tin and silver. The softness of these metals made them effective drawing instruments. Goldsmiths also used metalpoint drawings to prepare their detailed, meticulous designs. Albrecht Dürer's father was one such craftsman who later taught his young son to draw in metalpoint, to such good effect that his 1484 Self-Portrait at the Age of 13 is still considered a masterpiece.

In the late Gothic/early Renaissance era, silverpoint emerged as a fine line drawing technique. Not blunting as easily as lead or tin, and rendering precise detail, silverpoint was especially favored in Florentine and Flemish workshops. Silverpoint drawings of this era include model books and preparatory sheets for paintings. Artists who worked in silverpoint include Jan van Eyck, Leonardo da Vinci, Albrecht Dürer and Raphael. Cennino Cennini's Il Libro dell'Arte provides a window on the practice of silver and leadpoint drawing, as well as preparing metalpoint grounds, in the late 14th century. Susan Dorothea White's book Draw Like da Vinci describes the silverpoint technique of Leonardo da Vinci.

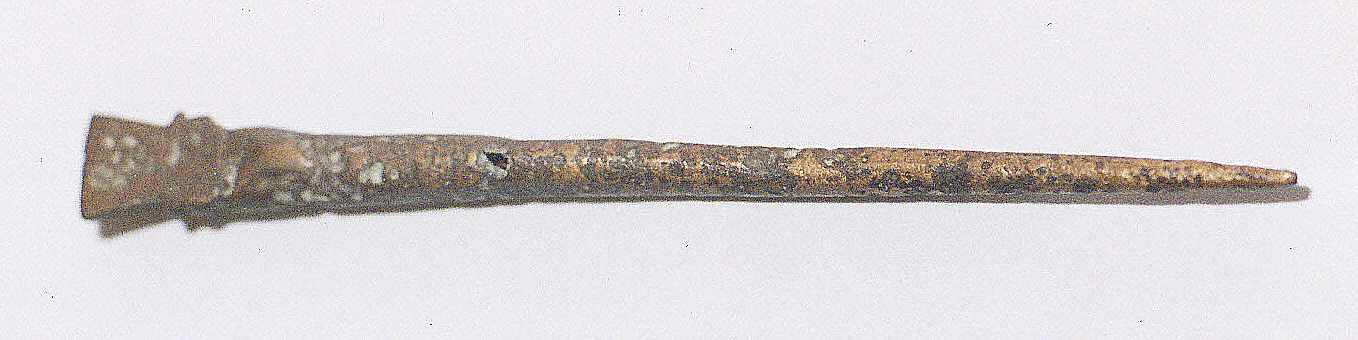
Medieval stylus

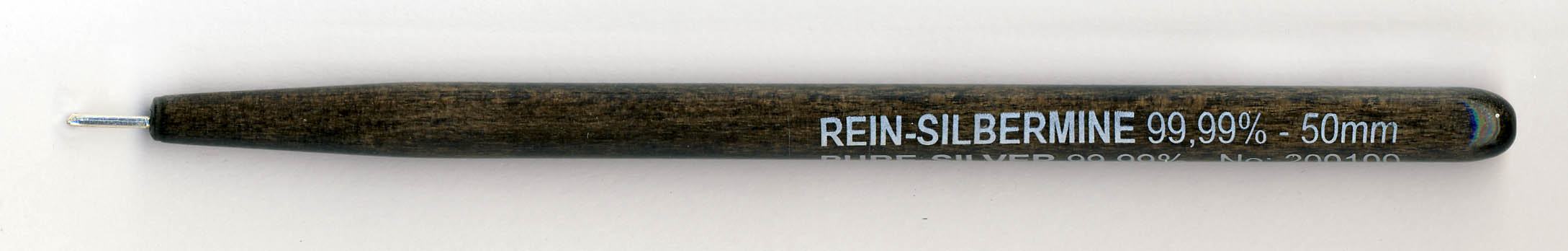
Modern silverpoint stylus

As noted by Francis Ames-Lewis, drawing styles changed at the end of the 16th century, resulting in a decline for metalpoint. The discovery of graphite deposits at Seathwaite in Borrowdale, Cumbria, England, in the early 1500s, and its increasing availability to artists in a pure, soft (and erasable) form hastened silverpoint's eclipse. Artists sought more gestural qualities, for which graphite, red and black chalk were better suited. Ink and wash drawings are also prevalent in the period. In addition, these other drawing techniques required less effort and were more forgiving than silver, which resists erasure and leaves a fainter line. Furthermore, the preparation of silverpoint supports, usually with hide glue with finely ground bone ash, was labor-intensive. Modern practitioners use zinc, pre-prepared acrylic-based grounds or titanium white tempera or marble dust as a ground. Natural chalks and charcoal have the advantage of producing immediate results on uncoated papers.

Dutch artists Hendrick Goltzius and Rembrandt maintained the silverpoint tradition into the 17th century, as it declined in other parts of Europe. Rembrandt made several silverpoints on prepared vellum, the best-known being the portrait of his wife Saskia, 1633. Botanical artists and architects continued to use metalpoint because of its exact lines. However, artists who continued this tradition of fine line drawing, such as Jean-Auguste-Dominique Ingres, turned to graphite, which gradually improved in quality and availability throughout Europe since the 17th century. Silverpoint was for practical purposes rendered obsolete by the 18th century. There has however been a contemporary art revival among European and American artists and academies because the medium imposes considerable discipline in draughtsmanship since drawings cannot be erased or altered.

== Revival ==
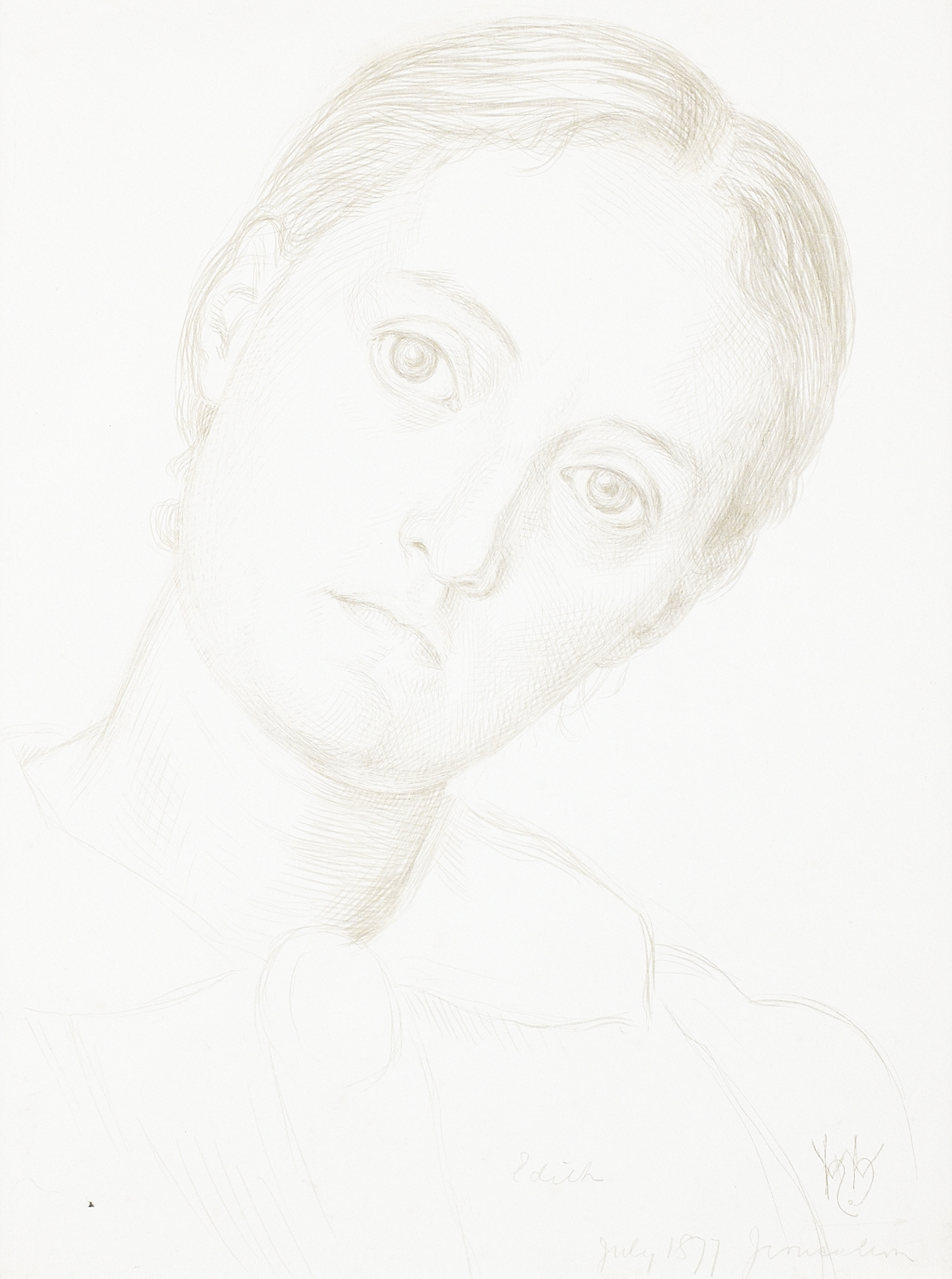
Artist's Wife, Edith Holman Hunt by William Holman Hunt, a founding member of the Pre-Raphaelite Brotherhood. Birmingham Museum of Art.

Joseph Meder, Alphonse Legros, the Pre-Raphaelites and Joseph Stella helped revitalize the technique. Art historian Meder created interest in the traditional technique in Austria and Germany, while artist and teacher Legros did likewise in England. In the early 20th century, Stella was one of the few American artists working in this method on the East Coast of the United States. Stella explored the technique on zinc white gouache prepared grounds, often with crayon and other media. Stella's silverpoint oeuvre includes the 1921 portrait of Marcel Duchamp (MoMA, Katherine S. Dreier Bequest). On the West Coast Xavier Martínez, the Mexican-American artist who had studied in Paris at the École nationale supérieure des Beaux-Arts in the late 1890s during the resurgence of interest in silverpoint, taught this technique at the California College of the Arts from 1909 to the late 1930s. The last known exhibition of Martinez's silverpoints was in 1921 at the Print Room of San Francisco where critics praised his "unusual" and "strongly futuristic" action figures on an unconventional dark mottled ground as "archaic in execution ... terse, alert ... with a bit too much flesh."

An exhibit, "The Fine Line: Drawing with Silver in America" was curated for the Norton Museum of Art, in 1985 by Bruce Weber. In 2015, the National Gallery of Art and the British Museum exhibited "Drawing in Silver and Gold: Leonardo to Jasper Johns".

== Characteristics ==
A traditional silverpoint stylus is made with a small fine rod of silver, such as jewelry wire, which is inserted into a wooden rod. Another design is a silver-tipped metal stylus with points on both ends. An example of this type is shown in Rogier van der Weyden's St. Luke Drawing the Virgin, ca. 1435–40 (Boston Museum of Fine Arts). For a contemporary stylus, jeweler's wire may be inserted into a pin vise or mechanical pencil.

The initial marks of silverpoint appear grey as other metalpoints, but silverpoint lines, when exposed to air, tarnish to a warm brown tone. The oxidation becomes perceptible over a period of several months. The speed of oxidation varies according to the level of pollution in the air. Historically, silverpoint styli ranged widely in composition from pure silver to heavily alloyed with copper (over 20% weight).

In the Middle Ages, metalpoint was used directly on parchment for the underdrawing of illuminated manuscripts or model books. On uncoated parchment (and paper), silverpoint is particularly light in value. However, since the 14th century, silverpoint was used more successfully on prepared supports. A traditional ground may be prepared with a rabbit skin glue solution pigmented with bone ash, chalk and/or lead white. Contemporary grounds include acrylic gesso, gouache and commercially prepared claycoat papers. The slight tooth of the ground preparation takes a little of the silver as it is drawn across the surface.

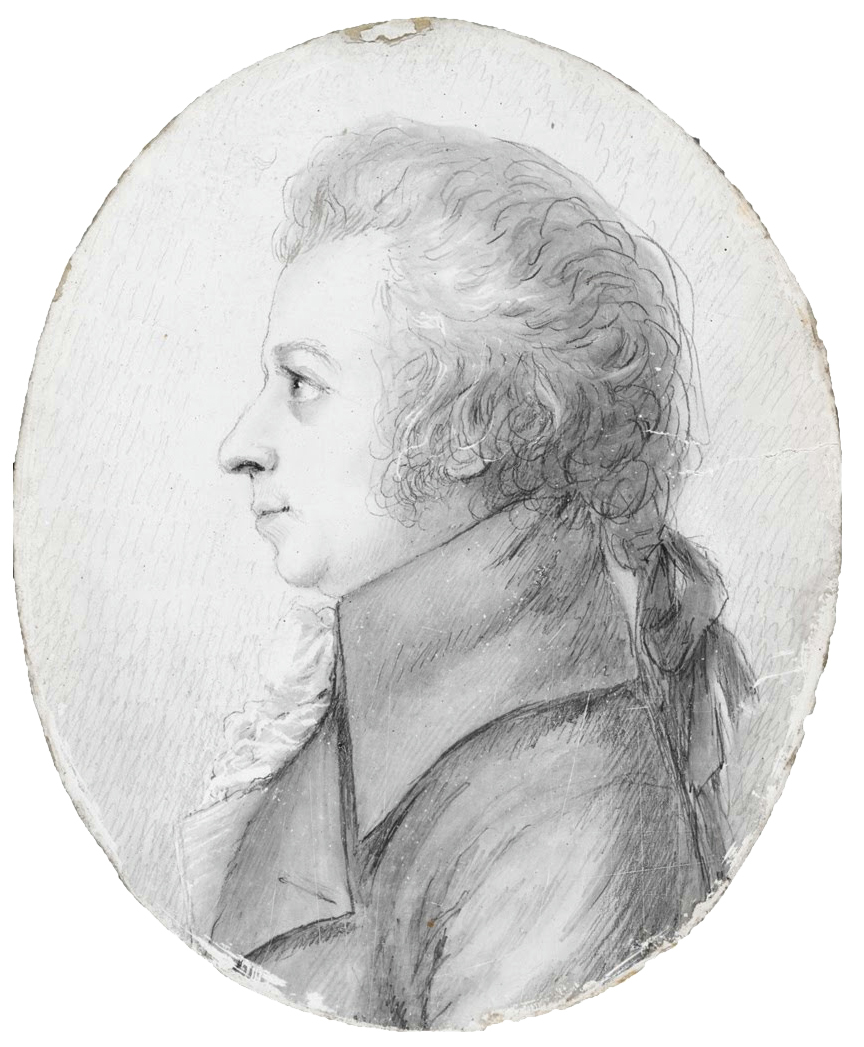
A 1789 portrait of Mozart in silverpoint by Doris Stock

Silverpoint has encompassed a wide range of styles from Dürer's curvilinear precision to Rembrandt's gestural sketches. Silverpoint has also proven adaptable to modern styles. Thomas Wilmer Dewing's late 19th Century silverpoint portraits are essentially tonal, as are Paula Gerard's mid-20th-century abstract compositions. Gerard's Vortex (Fairweather Hardin Gallery) is an innovative combination of silverpoint, goldpoint and watercolor on casein-coated parchment.

Old Master silverpoints are typically intimate in scale, recalling the technique's roots in manuscript illumination. However, modern artists have also utilized this fine line technique for works on an increasingly large scale. John Wilde's The Great Autobiographical Silverpoint Drawing (Art Institute of Chicago 1986.8) which is 38 in × 91 in (97 cm × 231 cm), one of the largest modern silverpoints.

Silverpoint was also used in conjunction with other metal points by 20th-century artists. Pedro Joseph de Lemos, the Director of the San Francisco Art Institute from 1911 to 1917, popularized his "techniques" in California art schools with his published instructions on the easy fabrication of various types of metal points that would react with inexpensive coated paper. In his The Last of the Old Woodstock Inn, 1968 (The Art Institute of Chicago), Ivan Le Lorraine Albright used silver with platinum, gold, copper and brasspoint on commercially prepared video media paper.

Contemporary artists continue to push the boundaries of this ancient drawing technique. Contemporary American silverpoint artist Carol Prusa combines graphite and binder on acrylic hemispheres with metal leaf, video projection and fiber optics. Susan Schwalb has combined smoke and fire in silver and copperpoints in the 1980s and currently creates drawings and paintings using numerous metals as well as acrylic paint. Jeannine Cook combines touches of colour with monochromatic drawings, employing such media as Prismacolour, watercolour, Plike paper, silk fabric and silk threads. Experimental metalpoint techniques including goldpoint on silicon carbide paper are demonstrated in Draw Like da Vinci by Susan Dorothea White, as in Gilding the Lily (2005). Elizabeth Whiteley interfaces with computer-based imagery. She draws with a silver stylus over inkjet prints that have been coated with a translucent prepared ground.

== Sources ==
- Ames-Lewis, Francis (2000). Drawing in Early Renaissance Italy. Yale University Press. ISBN 0-300-07981-8.
- Duval, Alain; Guicharnaud, H; Dran, Jean-Claude (November 2004). "Particle induced X-ray emission: a valuable tool for the analysis of metalpoint". Nuclear Instruments and Methods in Physics Research B. 226 (1–2): 60–74. doi:10.1016/j.nimb.2004.02.020.
- Haskell, Barbara (1994). Joseph Stella. New York: Whitney Museum of American Art, distributed by Harry N. Abrams, Inc.
- Meder, Joseph (1909). Das Buchleim von Silbersteft: Ein Trachtatlein fur Moler. Vienna: Gerlach and Wielding.
- Reiche, Ina; Radtke, Martin; Berger, Achim (2006). "Spatially resolved synchrotron radiation induced X-ray fluorescence analyses of rare Rembrandt silverpoint drawings". Applied Physics A. 83 (2): 163–173. Bibcode:2006ApPhA..83..169R. doi:10.1007/s00339-006-3505-4. S2CID 98189343.
- Reiche, Ina; Radtke, Martin; Berger, Achim (2004). "Spatially resolved sychroton-induced X-ray fluorescence analyses of metal point drawings and their mysterious inscription". Spectrochimica Acta Part B. 59 (10–11): 1657–1662. Bibcode:2004AcSpe..59.1657R. doi:10.1016/j.sab.2004.07.023.
- Watrous, James (1957). The craft of Old Master drawings. Madison: University of Wisconsin Press. ISBN 0-299-01425-8.
