= Music history of Italy =

The modern state of Italy did not come into being until 1861, though the roots of music on the Italian Peninsula can be traced back to the music of ancient Rome. However, the underpinnings of much modern Italian music come from the Middle Ages.

== Before 1500 ==
Italy was the site of several key musical developments in the development of the Christian liturgies in the West. Around 230, well before Christianity was legalized, the Apostolic Tradition of Hippolytus attested the singing of Psalms with refrains of Alleluia in Rome. In 386, in imitation of Eastern models, St. Ambrose wrote hymns, some of whose texts still survive, and introduced antiphonal psalmody to the West. Around 425, Pope Celestine I contributed to the development of the Roman Rite by introducing the responsorial singing of a Gradual, and Cassian, Bishop of Brescia, contributed to the development of the monastic Office by adapting Egyptian monastic psalmody to Western usage. Later, around 530, St. Benedict would arrange the weekly order of monastic psalmody in his Rule. Later, in the 6th century, Venantius Fortunatus created some of Christianity's most enduring hymns, including "Vexilla regis prodeunt" which would later become the most popular hymn of the Crusades.

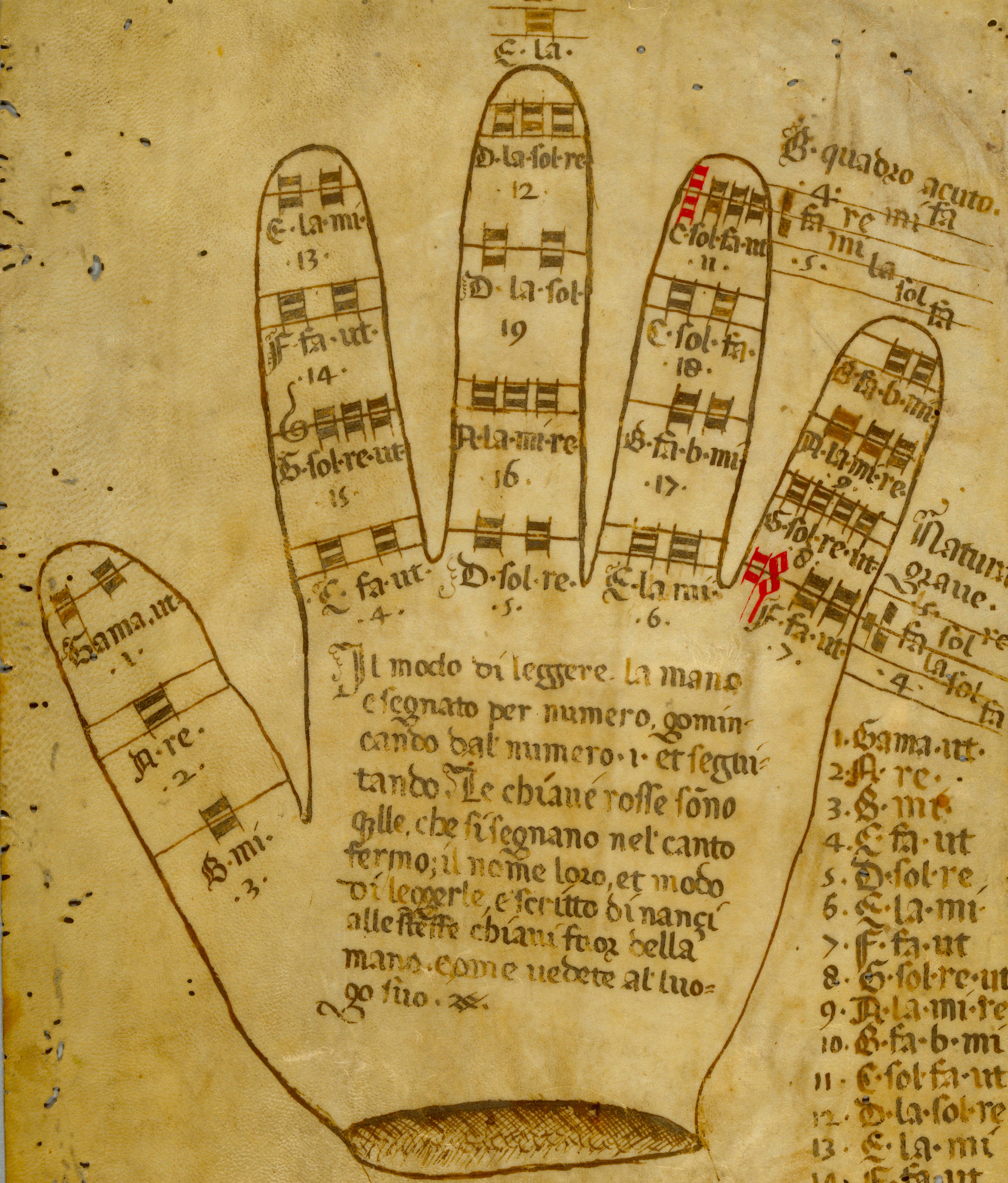
The Guidonian Hand

The earliest extant music in the West is plainsong, a kind of monophonic, unaccompanied, early Christian singing performed by Roman Catholic monks, which was largely developed roughly between the 7th and 12th centuries. Although Gregorian chant has its roots in Roman chant and is popularly associated with Rome, it is not indigenous to Italy, nor was it the earliest nor the only Western plainchant tradition. Ireland, Spain, and France each developed a local plainchant tradition, but only in Italy did several chant traditions thrive simultaneously: Ambrosian chant in Milan, Old Roman chant in Rome, and Beneventan chant in Benevento and Montecassino. Gregorian chant, which supplanted the indigenous Old Roman and Beneventan traditions, derived from a synthesis of Roman and Gallican chant in Carolingian France. Gregorian chant later came to be strongly identified with Rome, especially as musical elements from the north were added to the Roman Rite, such as the Credo in 1014. This was part of a general trend wherein the manuscript tradition in Italy weakened and Rome began to follow northern plainchant traditions. Gregorian chant supplanted all the other Western plainchant traditions, Italian and non-Italian, except for Ambrosian chant, which survives to this day. The native Italian plainchant traditions are notable for a systematic use of ornate, stepwise melodic motion within a generally narrower range, giving the Italian chant traditions a smoother, more undulating feel than the Gregorian. Crucial in the transmission of chant were the innovations of Guido d'Arezzo, whose Micrologus, written around 1020, described the musical staff, solmization, and the Guidonian hand. This early form of do-re-mi created a technical revolution in the speed at which chants could be learned, memorized, and recorded. Much of the European classical musical tradition, including opera and symphonic and chamber music can be traced back to these Italian medieval developments in musical notation, formal music education and construction techniques for musical instruments.

Even as the northern chant traditions were displacing indigenous Italian chant, displaced musicians from the north contributed to a new thriving musical culture in 12th-century Italy. The Albigensian Crusade, supposedly to attack Cathar heretics, brought southern France under northern French control and crushed Occitan culture and language. Most troubadours fled, especially to Spain and Italy. Italy developed its own counterparts to troubadours, called trovatori, including Sordello of Mantua. Frederick II, the last great Hohenstaufen Holy Roman Emperor and King of Sicily, encouraged music at the Sicilian court, which became a refuge for these displaced troubadours, where they contributed to a melting pot of Christian, Jewish, and Muslim musical styles. Italian secular music was largely the province of these jongleurs, troubadors, and mimes. One important consequence of the troubadour influence during this period, in Italy and across Europe, was the gradual shift from writing strictly in Latin to the local language, as championed by Dante in his treatise De vulgari eloquentia; this development extended to the lyrics of popular songs and forms such as the madrigal, meaning "in the mother tongue." Also around this time, Italian flagellants developed the Italian folk hymns known as spiritual laude.

Between 1317 and 1319, Marchettus of Padua wrote the Lucidarium in artae musicae planae and the Pomerium artis musicae mensuratae, major treatises on plainchant and polyphony, expounding a theory of rhythmic notation that paved the way for Trecento music (Italian ars nova). Around 1335, the Rossi Codex, the earliest extant collection of Italian secular polyphony, included examples of indigenous Italian genres of the Trecento including early madrigals, cacce, and ballate. The early madrigal was simpler than the more well-known later madrigals, usually consisting of tercets arranged polyphonically for two voices, with a refrain called a ritornello. The caccia was often in three-part harmony, with the top two lines set to words in musical canon. The early ballata was often a poem in the form of a virelai set to a monophonic melody. The Rossi Codex included music by Jacopo da Bologna, the first famous Trecento composer.

The Ivrea Codex, dated around 1360, and the Squarcialupi Codex, dated around 1410, were major sources of late Trecento music, including the music of Francesco Landini, the famous blind composer. Landini's name was attached to his characteristic "Landini cadence" in which the final note of the melody dips down two notes before returning, such as C–B–A–C. Trecento music influenced northern musicians such as Johannes Ciconia, whose synthesis of the French and Italian styles presaged the "international" music typical of the Renaissance.

During the 15th century, Italy entered a slow period in native composition, with the exception of a few bright lights such as the performer and anthologist Leonardo Giustinian. As the powerful northern families such as the d'Este and Medici built up powerful political dynasties, they brought northern composers of the Franco-Flemish school such as Josquin and Compère to their courts. Starting in the last decades of the century, Italian composers such as Marchetto Cara and Bartolomeo Tromboncino wrote light, courtly songs called frottole for the Mantuan court of Isabella d'Este. With the support of the Medici, the Florentine Mardi Gras season led to the creation of witty, earthy carnival songs called canti carnascialeschi.

== Renaissance era, 16th century ==
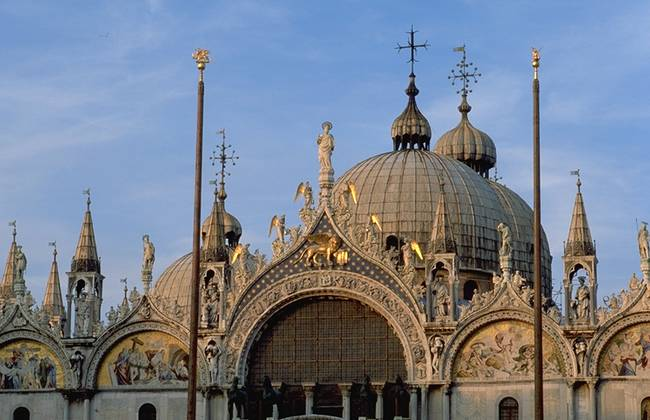
Saint Mark's in Venice. The spacious, resonant interior was one of the inspirations for the music of the Venetian School.

The 16th century saw the advent of printed polyphonic music and advances in instrumental music, which contributed to the international distribution of music characteristic of the Renaissance. In 1501, Ottaviano dei Petrucci published the Harmonice Musices Odhecaton, the first substantial collection of printed polyphonic music, and in 1516, Andrea Antico published the Frottole intablate da sonari organi, the earliest printed Italian music for keyboard. Italy became the primary center of harpsichord construction, violin production started in Cremona in the workshop of Andrea Amati, and lutenist Francesco Canova da Milano earned Italy an international reputation for virtuosic musicianship.

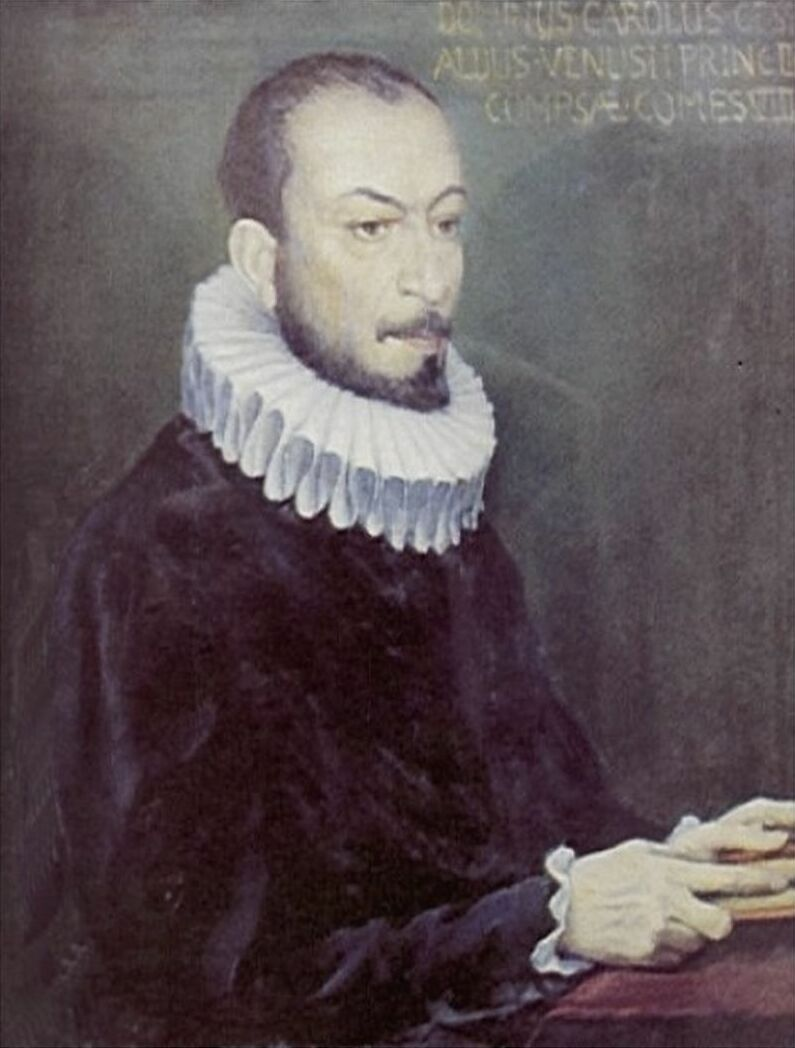
Carlo Gesualdo, Prince of Venosa

Music achieved new heights of cultural respectability. Castiglione's The Book of the Courtier recommended proficiency at music as a courtly virtue, and Santa Maria di Loreto, the first music conservatory, was built in Naples. Adrian Willaert developed music for double chorus at St. Mark's in Venice. This tradition of Venetian polychoral music would reach its height in the early baroque music of Giovanni Gabrieli. Unlike the earlier, simpler madrigals of the Trecento, madrigals of the 16th century were written for several voices, often by non-Italians brought into the wealthy northern courts. Madrigalists aspired to create high art, often using the refined poetry of Petrarchan sonnets, and utilizing musically sophisticated techniques such as text painting. Composers such as Cipriano de Rore and Orlando di Lasso experimented with increasing chromaticism, which would culminate in the mannerist music of Carlo Gesualdo. In 1558, Gioseffo Zarlino, the premier musical theorist of the period, wrote the Istitutioni harmoniche, which addressed such practical musical issues as invertible counterpoint. Lighter music was represented by the villanella, which originated in popular songs of Naples and spread throughout Italy.

Music was not immune to the politically charged atmosphere of Renaissance Italy. In 1559, Antonio Gardano published Musica nova, whose politically pro-republican partisan songs pleased the northern Italian republics and riled the Church. In 1562/1563, the third portion of the Council of Trent addressed issues of music in the Church. Most paraliturgical music, including all but four Sequences were banned. An outright ban on polyphonic music was debated behind the scenes, and guidelines were issued requiring that church music have clear words and a pure, uplifting style. Although the tales of Giovanni Pierluigi da Palestrina "rescuing" polyphony with the Missa Papae Marcelli are no longer accepted by scholars, Palestrina's music remains the paradigm of the musical aesthetic promoted by the Church. Shortly afterwards, in 1614, the Editio medicea (Medicean Edition) of Gregorian chant was released, rewriting the Gregorian chant repertory to purge it of perceived corruptions and barbarisms, and return it to a "purer" state closer in style to Palestrinian melodies.

In the late 16th century and early 17th century, composers began pushing the limits of the Renaissance style. Madrigalism reached new heights of emotional expression and chromaticism in what Claudio Monteverdi called his seconda pratica (second practice), which he saw originating with Cipriano de Rore and developing in the music of composers such as Luca Marenzio and Giaches de Wert. This music was characterized by increased dissonance and by sections of homophony, which led to such traits of the early baroque as unequal voices where the bass line drove the harmonies and the treble melody became more prominent and soloistic. This transitional period between the Renaissance and baroque included the development of the Sicilian polyphonic school in the works of Pietro Vinci, the first extant polyphony written by women, the fusion of Hebrew texts and European music in the works of Salomone Rossi, and the virtuosic women's music of Luzzasco Luzzaschi performed by the Concerto delle donne in Ferrara.

== Baroque era, 16th – 18th centuries ==
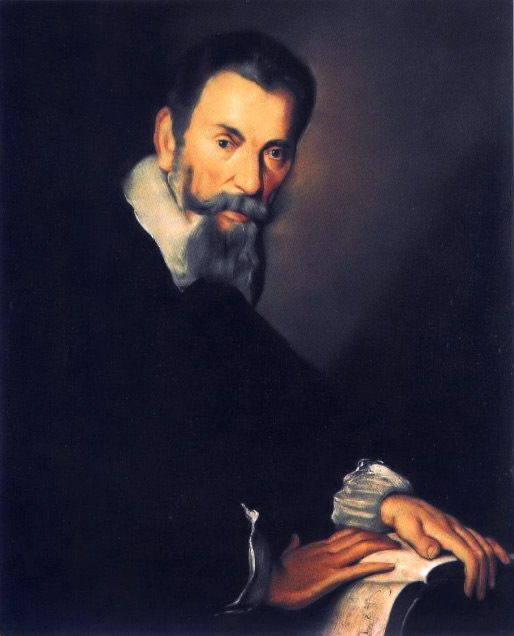
Claudio Monteverdi

The exact nature of ancient Greek musical drama is a matter of dispute. What is important, however, for the later development of Italian and European music is that poets and musicians of the Florentine Camerata in the late 16th century thought—in the words of one of them, Jacopo Peri—that the "ancient Greeks sang entire tragedies on the stage". Thus was born the musical version of the Italian Renaissance: paying tribute to classical Greece by retelling Greek myths within a staged musical context—the first operas. The works emerged in this period with relatively simple melodies and the texts about Greek mythology sung in Italian. (Opera may have deeper roots in the Tuscan maggio drammatico tradition. Three cities are especially important in this period in Italy: Venice, as the birthplace of commercial opera; Rome, for Palestrina's school of Renaissance polyphony; and Naples, as the birthplace of church-sponsored music conservatories. These conservatories evolved into training grounds, providing composers and musicians for Italy and, indeed, Europe as a whole. Claudio Monteverdi is considered the first great composer of the new musical form, opera, the person who turned Florentine novelty into a "unified musical drama with a planned structure."

The years 1600 to 1750 encompass the musical Baroque. A new dominance of melody within harmony at the expense of text led to great changes, including the expansion of instrumental resources of the orchestra. The keyboard was extended, and the making of stringed instruments by Antonio Stradivari became a great industry in Cremona. Instrumental music started to develop as a separate "track," quite apart from the traditional role of accompanying the human voice. Instrumental forms include such things as the sonata, symphony, and concerto. Important names in music within this period in Italy are Alessandro Scarlatti, and Antonio Vivaldi, representing the importance of Naples and Venice, respectively, within this period.

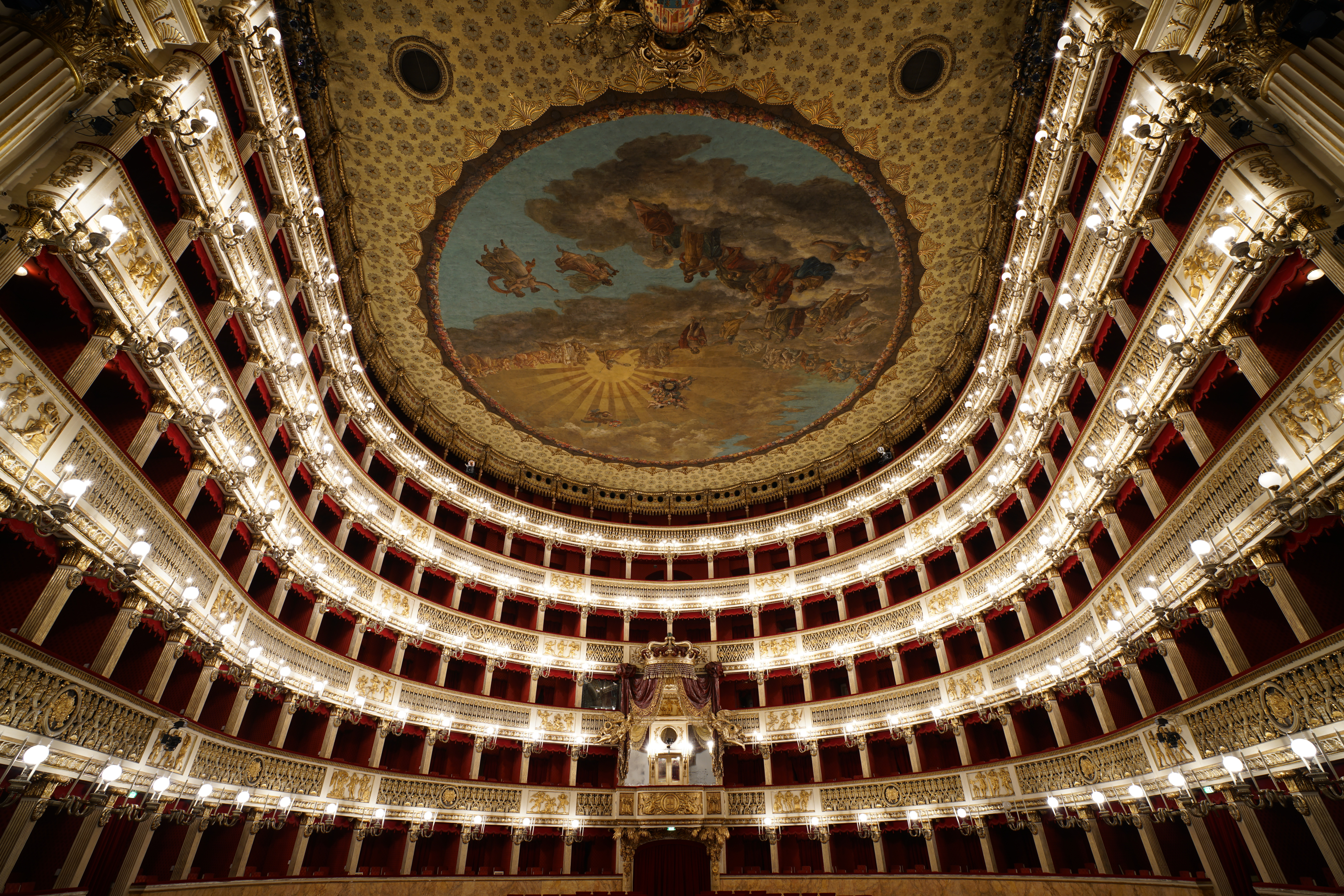
Teatro San Carlo, Naples

The physical resources for music advanced greatly during the 18th century. The great opera houses in Naples and Milan were built: the Teatro di San Carlo and La Scala, respectively. It is the age, as well, of the rise to prominence of the Neapolitan—and then Italian—Comic opera. Important, too, is the restoring of balance between text and music in opera, largely through the librettos of Pietro Trapassi, called Metastasio.

Important Italian composers in this century are: Domenico Scarlatti, Benedetto Marcello, Giovanni Battista Pergolesi, Niccolò Piccinni, Giovanni Paisiello, Luigi Boccherini, Domenico Cimarosa, and Luigi Cherubini. It is also the age in which Italian music became international, so to speak, with many Italian composers beginning to work abroad.

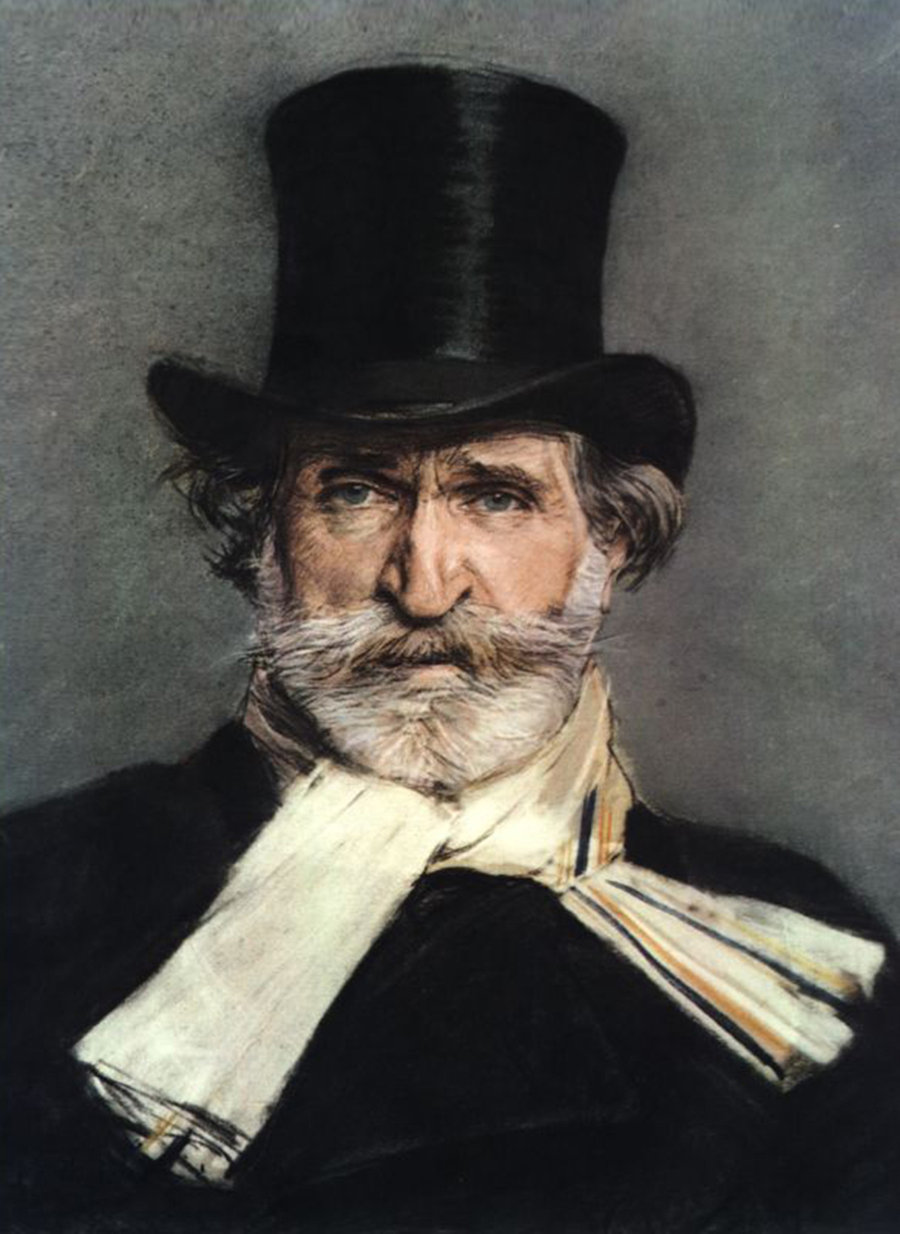
Giuseppe Verdi

== 19th century ==
The 19th century is the age of Romanticism in European literature, art, and music. Italian opera forsakes the Comic opera for the more serious fare of Italian lyric Romanticism. Although the generally light-hearted and ever-popular Rossini was certainly an exception to that, Italian music of the 19th century is dominated at the beginning by the likes of Bellini and Donizetti, giving to Italian music the lyrical melodies that have remained associated with it ever since. Then, the last fifty years of the century were dominated by Giuseppe Verdi, the greatest musical icon in Italian history. Verdi's music "sought universality within national character"; that is, much of what he composed in terms of historical themes could be related to his pan-Italian vision. Verdi was the composer of the Italian Risorgimento, the movement to unify Italy in the 19th century. Later in the century is also the time of the early career of Giacomo Puccini, perhaps the greatest composer of pure melody in the history of Italian music.

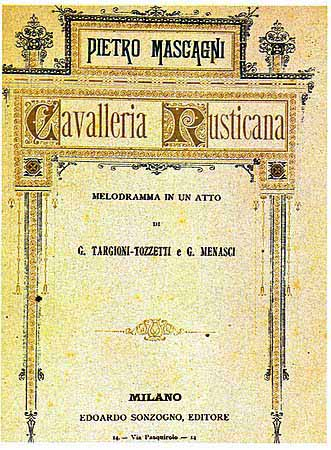
Frontispiece from the score of Cavalleria rusticana, a masterpiece of Italian Verismo from 1890

Perhaps the most noteworthy feature of Italian musical form in the 19th century, and that which distinguishes it from musical developments elsewhere, is that it remained primarily operatic. All significant Italian composers of the century wrote opera almost to the exclusion of other forms, such as the symphony. There are no Italian symphonists in this century, the way one might speak of Brahms in Germany, for example. Many Italian composers, however, did write significant sacred music, such as Rossini a Stabat Mater and his late Petite messe solennelle and Verdi Messa da Requiem and Quattro pezzi sacri.

Romanticism in all European music certainly held on through the start of the 20th century. In Italy, the music of Verdi and Puccini continued to dominate for a number of years. Even the realistic plots and more modern compositional techniques of the operas of Italian verismo, such as Mascagni's Cavalleria rusticana, did not greatly affect the extremely melodic nature of Italian music.
