= Timeline of Italian music =

Dates for musical periods such as Baroque, Classical, Romantic, etc. are somewhat arbitrary. All dates are CE.

== Early Christian era ==
c. 100 – c. 500: Early Christian era

- c. 230 — Alleluia melodies heard in Rome.
- 313 — The Roman Emperor Constantine issues the Edict of Milan, granting Roman Christians freedom to worship.
- 386 — St. Ambrose introduces vigils and popular psalmody in Milan.
- c. 425 — Pope Celestine I officially introduces the responsorial singing of a Gradual psalm in the Roman Mass.
- c. 425 — Cassian, Bishop of Brescia, adapts Egyptian monastic psalmody to Western usage.
- 476 — Rome falls to the Ostrogoths, which is often used to mark the beginning of the Middle Ages.
- c. 495 — Boethius writes the De institutione musica, which becomes the standard - if somewhat inaccurate - textbook on the Ancient Greek musical scales.

== Medieval music ==
- c. 500 – c. 1400 Italian Medieval Music.
- c. 530 — St. Benedict arranges the weekly order of monastic psalmody in his Rule.
- 530-609 — Venantius Fortunatus creates some of Christianity's most enduring hymns, including "Vexilla regis prodeunt," later the most popular hymn of the Crusades.
- 536 — Under Justinian's orders, Belisarius recaptures Rome from the Ostrogoths and reestablishes Byzantine rule in Italy. Northern Italy soon falls to the Lombards.
- 590-604 — Reign of Pope Gregory the Great, who reformed Church bureaucracy and unified the liturgy. Carolingian chant would later, somewhat misleadingly, be called Gregorian chant in his honor.
- c. 650 — The Roman schola cantorum, the trained papal choir, is founded.
- c. 700 — Pope Sergius I introduces the Agnus dei into the Roman Mass.
- early 8th century — The Roman Stational Mass is recorded, in which the Pope presided over Masses in a series of cities.
- 785-6 — At Charlemagne's request, Pope Hadrian I sends a papal sacramentary with Roman chant, which only includes certain major holy days, to the Carolingian court in Francia. Charlemagne assigns Alcuin the task of completing an official compendium of Roman chants for the whole year. This led to the introduction of Gallican elements into the Roman chant cycle, creating Carolingian chant, later called Gregorian chant.
- mid-9th century — Moslems invade Italy, taking Sicily and pressing as far north as Rome.
- 998 - Pope Gregory V requests a copy of the Reichenau sacramentary, typifying the collapse of the manuscript tradition in Italy and the power shift to the Ottonian Holy Roman Empire.
- 11th century — The first extant Ambrosian chants are written down. The Milanese chronicler Landulphus relates the tale that Charlemagne placed a Gregorian and an Ambrosian sacramentary side by side on an altar. When they both flew open together, it was a sign that both traditions were valid. Milanese chant is the only non-Gregorian chant tradition to survive in the West.
- 1014 — At his imperial coronation Mass, the German Holy Roman Emperor Henry II asks for the Credo to be sung, as was the custom in German Masses. This was the last of the ordinary chants to be added to the Roman Mass.
- c. 1020 — Guido d'Arezzo describes the musical staff, solmization, and the Guidonian hand in his Micrologus. This early form of do-re-mi created a technical revolution in the speed at which chants could be learned, memorized, and transmitted.
- 1058 — Pope Stephen IX outlaws the local Beneventan chant of Benevento and Montecassino.
- 1197-1250 — Frederick II, the last great Hohenstaufen Holy Roman Emperor and King of Sicily, encourages music at the Sicilian court. Sicily becomes a refuge for troubadours displaced by the Albigensian Crusade and a melting pot of Christian, Jewish, and Muslim musical styles.
- 13th century — The local chant tradition of Rome, which scholars now call Old Roman chant, gives way to Gregorian chant.
- 1209-29 — The Albigensian Crusade. Supposedly to attack Cathar heretics, it brought southern France under northern French control and crushed Occitan culture and language. Most troubadours fled, especially to Spain and Italy.
- c. 1250-1350 — Italian flagellants develop the Italian folk hymns known as spiritual laude.
- mid-13th century — Sordello of Mantua active as a trovatore, an Italian troubadour.
- 1265-1321 — Dante Alighieri. Dante champions the poetic use of the vernacular tongue. Strongly influenced by troubadour culture, he analyzed the troubadour verse forms, included troubadours and trovatori in the Divine Comedy, and strongly considered writing in Occitan rather than Tuscan.
- 1304-74 — The Italian poet Petrarch, whose poems were frequently set to music.
- 1317-c. 1319 — Marchettus of Padua writes major treatises on plainchant and polyphony, expounding a theory of rhythmic notation that paved the way for trecento (Italian ars nova) music.
- c. 1335 — The Rossi Codex, the earliest extant collection of Italian secular polyphony, and a major source of early trecento music, including examples of early madrigals, cacce, and ballate.
- c. 1360 — Death of Jacopo da Bologna, the first famous trecento composer.
- c. 1360 — The Ivrea Codex, a major source of late trecento music.
- c. 1397 — Death of Landini, the famous blind trecento composer, known for his characteristic "Landini cadence."
- c. 1411 — Death of Johannes Ciconia, the first northern European of stature to compose music in the Italian style. He synthesized the French and Italian styles, presaging the "international" music typical of the Renaissance.
- 1410-1415 — Compilation of the Squarcialupi Codex, the largest source of trecento music.

== Italian Renaissance music ==
- c. 1400 – c. 1600 Italian Renaissance Music.
  - c. 1420 – c. 1490 — Composition of polyphonic music enters a slow period. More great Italian performers than composers are known from this time. Rise of the influential d'Este and Medici political dynasties.
  - 1446 — Death of Leonardo Giustinian, noble performer and anthologist.
  - 1454–5 — The Peace of Lodi shifts the balance of power among the powerful families of northern Italy.
  - 1470s — Franco-Flemish composers such as Josquin and Compère are hired as professional musicians in the courts of Milan.
  - c. 1480 – c. 1520 — The light, courtly music known as the frottola flourishes in the Mantuan court of Isabella d'Este, composed by such composers as Marchetto Cara and Bartolomeo Tromboncino.
  - c. 1500 — The witty, earthy songs of the Florentine carnival, the canti carnascialeschi, are in vogue.
  - 1501 — Ottaviano dei Petrucci publishes the Odhecaton, the first substantial collection of printed polyphonic music.
  - 1516 — Andrea Antico publishes the earliest printed Italian music for keyboard.
  - 1525 — Giovanni Pierluigi da Palestrina born (d. 1594).
  - 1527-1562 — Adrian Willaert's tenure at St. Mark's in Venice, where he developed the Venetian tradition of music for double chorus.
  - 1528 — Castiglione's The Book of the Courtier recommends proficiency at music as a courtly virtue.
  - 1537 — Santa Maria di Loreto, the first music conservatory, is opened in Naples.
  - 1543 — Death of Francesco Canova da Milano, famous lutenist, and the first native Italian musician to achieve an international reputation.
  - mid-16th century — Italy is the premier center of harpsichord construction.
  - mid-16th century — The classic Italian madrigal thrives, though largely composed by non-Italians, frequently using Petrarchan sonnets and text painting. Lighter music is represented by the villanella, which originated in the popular song in Naples and spread throughout Italy.
  - 1550s — Composers such as Orlando di Lasso and Cipriano de Rore experiment with chromaticism.
  - 1558 — Gioseffo Zarlino publishes the Istitutioni harmoniche, the leading source of practical musical theory of the Renaissance, and the first music theory to seriously address invertible counterpoint.
  - 1559 — Antonio Gardano publishes Musica nova, whose politically pro-republican partisan songs please the northern Italian republics and rile the Church.
  - 1562-3 — The Council of Trent bans most paralitugical music, including all but four Sequences. A ban on all liturgical polyphony is debated, and music is required to have clear words and a pure, uplifting style.
  - 1564 — Violin production starts in Cremona in the workshop of Andrea Amati.
  - 1567 — Birth of Claudio Monteverdi
  - 1579 — Pietro Vinci, founder of the Sicilian polyphonic school, publishes his second book of madrigals.
  - 1580 — Vincenzo Galilei publishes Dialogo della Musica.
  - 1580-97 — The Concerto delle donne sing virtuosic women's choral music in the court of Ferrara under the direction of Luzzasco Luzzaschi.
  - 1585 — Founding in Rome of the musical confraternity that would become the Accademia Nazionale di Santa Cecilia.
  - 1590 — Monteverdi's first book of madrigals published, including "Ecco mormorar l'onde."
  - 1597 — Jacopo Peri's La Dafne, the "first opera", is staged at Palazzo Corsi in Florence.

== Baroque period ==
- c. 1600 – c. 1725 Italian Baroque Music.
  - 1605 — Claudio Monteverdi's fifth book of madrigals opens with a defense of the seconda pratica of Cipriano de Rore, Luca Marenzio, Giaches de Wert, and his own music, in which the music evokes stronger emotion through increasing use of dissonance and a stronger harmonic progression based on a more independent bass line, presaging the musical developments of the Baroque.
  - 1607 — Monteverdi's first opera, Orfeo.
  - 1611 — Carlo Gesualdo publishes his sixth book of madrigals, including the highly mannerist "Moro, lasso."
  - 1614 — The Editio medicea of Gregorian chant is published, rewriting the old modal chant according to the contemporary aesthetic style.
  - 1623 — Salomone Rossi publishes arrangements of The Song of Solomon using Hebrew texts and Italian polyphonic style.
  - 1637 — Europe's first opera house, the Teatro Tron, opens in Venice.
  - 1644 — Violin maker, Antonio Stradivari born (d. 1737).
  - 1660 — Birth of Alessandro Scarlatti (d. 1725).
  - 1709 — First fortepiano (modern piano) built by Bartolommeo Cristofori in Florence.
  - 1718 — Alessandro Scarlatti's The Triumph of Honour paves the way for Italian comic opera.
  - 1725 — Vivaldi's Four Seasons published.

== Classical music ==
- c. 1725 – c. 1825 Italian classical music and comic opera
  - 1737 — The Teatro di San Carlo opens in Naples.
  - 1753 — Pergolesi's La Serva Padrona (The Servant Mistress), plays in Paris and starts a continental rage for Italian comic opera.
  - 1760 — La Cecchina by Niccolò Piccinni, later praised by Verdi as the first true Italian comic opera.
  - 1778 — The Teatro alla Scala—La Scala—opens in Milan.
  - 1792 — Birth of G. Rossini (d. 1868).
  - 1797 — Birth of Gaetano Donizetti (d. 1848).
  - 1801 — Birth of Vincenzo Bellini (d. 1835).
  - 1813 — Birth of Giuseppe Verdi (d. 1901).
  - 1816 — Rossini's The Barber of Seville performed for the first time.

== Romantic music ==
- c. 1825 – 1900 Italian Romantic Music.
  - 1828 — Debut of violinist Paganini in Vienna.
  - 1829 — Rossini's last opera, William_Tell_(opera).
  - 1831 — Norma, opera by Bellini.
  - 1832 — Elisir d'amore, opera by Donizetti.
  - 1835 — First festival of the Canzone Napoletana, the Neapolitan song.
  - 1842 — Nabucco, Verdi's first successful opera.
  - 1847 — MacBeth, opera by G. Verdi.
  - 1858 — Birth of Giacomo Puccini (d. 1924).
  - 1886 — Otello, opera by G. Verdi.
  - 1890 — Cavalleria Rusticana, important realist opera by Pietro Mascagni.
  - 1896 — La Bohème, opera by Puccini.

== Modern era ==
=== 1900 – 1925 ===
- 1900 — Tosca, opera by Puccini.
- 1902 — Tenor Enrico Caruso, stung by criticism, leaves Italy for America.
- 1907 — Ferruccio Busoni publishes Sketches for a New Musical Aesthetic.
- 1914 — The Fountains of Rome, prominent orchestral piece by Ottorino Respighi.
- 1922 — Death of Alessandro Moreschi, last Vatican castrato singer.
- 1924 — Arturo Toscanini conducts Puccini's last opera Turandot at La Scala in Milan.
- 1925 — Italian radio starts to broadcast music programs.

=== 1950s ===
- 1951 — First San Remo Festival of Italian popular music.
- 1953 — First edition of the Ravello Festival.
- 1954 — Tarantella Napoletana, first Italian film musical.
- 1958 — First edition of Canzonissima, popular TV song festival; first edition of the Festival dei Due Mondi in Spoleto.

=== 1990s ===
- 1994 — The National Symphony Orchestra of the RAI (Italian Radio & Television) is formed, uniting the earlier orchestras of Torino, Milan, Rome and Naples. Based in Torino.
- 1996 — Founding of CEMAT (Federation of Italian Electroacoustic Music Centers), with the purpose of promoting the activity of Italian computer music research and production centers.

=== 2000s to now ===
- 2002 — Parco della Musica, a vast multi-auditorium musical venue, one of the largest in the world, opens in Rome.
