= Niccolò da Perugia =

Italian composer

Niccolò da Perugia (Niccolò del Proposto also spelled as Nicolò. Latin, Magister Sere Nicholaus Prepositi de Perugia) (fl. second half of the 14th century) was an Italian composer of the Trecento, the musical period also known as the "Italian ars nova". He was a contemporary of Francesco Landini, and apparently was most active in Florence.

== Life and career ==
Little is known for certain about his life; only a few biographical details are verifiable from extramusical sources. He was probably from Perugia, and may have been the son of the provost ("proposto") there. In 1362 he was listed as a visitor to the monastery of Santa Trinita along with Gherardello da Firenze. From the evidence of his music, he was probably a friend of the Florentine poet Franco Sacchetti, and must have done the bulk of his composing between 1360 and 1375, since those are the outside dates known for the poems he set. He may be the same as the Ser Niccolò recorded as a notable singer of laude in 1393. One of his compositions, La fiera testa, was likely written against the Visconti family when Florence was at war with Milan between 1397 and 1400; Niccolò may have been in Perugia then.

== Music ==
External audio
- Il megli' è pur tacere performed by the Sollazzo Ensemble
- Il megli' è pur tacere

A total of 41 compositions of Niccolò have survived with reliable attribution, the majority of them in the Squarcialupi Codex, and all the others from sources in Tuscany. All are secular, all are vocal, and they include 16 madrigals, 21 ballate, and 4 cacce. The madrigals are all for two voices, except for one which uses three, and all are in a relatively conservative style, uninfluenced by contemporary French practice (thereby differing from the similar works of Landini). Sacchetti's records of his poetry that was set to music includes the titles of several other pieces by Niccolò that do not survive.

One peculiarity of Niccolò was the genre of the tiny ballata, the 'ballatae minimae'. These pieces are very short, consisting of a single moralizing line of text, much different from the amorous love poetry set by other contemporary composers such as Landini.

== See also ==
- Music of the Trecento
