= Firenze (disambiguation) =

Firenze is the Italian name for the city of Florence and the Province of Florence.

Firenze may also refer to:

- Andrea da Firenze, an Italian composer
- Gherardello da Firenze, an Italian composer of the trecento
- Lorenzo da Firenze, an Italian composer and music teacher of the trecento
- Firenze (Harry Potter), a centaur in the Harry Potter series
- Firenze (horse), a racehorse
- 41 Infantry Division Firenze, an Italian infantry division of World War II
- Ezio Auditore da Firenze, the main protagonist of the Ezio Trilogy of Assassin's Creed games: Assassin's Creed II Assassin's Creed: Brotherhood and Assassin's Creed: Revelations
- "Firenze", a 2019 song by Jun.Q
- Oldsmobile Firenza, a compact car sold in North America from 1982 to 1988
- Vauxhall Firenza, a compact sold in the United Kingdom from 1970 to 1975
