= Music of the Trecento =

Period of Italian music in the 1300s

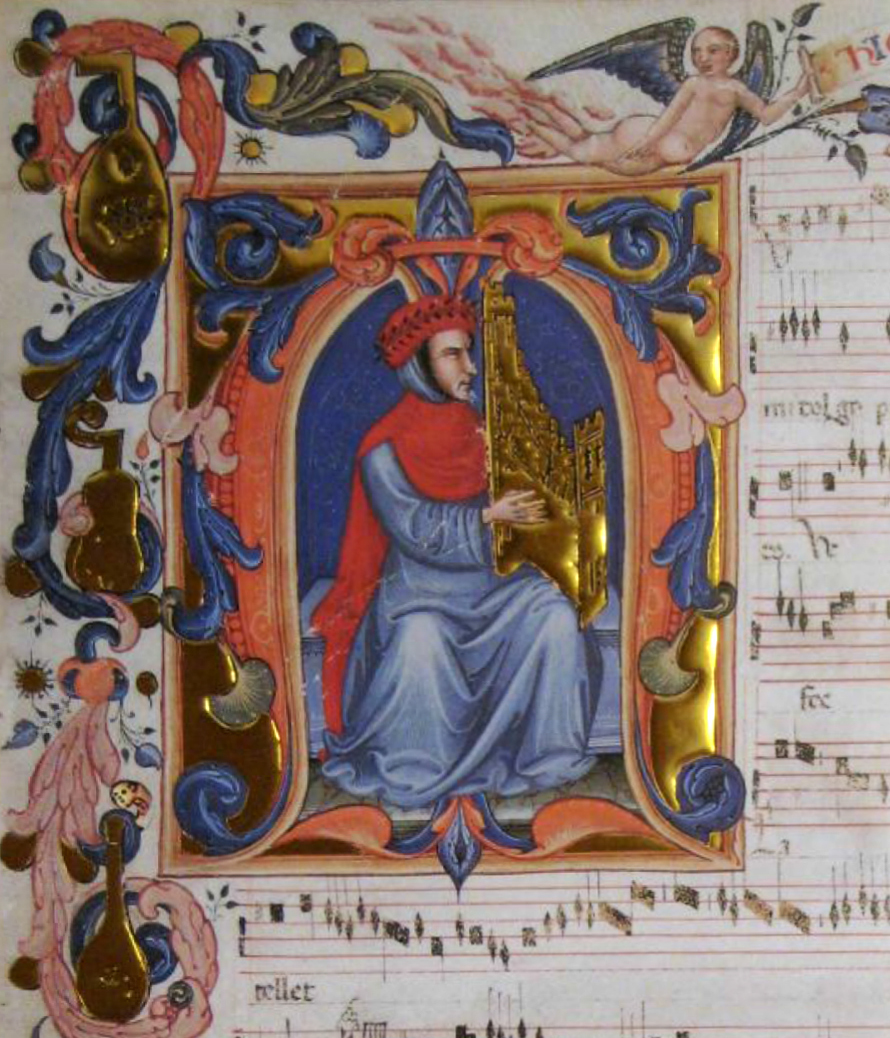
Francesco Landini, the most famous composer of the Trecento, playing a portative organ (illustration from the fifteenth-century Squarcialupi Codex)

The Trecento was a period of vigorous activity in Italy in the arts, including painting, architecture, literature, and music. The music of the Trecento paralleled the achievements in the other arts in many ways, for example, in pioneering new forms of expression, especially in secular song in the vernacular language, Italian. In these regards, the music of the Trecento may seem more to be a Renaissance phenomenon; however, the predominant musical language was more closely related to that of the late Middle Ages, and musicologists generally classify the Trecento as the end of the medieval era. Trecento means "three hundred" in Italian but is usually used to refer to the 1300s. However, the greatest flowering of music in the Trecento happened late in the century, and the period is usually extended to include music up to around 1420.

== History ==
=== Background and early history (to 1330) ===
Little newly composed Italian music remains from the 13th century, so the immediate antecedents of the music of the Trecento must largely be inferred. The music of the troubadors, who brought their lyrical, secular song into northern Italy in the early 13th century after they fled their home regions—principally Provence—during the Albigensian Crusade, was a strong influence, and perhaps a decisive one; many of the Trecento musical forms are closely related to those of the troubadours of more than a century before. Another influence on Trecento music was the conductus, a type of polyphonic sacred music which had the same text sung in all parts; texturally, Trecento secular music is more like the conductus than anything else that came before, although the differences are also striking, and some scholars (for example, Hoppin) have argued that the influence of the conductus has been overstated.

Some of the poetry of Dante Alighieri (1265–1321) was set to music at the time it was written, but none of the music has survived. One of the musicians to set Dante's poetry was his friend Casella (died 1299 or 1300), memorialized in Canto II of Purgatorio. Poems of Dante set by others included canzoni and ballate; if they were similar to the other earliest ballate, they would have been monophonic.

Though the pioneering music theory of Marchetto da Padova was written in this early period, the influence of his treatise on notation, the Pomerium, is largely seen in the manuscripts of the succeeding generations. Marchetto, building on (or in parallel with) the innovations of Petrus de Cruce, described a system of division of the breve into 2, 3, 4, 6, 8, 9, or 12 semibreves (later minims) with dots (singular punctus divisionis) indicating breaks at the end of a breve (however, Marchetto never used a term "punctus divisionis"). Although more Trecento music is written in the international system of notation descended from Franco of Cologne and Philippe de Vitry than in the Marchettian system (and there exist a few, mostly instrumental, works not of Italian origin that use the Marchettian system), nonetheless, Marchetto's contribution to rhythmic notation is so connected with the Italian Trecento that it is often referred to as simply, "Italian Notation."

=== Birth of the Trecento style (1330–1360) ===
Much of the earliest polyphonic secular vocal music of the Trecento to survive is found in the Rossi Codex and includes music by the first generation of composers to craft a uniquely Italian style. Though many works of this generation are anonymous, many works are attributed to one Maestro Piero and Giovanni da Cascia. Other composers of the first generation include Vincenzo da Rimini and Jacopo da Bologna, though they may be of the later end of this generation and are sometimes considered a second generation. All of these composers were associated with aristocratic courts in the north of Italy, especially Milan and Verona. Some extremely obscure names survive in later sources, such as Bartolo da Firenze (fl. 1330–1360), who may have been the first Italian composer to write a polyphonic mass movement in Trecento style: a setting of the Credo.

The two most common forms of early Trecento secular music were the two-voice madrigal and monophonic ballata. Some three-voice madrigals survive from the earlier periods, but the form most associated with three-voice writing was the rarer caccia, a canonic form with onomatopoeic exclamations and texts that make reference to hunting or feasting. While some of their music was still monophonic, much was for two voices, and Jacopo da Bologna wrote a few madrigals for three voices. Jacopo also wrote one surviving motet.

=== Florentine music in the mid-to-late fourteenth century (1350–1390) ===
The center of secular musical activity moved south in mid-century, to Florence, which was the cultural center of the early Renaissance. Characteristic of the next generation of composers, most of them Florentine, was a preference for the ballata, a form which seems to have exploded into popularity around mid-century and became a polyphonic form. Like the closely related French virelai, the ballata has two sections and the form AbbaA. In the Decameron, Giovanni Boccaccio tells how in 1348, the year the Black Death ravaged Florence, members of a group of friends gathered to tell stories and sing ballate to instrumental accompaniment. While Boccaccio mentioned no composers by name, many of the Florentine musicians whose names have come down to us were in their early careers at this time.

By far the most famous composer of the entire Trecento, Francesco Landini (born ca. 1325–35, d. 1397), is generally considered a member of this generation, even if there is evidence that he was already active during the precedent generation. He was close to Petrarch. Francesco wrote 141 surviving ballate, but only 12 madrigals; his compositions appear in sources from throughout Italy. Other composers of this group besides Landini included Gherardello da Firenze, Lorenzo da Firenze, and Donato da Cascia. In this generation of composers, influence from (or exchange with) French music was becoming apparent in the secular work of the native Italians. Greater independence of voices was characteristic of the music of this generation, and points of imitation are common; in addition, the uppermost voice is often highly ornamented. Francesco's music was particularly admired for its lyricism and expressive intensity: his fame has endured for six hundred years, and numerous modern recordings exist of his work.

=== Trecento music during the Great Schism (1378–1417) ===
The last generation of composers of the era included Niccolò da Perugia, Bartolino da Padova, Andrea da Firenze, Paolo da Firenze, Matteo da Perugia, and Johannes Ciconia, the first member of the group who was not a native Italian. Though the principal form remained the ballata, a resurgence of the madrigal shows an interest in earlier music. This interest is accompanied by renewed interest in purely Italian notation. In many works by the newest generation the ornamentation of the parts is considerably less than in the music of the preceding group of composers, while other compositions are as ornamented as any in the earlier Trecento. Text-painting is evident in some of their music: for example, some of their programmatic compositions include frank imitations of bird calls or various dramatic effects.

Ciconia, as a Netherlander, was one of the first of the group which was to dominate European music for the next two hundred years; early in his life, he spent time in Italy learning the lyrical secular styles. Ciconia was also a composer of sacred music and represents a link with the Burgundian school, the first generation of Netherlanders which dominated the early and middle 15th century. Ciconia spent most of his Italian years in cities of northern Italy, particularly Padua, where he died in 1412.

Another late 14th-century composer, probably active in Rome, Abruzzo, and Teramo, was Antonio Zachara da Teramo. While a chronology of his music still has debated points, it seems that his earlier music survives in the Squarcialupi Codex. These's works conventional style is indebted to that of Francesco Landini; Zachara's later music borrows from the style of the Avignon-centered Ars subtilior, and indeed, he seems to have supported the antipopes during the split of the papacy after the end of the century, going to Bologna around 1408.

The late Trecento also saw the rising importance of sacred music, particularly polyphonic Mass movements and Latin motets (both sacred and dedicatory). Though it was long thought that sacred music's role in the Trecento was small, thanks to many new discoveries over the past forty years, it now represents a significant percentage of the total output of the Trecento. Ciconia and Zachara play dominant roles in Mass composition, and their sacred music reached England, Spain, and Poland.

The end of the period of the Schism also marked the end of the dominance of Florence over Italian music; while it always maintained an active musical life, it would be replaced by Venice (and other centers in the Veneto), Rome, Ferrara and other cities in the coming centuries and never again regained the pre-eminent position it attained in the 14th century.

=== Instrumental music ===
Instrumental music was widespread, but relatively few notated examples have survived. Indeed, while contemporary depictions of singers often show them performing from books or scrolls, paintings and miniatures of instrumentalists never show written music. The main keyboard collection is the Faenza Codex (Faenza, Biblioteca Comunale, ms. 117). Other small sources of keyboard music appear in codices in Padua (Archivio di Stato 553), Assisi (Biblioteca Comunale 187), and in one section of the Reina Codex (Paris, Bibliothèque Nationale de France, n. a. fr. 6771). The typical keyboard style of the time seems to have placed the tenor of a secular song or a melody from plainchant in equal tones in the bass while a fast-moving line was written above it for the right hand. The surviving sources are likely among the few witnesses of a largely improvised tradition.

Other instrumental traditions are hinted at by the monophonic dances without text in a manuscript now in London (British Library, add. 29987) and in imitations of instrumental style in sung madrigals and cacce such as Dappoi che'l sole.

Instruments used during the Trecento included the vielle, lute, psaltery, flute, and portative organ (Landini is holding one in the illustration). Trumpets, drums (especially paired drums called nakers), and shawms were important military instruments.

== Overall musical characteristics of the era ==
Music of the Trecento retained some characteristics of the preceding age and were antecedents of the Renaissance in others.

Consonances were unison, fifth and octave, just as in the ars antiqua, and the interval of a third was usually treated as a dissonance, especially earlier in the period. Parallel motion in unison, fifths, octaves, thirds, and occasionally fourths was used in moderation. Composers used passing tones to avoid parallel intervals, creating brief harsher dissonances, foreshadowing the style of counterpoint developed in the Renaissance. After 1350, there was increased use of triads in three-part writing, giving the music, to a modern ear, a tonal feeling. Accidentals occurred more frequently in music of the Trecento than in music of earlier eras; in particular, there was use of F♯, C♯, G♯, B♭, and E♭. One A♭ occurs in the works of Landini.

The Landini cadence or under-third cadence, is a cadence involving the melodic drop from the seventh to the sixth before going up again to the octave. Modern scholars have named the cadence after Landini because of its frequent use in his music. It can be found in most of the music from the 1360s onward until well into the mid-1400s (for instance, in the songs of Guillaume Du Fay).

== Music sources ==
Madrigal Cum altre ucele
Anonymous composer, instrumental version. Source: Rossi Codex

Most of the manuscript sources of Trecento music are from late in the fourteenth or early in the 15th century: some time removed from the composition of the works themselves. The earliest substantial manuscript source of Trecento music is the Rossi Codex, which was compiled sometime between 1350 and 1370 and contains music from the earlier portion of the era. However, other small manuscript sources have been found that expand our knowledge of earlier Trecento repertories. These include the Mischiati fragments of Reggio Emilia, which contain several unique cacce. Other early sources contain sacred repertories. Two folios of Oxford Canon. Misc. 112 preserve a motet by Marchetto da Padova. Further motets are found on the fragment at Venice, San Giorgio Maggiore. The source Perugia Bib. Univ. Inv. 15755 N.F. was claimed to be from 1349 to 1354 according to its discoverers, but this date has been strongly disputed, and scholarly consensus is building that the manuscript is no earlier than other sources commonly dated to the 1390s. Still, this episode reflects the difficulties and uncertainties of dating all Trecento sources.

Most of the later large sources stem from the area around Florence. Probably the oldest of the larger sources is the Panciatichi Codex (Florence, Biblioteca Nazionale Centrale di Firenze, Panciatichiano 26). The largest and most beautiful Trecento source is undoubtedly the brilliantly illuminated Squarcialupi Codex, compiled in the early 15th century, which, with 352 compositions (including 145 by Landini), is one of the largest music sources of the time from any region. The Reina Codex, "Pit." (Paris, Bibliothèque Nationale de France, ital. 568), the London Codex (British Library, Add. Ms 29987), and the Lucca/Mancini Codex are the other largest legible sources of Trecento music. The palimpsest, San Lorenzo 2211, discovered in the 1980s, has also been the subject of much scholarship though it was largely illegible before ultraviolet and multispectral imaging made it possible to read most pages.

Scholarship before 2000 tended to regard the Ars subtilior sources Modena A and the Chantilly Codex, as well as the mass/motet manuscript Ivrea 115, as Italian copies of lost French sources and thus not particularly connected to Trecento music. This view has eroded in the twenty-first century and discussions of Trecento sources nearly always include at least some of these manuscripts.

Substantial fragmentary manuscript sources from Padua, Cividale del Friuli, and from the area around Milan point to these areas as substantial areas of manuscript production as well.

Non-Italian sources of music securely from Trecento Italy are rare. Polish sources, such as Warsaw 378 and the Krasiński Codex, preserve Mass music of Zachara da Teramo and Johannes Ciconia. A single piece by Zachara also appears in the Old Hall Manuscript.

== See also ==
- Category:Trecento composers
