= Maestro Piero =

Italian composer

Maestro Piero (Magister Piero or Piero) (born before 1300, died shortly after 1350) was an Italian composer of the late medieval era. He was one of the first composers of the Trecento who is known by name, and probably one of the oldest. He is mainly known for his madrigals.

== Life ==
No details are known of his life other than what can be inferred from his music, and from an illustration which probably contains his picture. He is depicted as a man of 50–60 years old in a Bolognese illustration from the first half of the 14th century, so he was probably born before 1300. Unlike many of the Trecento composers, he was not a Florentine, since he does not appear in the chronicle by Filippo Villani, which includes all of the musicians active there throughout the 14th century. Piero was possibly from Assisi, and is known to have been in Milan and Verona, employed by the Visconti and della Scala families, respectively; in addition, he may have been in Padua with Antonio della Scala before going to Verona, along with composer Giovanni da Cascia (Giovanni da Firenze). He was also associated with composer Jacopo da Bologna during this period, and the three composers appear to have engaged in a contest to set the same madrigal text, effectively forming a madrigal cycle: the date of this contest was in or after 1349, very near the end of Piero's life. There is no trace of any activity by Piero, or Giovanni da Cascia, after 1351; one or both composers may have died in the Black Death which swept through northern Italy during this time.

== Music and influence ==
A total of eight compositions by Piero have survived, plus two more cacce which have been attributed to him based on stylistic similarities. All eight are secular pieces: six madrigals, and two cacce. All eight of the attributed compositions are preserved in the Biblioteca Nazionale in Florence. Two of his works are preserved in the Rossi Codex.

Piero's madrigals are the earliest surviving works in that form which are canonic. The madrigals are for two voices, and the two cacce are for three; what distinguishes his work from that of his contemporaries is his frequent use of canon, especially in the ritornello passages in his madrigals. Piero's works clearly show the evolution of the three-voice canonic caccia form from the madrigal, in which the canonic portion of the madrigal became a two-voice canon, over a tenor, characteristic of the caccia.

== Works ==
=== Two-voice madrigals and caccia-madrigals ===
1. All'ombra d'un perlaro
2. Cavalcando con un giòvine
3. Ogni diletto
4. Quando l'àire comença
5. Sì com'al canto
6. Sovra un fiume regale

=== Cacce (three voices) ===
1. Con brachi assai
2. Con dolce brama

== See also ==
- Music of the Trecento
