= Donato da Cascia =

Italian composer

Donato and his music in the Squarcialupi Codex

Donato da Cascia (also da Firenze or da Florentia) (fl. c. 1350 – 1370) was an Italian composer of the Trecento. All of his surviving music is secular, and the largest single source is the Squarcialupi Codex. He was probably also a priest, and the picture that survives of him in the Squarcialupi Codex shows him in the robes of the Benedictine order.

Nothing at all is known about his life except what can be inferred from his picture, his name, and the geographic distribution of his surviving music. He was probably from Cascia, near Florence, and all of his music, with one exception (the virelai), is found in sources in Tuscany.

Seventeen compositions by Donato survive, including: fourteen madrigals, one caccia, one virelai, and one ballata. Except for one piece, his music is all for two voices, typical of mid-century practice in that regard, but unusually virtuosic; according to Nino Pirrotta, it "represents the peak of virtuoso singing in the Italian madrigal, and therefore in the Italian Ars nova as a whole."

Donato's madrigals usually feature an upper voice part which is more elaborate than the lower, and often use imitation between the two voices, though usually the imitative passages are short. In addition, he uses repeated words and phrases, often with a humorous intent; the influence of the caccia is evident in this device. Jacopo da Bologna was probably an influence on his work, as can be seen in the single-voiced transitional passages between different verses of the madrigals, typical of Jacopo.

== See also ==
- Music of the Trecento

== Notes ==
1. N. Pirrotta: The Music of Fourteenth Century Italy, 5 vols, 1954-1964, Vol 3., p. ii. (Quoted in Hoppin)
