= Antonio Squarcialupi =

Italian organist and composer

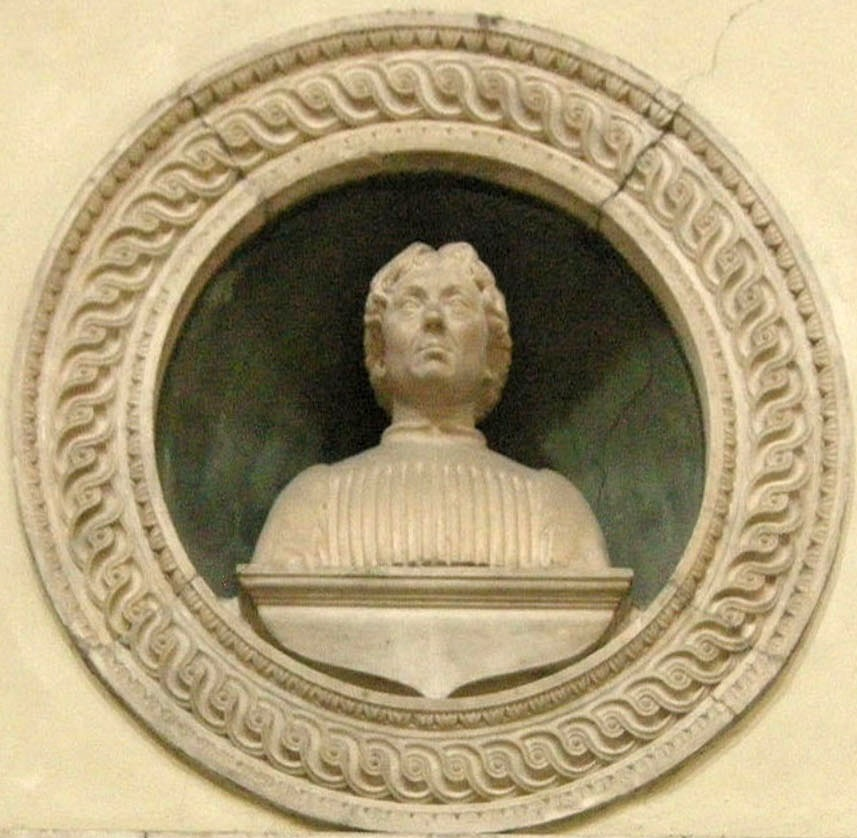
- Portrait bust in the Duomo of Florence, about 1490
- Born: 27 March 1416; Florence, Republic of Florence
- Died: 6 July 1480 (aged 64); Florence
- Burial place: Basilica of San Lorenzo, Florence
- Monuments: portrait bust and inscription in the Duomo of Florence
- Other names: Antonio degli Organi; Antonio del Bessa; Antonio di Bartolomeo del Bessa; Antonio di Bartolomeo del Besso; Antonio Organista; Antonius de Squarcialupis
- Occupations: organist; composer
- Father: Bartolomeo di Giovanni

Antonio Squarcialupi (27 March 1416 – 6 July 1480) was a Florentine organist and composer. He was the most famous organist in Italy in the mid-15th century.

== Life ==
He was born in Florence to a butcher named Bartolomeo with the family name of Giovanni; however he took the name of Squarcialupi, a well-known family from Tuscany, by mid-century, possibly to disguise his less than aristocratic origins. Most of his early life must have been spent in Florence, and he likely studied with both organist Giovanni Mazzuoli (also called Jovannes de Florentia, who was a pupil of Francesco Landini), as well as Matteo di Pagolo da Prato.

He acquired the post of organist at the Orsanmichele in Florence in 1431, but only remained there for two years, moving instead to the cathedral of Santa Maria del Fiore, at which post he remained for the rest of his life. He has been honored with a bust in this church.

== Music and influence ==
Squarcialupi was part of the court of Lorenzo de' Medici, and was also a colleague of Guillaume Dufay; there are numerous laudatory references to him in the middle of the 15th century, some, for instance that of diarist Luca Landucci, comparing him in stature to figures such as the sculptor Donatello. Evidently he was quite close to Lorenzo, and this is mentioned in his epitaph in Florence Cathedral.

None of his music has survived. His principal fame in music history, aside from his fame as an organist, is to have given his name to the splendid Squarcialupi Codex, a document he owned (but did not compile), and which is the richest source of music from Italy of the 14th century.
