= Paolo da Firenze =

Italian composer

Paolo da Firenze (Paolo Tenorista, "Magister Dominus Paulas Abbas de Florentia") (c. 1355 – after September 20, 1436) was an Italian composer and music theorist of the late 14th and early 15th centuries, the transition from the musical Medieval era to the Renaissance. More surviving music of the Trecento is attributable to Paolo than to any other composer except for Francesco Landini.

== Life ==
Paolo was born in Florence; his father's name was Marco. He was most likely from a humble family. He had three brothers. When he resigned as abbot on June 16, 1433 he was seventy-eight years old, giving his approximate birth year as 1355.

He became a Benedictine around 1380, and the portrait of him in the Squarcialupi Codex shows him in a Benedictine black cassock. On March 8, 1401 he took the post of abbot at S. Martin al Pino. Before 1417 he became the rector at Orbetello, a post he probably retained until around 1427. In the first decade of the 15th century, probably close to 1410, while in Florence, he supervised the compilation of Squarcialupi Codex, the single most important source of music in Italy in the 14th century.

Paolo died in Florence. Since his will was dated September 21, 1436, he either died on that date or later, at an extremely advanced age (eighty-one) for the time.

== Music and influence ==
Most of Paolo's music was published in modern editions in the 1970s, making it easily available, and as a result he has received more than the usual amount of critical attention. His music had both progressive and conservative aspects. While most of his surviving music is secular, and all of it vocal, two sacred compositions (a Benedicamus Domino for two voices, and a Gaudeamus omnes in Domino for three) have also survived. How much is lost is impossible to guess, but the 14th century saw an explosion of interest in notated secular music in Italy, and the proportional survival of his secular to sacred work may well represent the actual trend.

His secular compositions are of three types: thirteen madrigals, forty-six ballate (some of which are fragmentary, and others of which have the ascription to Paolo erased in the source), and five miscellaneous secular songs. All of his music is for two or three voices, and all is datable through sources or stylistic features to the period before 1410. Whether he did any composing after 1410 is not known.

The most puzzling question about any source of Paolo's music is the presence in the Squarcialupi Codex, the compilation of which he probably supervised, of thirty-two pages, all with his name on the top, his portrait in the front, and containing nothing but empty staves. It has been suggested that his music was not available by the deadline for completion; but yet the blank pages remain. Hoppin (p. 466) suggests that Paolo actually was outside of Florence when the manuscript was compiled, in the service of Cardinal Angelo II Acciaioli, and this may account for the missing music.

Paolo's madrigals combine Italian and French notation, and show considerable influence of the Avignon mannerist school of the ars subtilior in their complex and intricate rhythmic patterns; however most of them are for only two voices, a conservative choice. The ballate are more progressively done overall; most are for three voices, and are lyrical, melodic, but yet use some of the extreme rhythmic intricacies of the ars subtilior school. The influence of Landini, hard to avoid for any Florentine composer late in the 14th century, is evident both in the madrigals and the ballate.

== See also ==
- Music of the Trecento
