= Gloria Rose =

Musicologist of Italian cantata and early modern opera

Gloria Donington (née Rose) (b.1933-d.1974, aged 40) was an American musicologist of the early modern Italian cantata (primarily 17th century).

== Biography ==
Rose attended Hunter College in New York, graduating magna cum laude in 1953. She was nominated by her classmates for a citation of achievement as an outstanding graduate. Rose was also successful in attaining a number of awards while a university student, including the Italian Government Scholarship, a scholarship from the AAUW (American Association of University Women), a Fulbright scholarship, the Donald Tovey Memorial Prize from the University of Oxford for her potential in musicology, the National Endowment for the Humanities (NEH), and Howard Foundation Fellowship. She then went on to complete a PhD at Yale University, graduating in 1960 with her dissertation titled The Cantatas of Carissimi. It was during her studies at Yale when Rose also worked as research assistant to musicologist Leo Schrade, as well as music librarian at Wellesley College from 1958 to 1960. Upon graduating, Rose attained a teaching position as Assistant Professor in musicology at the University of Pittsburgh. Here, she met her husband, Robert Donington, who was an Andrew Mellow Visiting Professor at the University of Pittsburgh at the time. They moved together to New York in 1972, shortly before her death, after Rose and Donington both attained teaching positions at SUNY (now the University of Buffalo), Rose holding a visiting lectureship. There is a photograph of them together, with Rose sat at a harpsichord and Donington with a bass viol da gamba, in University of Buffalo library archive.

Rose died suddenly in 1974 at 40 years old in Buffalo, New York.

In 1976, two years after her death, her research materials were acquired by the Music Library of the University of Birmingham, where they remain today.

== Music career ==
Rose specialised in the chamber cantatas of Giacomo Carissimi and is still considered a “leading scholar on the cantata form”. She also wrote on Bach, Purcell, thorough-bass and the book trade. Rose married Robert Donington, a British musicologist of early music and gambist, in 1963.

== Published works ==
- The Cantatas of Carissimi (diss., Yale U., 1960)
- ‘The Cantatas of Giacomo Carissimi’, MQ, 48 (1962), 204–15
- ‘Agazarri and the Improvising Orchestra’, JAMS, 18 (1965), 382–93
- ‘Pietro Reggio, a Wandering Musician’, ML, 46 (1965), 207–16
- Giacomo Carissimi (1605–1674), WECIS, 5 (1966)
- ‘Purcell, Michelangelo Rossi and J.S. Bach: Problems of Authorship’, AcM, 40 (1968), 203–19
- ‘Two Operas by Scarlatti Recovered’, MQ, 68 (1972), 420–35
- ‘Cantata, La’, RicordiE
- ‘The Italian Cantata of the Baroque Period’, Gattungen der Musik in Einzeldarstellungen: Gedenkschrift Leo Schrade, ed. W. Arlt and others (Berne, 1973), 655–77
