= Mazzuoli =

Mazzuoli may refer to:

- Mazzuoli (family), an Italian family of artists from Umbria and Tuscany
- Mazzuoli (surname), Italian surname

== See also ==
- Mazzoli
