= Marzoli =

Marzoli is an Italian surname. Notable people with the surname include:

- Ruggero Marzoli (born 1976), Italian professional road bicycle racer
- Samuele Marzoli (born 1984), Italian former professional road and track cyclist

== See also ==
- Mazzoli
