= Squarcialupi Codex =

Fifteenth-century musical manuscript in Florence

- Biblioteca Medicea Laurenziana, Florence
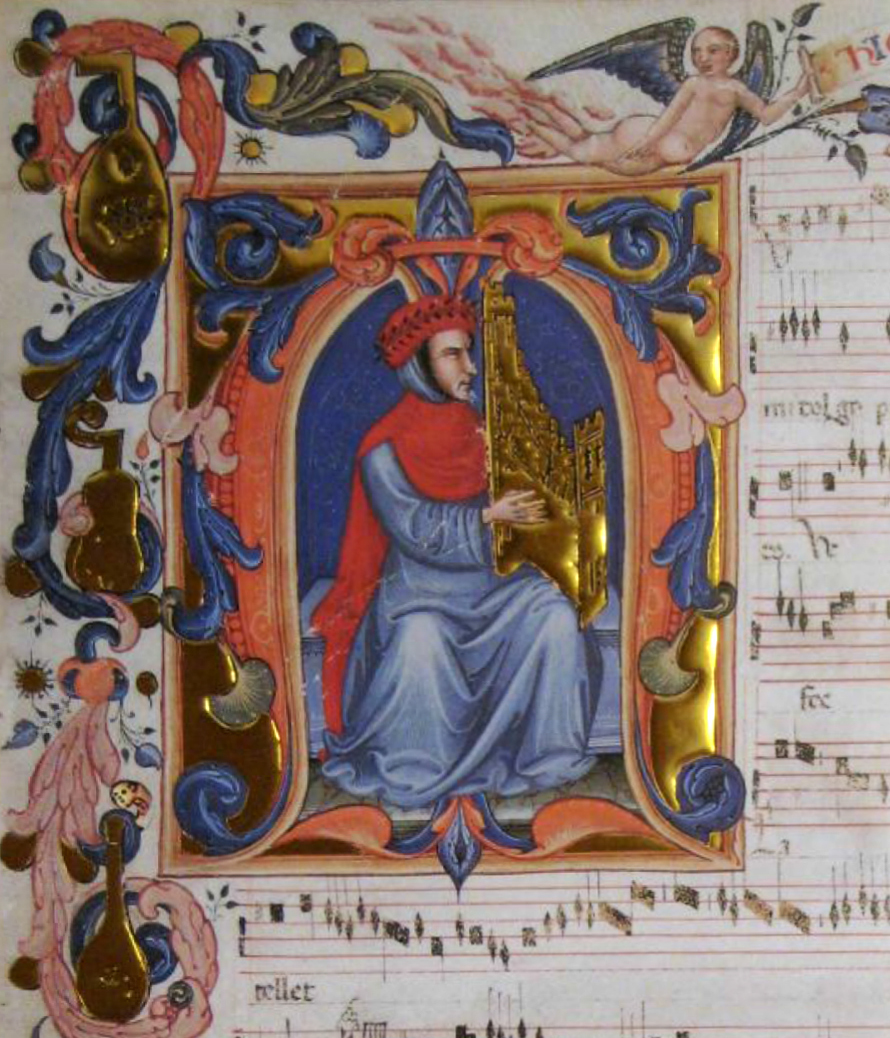
- Illustration showing Francesco Landini playing a portative organ
- Also known as: Codex Squarcialupi
- Type: codex
- Date: approximately 1410–1415
- Place of origin: Florence
- Language: volgare
- Authors: Giovanni da Cascia; Jacopo da Bologna; Gherardello da Firenze; Vincenzo da Rimini; Lorenzo da Firenze; Donato da Firenze; Niccolò da Perugia; Bartolino da Padova; Francesco Landini; Egidius and Guilielmus de Francia; Zacara da Teramo; Andrea da Firenze
- Illuminated by: Lorenzo Monaco and circle
- Material: parchment
- Previously kept: Antonio Squarcialupi; Raffaello Bonamici, his nephew; Giuliano di Lorenzo de' Medici; Biblioteca Palatina
- Accession: Mediceo Palatino 87

The Squarcialupi Codex (Florence, Biblioteca Medicea Laurenziana, MS Mediceo Palatino 87) is an illuminated manuscript compiled in Florence in the early fifteenth century. It is named for the noted fifteenth-century organist Antonio Squarcialupi, who owned it.

It is the single largest primary source of secular polyphonic music of the Trecento – the Italian ars nova – and contains the largest surviving collection of the compositions of Francesco Landini. The illuminated portraits of the musicians are attributed to Lorenzo Monaco and his circle. It is not known by whom, for what purpose, nor under whose patronage the compilation was made.

== The manuscript ==
It consists of 216 parchment folios, organized by composer, with each composer's section beginning with a portrait of the composer richly illuminated in gold, red, blue and purple. The manuscript is in good condition, and musical pieces are complete. Included in the codex are 146 complete pieces by Francesco Landini, 37 by Bartolino da Padova, 36 by Niccolò da Perugia, 29 by Andrea da Firenze, 28 by Jacopo da Bologna, 17 by Lorenzo da Firenze, 16 by Gherardello da Firenze, 15 by Donato da Cascia, 12 pieces by Giovanni da Cascia, 6 by Vincenzo da Rimini, and smaller amounts of music by others. It contains 16 blank folios, intended for the music of Paolo da Firenze, since they are labeled as such and include his portrait; the usual presumption by scholars is that Paolo's music was not ready at the time the manuscript was compiled, since he was away from Florence until 1409. There is also a section marked out for Giovanni Mazzuoli which contains no music.

The manuscript was almost certainly compiled in Florence at the monastery of Santa Maria degli Angeli, probably in about 1410–1415. Because the same unidentified family seal appears on the first folio of the manuscript and on the portrait page of Paolo da Firenze, it was long suggested that Paolo may have had some part in supervising the effort or have been part of the family that commissioned the manuscript. However, more recent evidence about the biography and in particular poor finances of Paolo has his connection to financing the manuscript unlikely. The manuscript was owned by renowned organist Antonio Squarcialupi in the middle of the 15th century, then by his nephew, and then passed into the estate of Giuliano di Lorenzo de' Medici, who gave it to the Biblioteca Palatina in the early 16th century. At the end of the 18th century, it passed into the ownership of the Biblioteca Medicea Laurenziana.

The first folio in the codex states: "This book is owned by Antonio di Bartolomeo Squarcialupi, organist of Santa Maria del Fiore." On the following pages, added later, are humanistic poems in praise of Squarcialupi.

All of the compositions in the codex are secular songs in the volgare, the predecessor of Italian. There are 227 ballate, 115 madrigals and 12 cacce, making 354 in all; 150 of the pieces are unica, found in no other source. They can be dated to the period from 1340 to 1415. Notably absent are Italian pieces by Johannes Ciconia, a northerner transplanted into Italy.
