= Vincenzo da Rimini =

Italian composer

Vincenzo da Rimini, also Magister Dominus Abbas de Arimino, L’abate Vincençio da Imola, Frate Vincenço, was an Italian composer of the medieval era, active in the middle of the 14th century.

== Life and career ==
All of the biographical details concerning Vincenzo's life are circumstantial. Rimini is a city near Bologna, and is a probable place of birth or employment. He is depicted in the Squarcialupi Codex as a Benedictine monk. Scholars have proposed that he was at a Benedictine monastery in Regola between 1362 and 1364, but this is not strongly substantiated. Allusions in the lyrics of his works suggest he worked under the Alberti or Malatesta families in Florence.

== Music ==
Six of Vincenzo's pieces survive to the present day: four of them are madrigals and two are cacce. Stylistic indications place Vincenzo as younger than Jacopo da Bologna and older than Lorenzo da Firenze and Donato da Cascia. Vincenzo makes more use of imitation in the madrigals than did Jacopo. Both of his cacce, which use the dialect of North Italy, depict marketplace scenes.

== Works ==
Madrigals

(all for two voices)

- Ay, sconsolato ed amoroso
- Già era ’l sol
- Gridavan li pastor
- Ita se n’era a star

Cacce

(all for three voices)

- In forma quasi tra ’l veghiar
- Nell’acqua chiara
