= Mazzuoli (surname) =

Mazzuoli is an Italian surname. Notable people with the surname include:

- Andrea Mazzuoli (born 1992), Italian football defender
- Giovanni Mazzuoli (also Giovanni degli Organi) (ca. 1360–1426), Italian composer and organist
- Giuseppe Mazzuoli (disambiguation), multiple people
