= Andreas de Florentia =

Italian composer (died 1415)

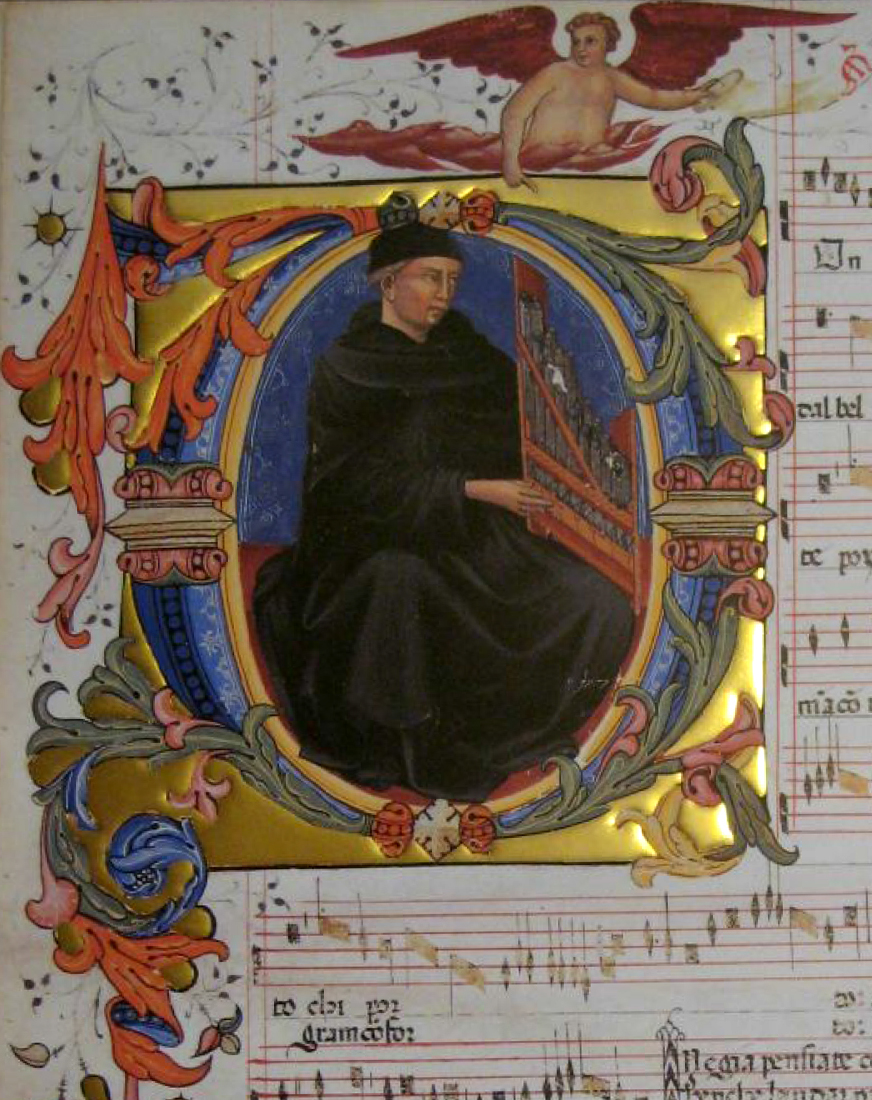
Historiated initial in the Squarcialupi Codex, believed to portray Andreas

Andreas de Florentia (also known as Andrea da Firenze, Andrea de' Servi, Andrea degli Organi and Andrea di Giovanni; died 1415) was a Florentine composer and organist of the late medieval era. Along with Francesco Landini and Paolo da Firenze, he was a leading representative of the Italian ars nova style of the Trecento, and was a prolific composer of secular songs, principally ballate.

== Life ==
Since Andreas was a member of the Servite religious order, whose records have largely survived intact, more is known about his life than is usually the case for fourteenth-century composers. He entered the order in 1375, though at what age is not known. One of his first activities within the order was to carry out a commission to build an organ for the Servite house in Florence, for which he hired Francesco Landini as a consultant. Among the surviving records are the receipts for the wine that the two consumed during the three days it took to tune the instrument.

Evidently he and Landini were successful, for in 1387 Andreas received a similar commission to build an organ for Florence Cathedral. A commission recorded in 1382 for a "Maestro Andrea" to build an organ in Rieti, between Florence and Rome, may have been his as well, but has not been conclusively identified. The two men were evidently close friends, from the evidence of their time together, as well as the references found in their music.

Andreas was also active within his order as an administrator. In 1380 he became prior of the Florentine Servite monastery, SS Annunziata; in 1393 he took on the additional role of prior of the monastery in Pistoia. From 1407 to 1410 he led the entire Servite order in Tuscany.

== Music ==
All of Andreas's surviving music with reliable attribution is in the genre of the ballata. Thirty are known, with eighteen being for two voices and twelve for three; in addition, one ballade in French may be his work, based on stylistic similarities and a contemporary attribution of it to a name similar to his. The main source for his work is the Squarcialupi Codex, which also includes, in the section containing Andreas's music, a colorful illustration of a man playing an organ, probably Andreas himself.

The two-voice ballate are usually for two singing voices; two of them include an instrumental tenor. Not all of the three-voice ballate have text in all three voices, and the third voice sometimes may have been played on an instrument.

Compared to Landini's music, in which refinement, elegance, and a memorable melodic line were the clear goals of the composer, Andreas's music is dramatic, restless, and sometimes disjunct, and includes sharp dissonances to highlight certain passages in the text. One of his ballate includes a melodic leap of an augmented octave, highlighting the word maledetto (accursed), causing it to leap out from the rest of the music.
