= Geisslerlieder =

Medieval music genre

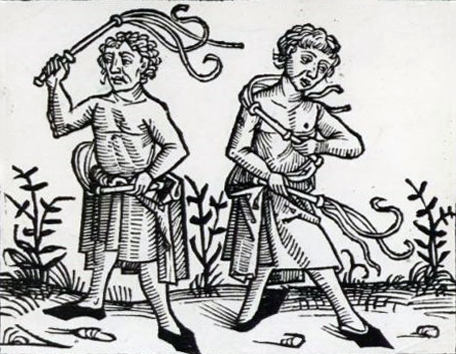
Flagellants, from a fifteenth-century woodcut

In medieval music, the Geisslerlieder, or Flagellant songs, were the songs of the wandering bands of flagellants, who overspread Europe during two periods of mass hysteria: the first during the middle of the 13th century, and the second during the Black Death in 1349. The music was simple, sung in the vernacular, often call-and-response, and closely related to folk song; indeed some of the flagellant songs survived into the 17th century as folk songs in Catholic parts of central Europe. Musically the Geisslerlied were related to the Laude spirituale: they were unaccompanied song, with instrumental accompaniment specifically forbidden.

== First outbreak, 13th century ==
The first period of Geisslerlied began in 1258 in response to the breakdown of civil order in northern Italy. Permanent warfare, famine, and an apparent demise of the moral order in contemporary life gave rise to a movement of public flagellation accompanied by singing; the penitents implored the help of God to ameliorate their sufferings, but never formed a specific sect, and neither did they attempt a social revolution. Initially, the flagellants were members of the mercantile and noble classes, but as the movement spread outside of Italy, lower social classes took part.

Of the first period of activity, only a single song has survived, although many of the words they sang have been recorded. Typically the texts were imploring, penitential, and apocalyptic.

== Second outbreak, 1349 ==
The Black Death was one of the most traumatic events in European history, and the renewed desperation of the people, hopeful for divine intervention to end their sufferings, brought about a return of the flagellants and the Geisslerlieder. Unlike the situation with the first outbreak, much of the music was preserved. A single priest, Hugo Spechtshart of Reutlingen, who happened to be a capable musician, was impressed by the activity he witnessed, and transcribed exactly what he heard of the singing of the flagellants; indeed his work was one of the earliest examples of folk-song collection. He produced a chronicle of what he heard in the Chronicon Hugonis sacerdotis de Rutelinga (1349), and the content corresponded closely to the description of the lost music from a hundred years before: simple monophonic songs of verse and refrain, with a leader singing the verse and the group of flagellants singing the refrain in unison. Particularly interesting about Hugo's transcriptions was his notation of variation between successive verses sung by the lead singer, a procedure common in folk song.

This second outbreak of flagellants, with their incessant and repetitive Geisslerlieder spread far wider than the first, reaching England, Poland, and Scandinavia, and probably attracted a greater number of participants, although it did not last as long: most of the records of the occurrence are from 1349.

The Geisslerlieder were suppressed, eventually, by the Church. Parodies of the movement quickly arose, as well: in Switzerland in 1350 a description survives of a group singing Geisslerlieder fitted with new words, as a bawdy drinking song; whether the drinkers flogged themselves is not known. A parody of a Geisslerlied is also found in the 1975 film Monty Python and the Holy Grail, where a group of monks chants the Pie Jesu while hitting themselves with boards.

== References and further reading ==
- Walter Salmen, "Geisslerlieder", in The New Grove Dictionary of Music and Musicians, ed. Stanley Sadie. 20 vol. London, Macmillan Publishers Ltd., 1980. ISBN 1-56159-174-2
- Richard H. Hoppin, Medieval Music. New York, W.W. Norton & Co., 1978. ISBN 0-393-09090-6
