= Bartolino da Padova =

Italian composer

Bartolino da Padova (also "Magister Frater Bartolinus de Padua") (fl. c. 1365 – c. 1405) was an Italian composer of the late 14th century. He is a representative of the stylistic period known as the Trecento, sometimes known as the "Italian ars nova", the transitional period between medieval and Renaissance music in Italy.

== Life ==
Next to nothing is known for certain about his life, but some information can be inferred from his music. He was probably from Padua, and he was a Carmelite, because a picture of him appears in the Squarcialupi Codex in which he is wearing the garb of that order. Most likely he was in the employ of the Carrara family, since references to them appear in his music. There is a possibility he spent some time in Florence around 1389–1390. References to the Visconti family in his music have been variously interpreted: some scholars have suggested that he was away from Padua, and may have been working in support of Gian Galeazzo Visconti during the period of his campaign of conquest in northern Italy, which included Padua, while more recent scholars have attempted to refute this view, suggesting instead that the references may be either satirical or in support of the Carrara family.

== Music ==
The Squarcialupi Codex, the largest source of Italian music of the 14th century, contains 37 pieces by Bartolino. A few other sources contain pieces by him, and his music was evidently widespread, indicating his reputation.

Bartolino's music, unlike that of his contemporary Francesco Landini, shows little influence from the French ars nova. His 27 ballate are almost all vocal duets, in the Italian fashion (the French at that time were mainly writing them as a single vocal line with one or two instrumental accompanying parts). Eleven of Bartolino's madrigals survive; like the ballate, they are mostly for two voices, however there are two pieces for three, and one of them (La Fiera Testa) has a macaronic text which is trilingual, one strophe in Italian, one in Latin and the final Ritornello section in French. This practice was common in the high Middle Ages but had become rare by the end of the 14th century.

== See also ==
- Music of the Trecento
