= Prepositus Brixiensis =

Italian composer and singer

Prepositus Brixiensis, i.e. the "Provost of Brescia", (fl. 1430) was a late medieval Italian composer and singer at Padua Cathedral.

== Works and recordings ==
Only four ballate and one rondeau survive:

- ballata - I ochi d'una ançolleta che m'alcide "the eyes of an angel have pierced me" - Ensemble Perlaro, PAN 2010
- O spirito gentil, tu m'ay percosso on "Sweet Love, Sweet Hope" Hilliard Ensemble, Isis; Also on "Voyage en Italie" La Reverdie Arcana reissue 2009.
