= Giovanni Mazzuoli =

Italian composer and organist

- Born: c. 1360; Florence, Italy
- Died: May 14, 1426; Florence, Italy
- Occupation(s): Composer, Organist
- Era: Late Medieval, Early Renaissance
- Works: Ballata (attributed), MS 2211 fragments
- Relatives: Piero Mazzuoli (son)

Giovanni Mazzuoli (also Giovanni degli Organi) (ca. 1360 – 14 May 1426) was an Italian composer and organist of the late medieval and early Renaissance eras.

== Life and career ==
Mazzuoli was born in Florence and probably trained on organ by his father Niccolò, who was organist at the church of Orsanmichele until 1376. Giovanni was given this position in 1379, which he held until 1412; he also held organist positions at S. Felicita (1385–1390) and Florence Cathedral (1390–1426). In his last years at Florence he was assisted at the organ by his son Piero.

== Music ==
Mazzuoli is best remembered for the absence, rather than the presence, of his musical compositions. There is a large section of the Squarcialupi Codex, an important source of early Italian music, which is marked out under his name. However, no music is written in these pages; they are decorated around the edges but left blank otherwise. There are at least ten of his works written on a palimpsest in an Italian manuscript, Florence, Archive of San Lorenzo, MS 2211, but the state of the parchment has until recently left them essentially unreadable. Nine of his son Piero's works are found in this manuscript as well. Nino Pirrotta attributed two works to Mazzuoli, one of which is a ballata ascribed in a manuscript to "Gian Toscan", and the other a piece in the Roquefort Codex ascribed to "Johannes Florentius". The latter has since been shown not to be a work of Giovanni Mazzuoli.

== Sources ==
- D'Accone, Frank (2001). "Mazzuoli, Giovanni [Giovanni degli Organi]". Grove Music Online. Oxford: Oxford University Press. doi:10.1093/gmo/9781561592630.article.40516. ISBN 978-1-56159-263-0. (subscription, Wikilibrary access, or UK public library membership required)
