= Leo Schrade =

German-American musicologist (1903–1964)

Leo Schrade (13 December 1903 – 21 September 1964) was a German-born American musicologist. Among his notable publications are critical editions of works by Guillaume de Machaut and Francesco Landini, the former for which he established the standard numbering scheme. He also wrote Monteverdi: Creator of Modern Music on Claudio Monteverdi; a controversial but influential work on Monteverdi's place in the history of Western classical music.

== Biography ==
He was born in Allenstein, East Prussia (today Olsztyn), then part of the German Empire on 13 December 1903. From 1923 he studied musicology in several universities—Heidelberg University, the Ludwig-Maximilians-Universität München, and Leipzig University—and also took courses at the Mannheim Conservatory. His teachers included Adolf Sandberger. He took the doctorate at Leipzig University in 1927, and then taught musicology first at the University of Königsberg, and then at the University of Bonn. Schrade's interests at the time lay mostly in early music: his Leipzig dissertation was on early organ music, and he completed the Habilitation in Königsberg in 1929 with a work on early instrumental music notation.

Schrade left Germany for the USA in late 1930s. In 1938, he was appointed assistant professor at Yale University, where he went on to become associate professor (1943), and finally professor of music history (1948); all the while, from 1939, also working as director of graduate studies in music (1939–1958). In 1958, he succeeded Jacques Handschin as professor and director of the musicology institute at the University of Basel. Schrade held these positions until his death in 1964; he died at Spéracèdes, France.

Schrade's critical editions of works by Guillaume de Machaut, Francesco Landini, and other medieval composers (in the Polyphonic Music of the Fourteenth Century series) are still of utmost importance for early music performers. He is also known today for his universal approach to the history of music: he worked not only on specialist topics such as medieval music, but also on works by Beethoven, Bach, Mozart, and many other composers. His large scale study of early opera composer Claudio Monteverdi, Monteverdi: Creator of Modern Music, still controversial among early music scholars, remains a key work in the evolution of critical attitudes towards the music of Monteverdi.

Schrade founded and edited the Yale University Collegium Musicum series of critical editions (which included, during his time, first publications of the Wickhambrook Lute Manuscript, works by Alessandro Scarlatti, Michael Haydn, and others) and the Yale Studies in the History of Music series of publications; he also worked as co-editor of several journals, such as Journal of Renaissance and Baroque Music and Annales musicologiques.

== Selected bibliography ==
=== Writings ===
- Die ältesten Denkmäler der Orgelmusik als Beitrag zu einer Geschichte der Toccata (The oldest memorials of organ music as a contribution to a history of the Toccata) (Dissertation, University of Leipzig, 1927)
- Die handschriftliche Überlieferung der ältesten Instrumentalmusik (The handwritten deliverances of the oldest instrumental music) (Habilitationsschrift, University of Königsberg, 1929)
- Beethoven in France: The Growth of an Idea (New Haven, CT, 1942)
- Bach: the Conflict between the Sacred and the Secular (Journal of the History of Ideas, vii (1946), 151–194. Published separately: New York, 1954)
- Monteverdi, Creator of Modern Music (New York, 1950)
- Renaissance: The Historical Conception of an Epoch (IMSCR V: Utrecht 1952, 19–32)
- Political Compositions in French Music of the 12th and 13th Centuries (AnnM, i (1953), 9–63. Reprinted in: De scientia musicae studia atque orationes, ed. E. Lichtenhahn (Berne, 1967), 152–211)
- La représentation d'Edipo tiranno au Teatro Olimpico (Vicence 1585) (Paris, 1960)
- Tragedy in the Art of Music (Cambridge, MA, 1964)

=== Editions ===
- Luys Milan: Libro de musica de vihuela de mano intitulado El maestro. Publikationen älterer Musik, ii (Leipzig, 1927)
- Polyphonic Music of the Fourteenth Century, 8 volumes, edited the first four (1956–58)
  - Vol. 1: The Roman de Fauvel; The Works of Philippe de Vitry; French Cycles of the ordinarium missae
  - Vols. 2–3: Guillaume de Machaut: Works
  - Vol. 4: Francesco Landini: Works
