= Rossi Codex =

Italian manuscript of fourteenth-century music

The Rossi Codex is a music manuscript collection of the 14th century. The manuscript is presently divided into two sections, one in the Vatican Library and another, smaller section in the Northern Italian town of Ostiglia. The codex contains 37 secular works including madrigals, cacce and, uniquely among trecento sources, monophonic ballatas. The codex is of great interest for trecento musicologists because for many years it was considered the earliest source of fourteenth-century Italian music. Although other pre-1380 sources of secular, polyphonic, Italian music have now been identified, none are nearly so extensive as the Rossi Codex.

== Structure and history ==
Although the manuscript originally had at least 32 folios, only 18 survive today.

The largest part of the Rossi Codex is currently in the Vatican Library (Biblioteca Apostolica Vaticana, Rossi 215). This section comprises seven bifolios, ff. 1–8 and ff. 18–21. In the early nineteenth century, it was in the possession of Italian collector Giovan Francesco de Rossi, for whom this manuscript and the collection in the Vatican is named. In 1857 his widow gave the manuscripts to the Jesuit library in Linz, later transferred to Vienna. In that collection, the manuscript had the shelfmark VIII.154. In 1922, the Jesuits gave the collection to the Vatican. The manuscript was first brought to the attention of the musical community by Monsignor Gino Borghezio in 1925 and then described in more depth by the musicologists Heinrich Besseler (1927), Friedrich Ludwig (1928), and Johannes Wolf (1939). Although all three of these scholars contended that the manuscript, like most of the surviving trecento sources, was Florentine, the Italian scholars Ferdinando Liuzzi, Ugo Sesini, and Ettore Li Gotti noted that linguistic evidence in the texts pointed to northern Italy, and the Veneto in particular as more likely point of origin. Most recently, Pirrotta has asserted a specific origin in Verona on the basis of symbols in the codex's works.

The source's whereabouts prior to Rossi's possession are unclear. Kurt von Fischer claimed that it was owned by Cardinal Domenico Capranica (1400–1458) who gave the manuscript to the college he founded (Collegio Capranica). However, as Pirrotta notes, other sources which De Rossi purchased from the Collegio in 1842 have a note acknowledging the Collegio as their origin. This codex has none. Pirrotta has further noted that De Rossi purchased books in Venice and Verona and speculates that the codex could have been acquired during one of these trips.

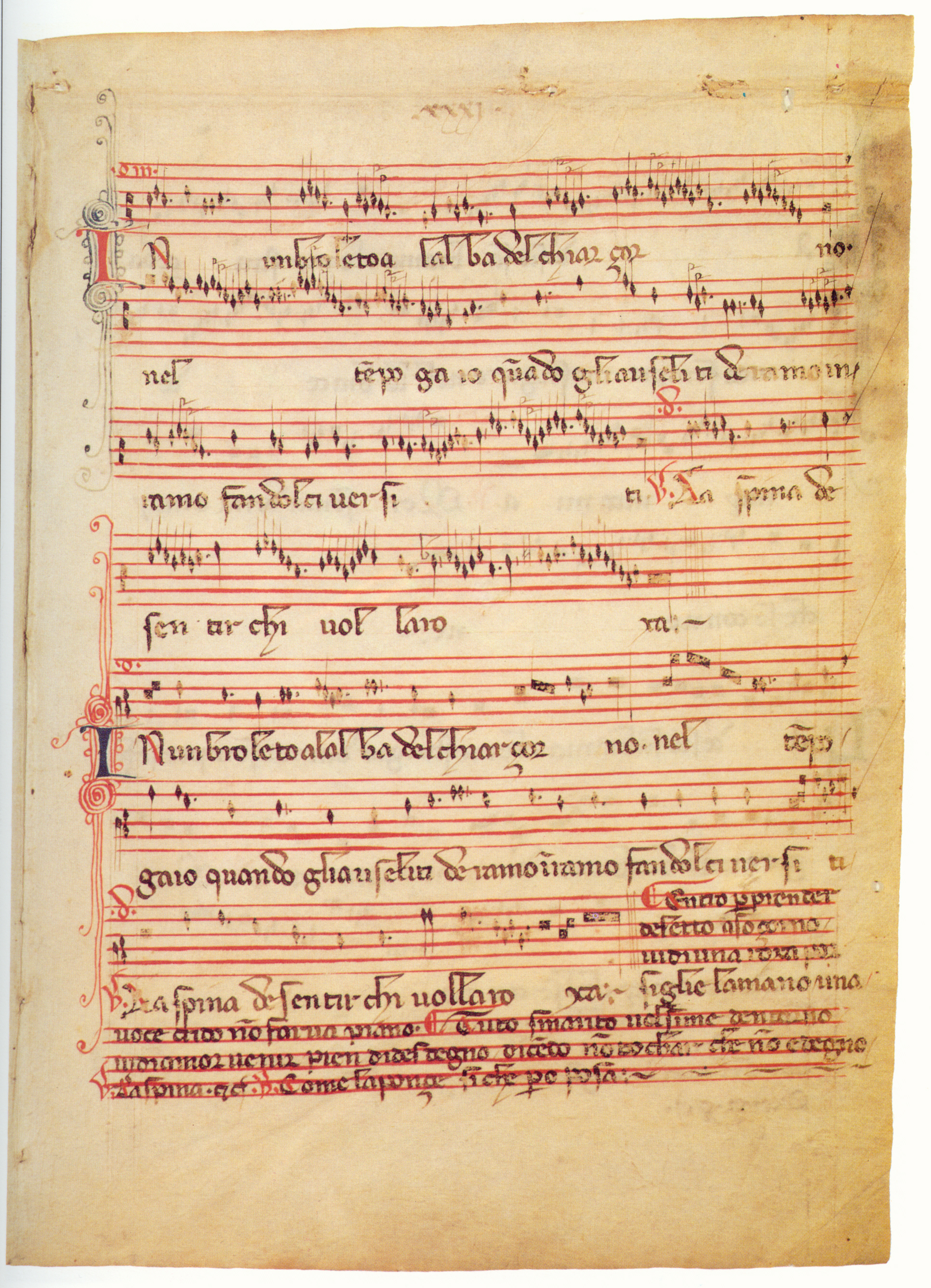
Folio 31r of the Rossi codex, from the Ostiglia fragment showing "In un broleto, al'alba," an anonymous madrigal

A smaller section of the manuscript is in the library of the Fondazione Greggiati in Ostiglia (Biblioteca musicale Opera Pia "G. Greggiati"). Though the source is nearly always listed as "MS without shelfmark," it has recently been given the catalog number "Mus. rari B 35." These two bifolios were discovered by Oscar Mischiati in 1963. Since the folios did not appear in any library catalogs prior to 1963, and since the folios show evidence of having been folded, they were likely used as covers or cover reinforcements for other volumes.

== Creation and contents ==
While the precise history of the Codex is obscure, some details about its creation have been established. Most likely it preserves the repertory of the group of singers and composers who were gathered by Alberto della Scala in Padua and Verona between around 1330 and 1345. Alberto was the son of Can Grande della Scala, Prince of Verona, the famous patron of Dante. Alberto was an even greater patron of the arts than his father, according to an 18th-century history. He lived in Padua, which was controlled by the Scaglia family until 1337; the presence of the local Paduan dialect in much of the music reinforces a Paduan origin for much of the music. Most significant of all, notational peculiarities in the manuscript are close to those described by Marchetto da Padova in his Pomerium in arte musice mensurate of the second decade of the century, which was from the same region.

Though the music was probably composed between 1325 and 1355, recent evidence suggests that the codex, like most trecento sources, is retrospective. The manuscript was almost certainly copied after 1350 with the most accepted current date being Pirrotta's of c. 1370.

Overall, there are 29 pieces, some of which are incomplete, in the Vatican fragment. The Ostiglia leaves add another eight compositions to the total. Thirty of the pieces are madrigals, including one extremely unusual canonic madrigal, and there is one caccia, one rondello, and five ballatas. All of the ballatas are monophonic. While the music is anonymous, two composers have been identified from the appearance of the same pieces with attributions in other, later sources: Maestro Piero and Giovanni da Cascia.

=== Media ===
Madrigal Cum altre ucele
Unknown composer

== See also ==
- Music of the Trecento

== References and further reading ==
- Nino Pirrotta, ed. Il Codice Rossi 215: Studio introduttivo ed edizione in facsimile (The Rossi Codex 215: Introductory Study and Facsimile Edition). Ars Nova 2. Lucca: LIM (Libreria Musicale Italiana), 1992. ISBN 88-7096-033-1
- Tiziana Sucato, Il Codice Rossiano 215: Madrigali ballate, una caccia, un rotondello. Diverse voci 1. Pisa: Edizione ETS, 2003. ISBN 88-467-0600-5
- "Sources, Italian Polyphony 1325-1400", in Grove Music Online, ed. L. Macy (Accessed December 8, 2005), (subscription access)
