= Jacopo da Bologna =

Italian composer (fl. 1340–1386)

Jacopo da Bologna (fl. 1340–1386) was an Italian composer of the Trecento, the period sometimes known as the Italian ars nova. He was one of the first composers of this group, making him a contemporary of Gherardello da Firenze and Giovanni da Firenze. He concentrated mainly on madrigals, including both canonic (caccia-madrigal) and non-canonic types, but also composed a single example each of a caccia, lauda-ballata, and motet.

== Life and career ==
His setting of Non al suo amante, written about 1350, is the only known contemporaneous setting of Petrarch's poetry.

Jacopo's ideal was "suave dolce melodia" (sweet, gentle melody). His style is marked by fully texted voice parts that never cross. The untexted passages which connect the textual lines in many of his madrigals are also noteworthy.

He is well represented in the Squarcialupi Codex, the large collection of 14th-century music long owned by the Medici family; twenty-nine compositions of his are found in that source, the principal source for music of the Italian ars nova, alongside music by Francesco Landini and others. A portrait of Jacopo is found in this manuscript, and another possible portrait is found in a north-Italian manuscript, Fulda, Landesbibliothek, Hs. D23, fol. 302. However, the identification of Jacopo as the subject of the painting in the latter source was made by a hand later than the manuscript copyist's, throwing some doubt on its reliability.

In addition to his compositions, Jacopo also wrote a short theoretical treatise, L'arte del biscanto misurato, which is influenced by French notational theory. He may also have been active as a poet, to judge from the autobiographical texts of the madrigals Io me sun un che, Oselleto salvazo, and Vestìse la cornachia.
