= Marchetto da Padova =

Italian music theorist and composer

- Born: Marchettus of Padua; Padua
- Occupations: music theorist, composer and writer

Marchetto da Padova (Marchettus of Padua; fl. 1305 – 1319) was an Italian music theorist and composer of the late medieval era. His innovations in notation of time-values were fundamental to the music of the Italian ars nova, as was his work on defining the modes and refining tuning. In addition, he was the first music theorist to discuss chromaticism.

== Life ==
Most likely he was born in Padua. Little is known about his life, but he is recorded as being music teacher for the choirboys at the cathedral in Padua in 1305 and 1306, and he left Padua in 1308 to work in other cities in the Veneto and the Romagna. His two major treatises seem to have been written between 1317 and 1319, shortly before Philippe de Vitry produced his Ars nova (c. 1322), which gave its name to the music of the age. Marchetto indicated in the treatises themselves that he wrote them at Cesena and Verona. There are no other reliable records of his life, although his fame was evidently widespread, and his work became hugely influential later in the 14th century.

== Music ==
Only three motets have been reliably attributed to Marchetto, one of them due to his name appearing as an acrostic in the text for one of the parts (Ave regina celorum/Mater innocencie). Based on another acrostic in the same motet, it seems it was composed for the dedication of the Scrovegni Chapel (also known as the Arena Chapel) in Padua on March 25, 1305.

== Writings and influence ==
Marchetto published two major treatises, the Lucidarium in arte musice plane (probably in 1317–1318), and the Pomerium in arte musice mensurate (probably 1318). He also published an abridged version of the Pomerium as the Brevis compilatio, though the date of this is not known. He stated in the Pomerium that he wrote it while staying at the house of Raynaldus de Cintis in Cesena, who was lord of the city from 1321 to 1326, however most scholars believe that the Pomerium was written in 1318.

The meanings of the two titles are: lucidarium, an encyclopaedic clarification and pomerium, which originally meant the boundaries of the city of Rome but by Marchetto's time had taken on the meaning of an enclosed orchard or green space.

Precise dating of his work has been important to musicology because of the controversy over whether he was influenced by the innovations of the French ars nova, as written by Philippe de Vitry and Jean de Muris in the 1320s, or whether the influence went the other way. Most likely Marchetto's work was first, although he was well aware of the French practice – which, like most innovations in music before the 20th century, was only discussed in writing years after the actual musical innovation took place. All of the treatises except for the abridged version are in a heavily scholastic framework, and were almost certainly collections of oral teachings.

Marchetto's innovations are in three areas: tuning, chromaticism, and notation of time-values. He was the first medieval writer to propose dividing the whole tone into more than two parts. A semitone could consist of one, two, three, or four of these parts, depending on whether it was, respectively, a diesis, an enharmonic semitone, a diatonic semitone, or a chromatic semitone. Marchetto preferred to widen major intervals and narrow minor ones for melodic effect, the opposite of what the later meantone temperament does. The exact size of the major sixth he described is the subject of some disagreement, but was considered by George Secor to be 12:7 (933 cents).

In the area of time values, Marchetto improved on the old Franconian system of notation; music notation was by this time evolving into the method known today where an individual symbol represented a specific time-value, and Marchetto contributed to this trend by developing a method of compound time division, and by assigning specific note shapes to specific time values.

Additionally, Marchetto discussed the rhythmic modes, an old rhythmic notation method from the 13th-century ars antiqua, and added four "imperfect" modes to the existing five "perfect" modes, thus allowing for the contemporary Italian practice of mixed, flexible and expressive rhythmic performance.

The Lucidarium also included one of the earliest texts addressing the relationship between composer – Marchetto used the word musician, borrowing from Boethius's definition in De institutione musica libri quinque – and performer. He set a distinct hierarchy, defining the "musician" or composer as the artist making judgements in accordance with his learned knowledge, while describing the singer as the instrument on which the musician performs, and likening their relationship to that of the judge and the crier.

Marchetto's treatises were hugely influential in the 14th and early 15th centuries, and were widely copied and disseminated. The Rossi Codex, which is the earliest surviving source of secular Italian polyphony and which contains music written between 1325 and 1355, shows obvious influence of Marchetto, especially in its use of his notational improvements.

Without the innovations of Marchetto, the music of the Italian Trecento – for example the secular music of Landini – would not have been possible.

== See also ==
- Music of the Trecento
- 58 equal temperament

== References and further reading ==
- The New Grove Dictionary of Music and Musicians, ed. Stanley Sadie. 20 vol. London, Macmillan Publishers Ltd., 1980. ISBN 1-56159-174-2
- Richard H. Hoppin, Medieval Music. New York, W.W. Norton & Co., 1978. ISBN 0-393-09090-6
- Jan Herlinger: "Marchetto da Padova", Grove Music Online ed. L. Macy (Accessed February 28, 2005), (subscription access)
- Jay Rahn: Practical Aspects of Marchetto's Tuning. Music Theory Online: The Online Journal of the Society for Music Theory. vol. 4, no. 6, 1998. ISSN 1067-3040 (Accessed January 3, 2006)
- Margo Schulter: "Xenharmonic Excursion to Padua, 1318:Marchettus, the cadential diesis, and neo-Gothic tunings"
- Joseph L.monzo: "Speculations on Marchetto of Padua's fifth-Tones"
- Karol Berger: "Musica Ficta. Theories of accidental inflexions in vocal polyphony from Marchetto da Padova to Gioseffo Zarlino", Cambridge University Press, 1987, especially pp. 22–9, 86-87, 141-3.
