= Mazzoli =

Mazzoli is an Italian surname. Notable people with the surname include:

- Athirson Mazolli e Oliveira (born 1977), Brazilian footballer
- Estrella Mazzoli de Mathov, Argentine physicist
- Missy Mazzoli (born 1980), American opera composer
- Romano L. Mazzoli (1932–2022), American politician and lawyer
- Stefano Mazzoli (born 1996), Italian golfer

== See also ==
- Immigration Reform and Control Act of 1986 aka Simpson-Mazzoli Act
- Mazzuoli (disambiguation)
