= Lorenzo da Firenze =

Italian composer

Lorenzo Masi, known as Lorenzo da Firenze (Magister Laurentius de Florentia; died December 1372 or January 1373), was an Italian composer and music teacher of the Trecento. He was closely associated with Francesco Landini in Florence, and was one of the composers of the period known as the Italian ars nova.

== Life and career ==
Little is known about his life, but some details can be inferred from the music. He was active as a teacher in Florence, probably as a teacher of Landini himself. He became a canon at the church of San Lorenzo in 1348, a post which he retained for the rest of his life.

Lorenzo is represented in the Squarcialupi Codex, the illuminated manuscript which is the most comprehensive source of Italian music of the 14th century, with 16 pieces of music, 10 madrigals, 6 ballate and one caccia. In addition to his contribution to that collection, he wrote two mass movements which have survived (one of which is of doubtful attribution) and a pedagogical piece (the Antefana), the text of which shows that he was a teacher.

== Music ==
His style is progressive, sometimes experimental, but conservative in other ways. While he used imitation, a relatively new musical technique, and heterophonic texture, one of the rarest textures in European music, he also still used parallel perfect intervals. Voice crossings are common, when he wrote for more than one voice (most of his music is monophonic). In addition he used chromaticism to a degree rare in the 14th century, at least prior to the activity of the composers of the ars subtilior.

French classical music influence is evident in some of his music, for example isorhythmic passages (characteristic of Machaut, but rare in Italian music). Some of the notational quirks in his work also suggest a connection with France.

External audio
- A poste messe performed by Alkemie
- A poste messe

== See also ==
- Music of the Trecento
- Ars nova
- Francesco Landini
