= Giuseppe Mazzuoli =

Giuseppe Mazzuoli may refer to:

- Giuseppe Mazzuoli (c. 1536 – 1589), Renaissance painter known as il Bastaruolo
- Giuseppe Mazzuoli (1644–1725), sculptor of Rome
- Giuseppe Maria Mazzuoli, an Italian sculptor and stucco artist
