= Lauda (song) =

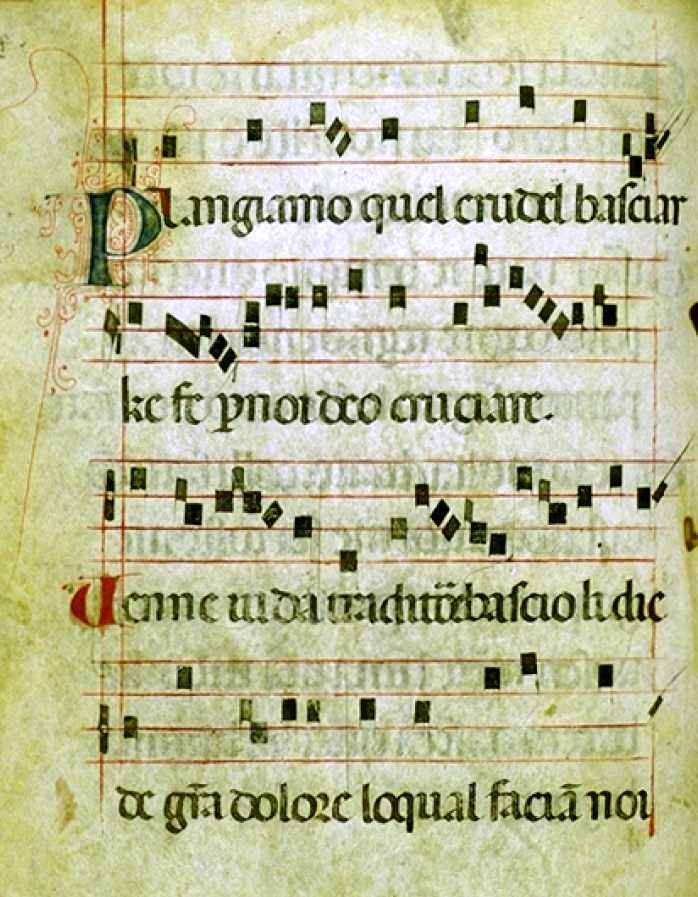
13th-century laudario manuscript showing the notation and text of an actual lauda ("Plangiamo quel crudel basciare")

The lauda (Italian pl. laude) or lauda spirituale was the most important form of vernacular sacred song in Italy in the late medieval era and the Renaissance. Laude remained popular into the nineteenth century. The lauda was often associated with Christmas, and so is in part equivalent to the English carol, French noel, Spanish villancico, and like these genres occupies a middle ground between folk and learned lyrics.

== Origin and spread of the lauda ==
Originally, the lauda was a monophonic (single-voice) form, but a polyphonic type developed in the early fifteenth century. The early lauda was probably influenced by the music of the troubadours, since it shows similarities in rhythm, melodic style, and especially notation. Many troubadours had fled their original homelands, such as Provence, during the Albigensian Crusade in the early 13th century, and settled in northern Italy, where their music was influential in the development of the Italian secular style.

A monophonic form of the lauda spread widely throughout Europe during the 13th and 14th centuries as the music of the flagellants; this form was known as the Geisslerlied, and picked up the vernacular language in each country it affected, including Germany, Poland, England and Scandinavia.

After 1480, the singing of laude was extremely popular in Florence, since the monk Savonarola (and others) had prohibited the dissemination of any other style of sacred vernacular music. Many of Josquin's motets and masses are based on melodies he heard in laude during his sojourns in Italy around this time.

Laude had a resurgence of popularity again at the time of the Counter-Reformation, since one of the musical goals of the Council of Trent was to increase the intelligibility of text, and the simple, easily understood laude provided an ideal example.

The significance of the lauda diminished as the oratorio evolved. However, tunes and lyrics continued to influence later music.

== Latin songs with some characteristics of the lauda ==
Song Latin songs, notably 13 Latin antiphons preserved in the Bobbio Abbey, have sometimes been called "Latin laude," however, which more closely resemble the Latin language version of the Italian ballata.

== Selected recordings ==
- O cieco mondo - composers Jacopo da Bologna, Alexander Demophon, Francesco Landini, Vincenzo Ruffo, and Anonymous. Paul Van Nevel Huelgas Ensemble, Deutsche Harmonia Mundi
