= Madrigal (Trecento) =

Italian musical form of the 14th century

The Trecento Madrigal is an Italian musical form of the 14th century. It is quite distinct from the madrigal of the Renaissance and early Baroque, with which it shares only the name and Italian origin. The madrigal of the Trecento flourished ca. 1340–1370 with a short revival near 1400. It was a composition for two (or, rarely, three) voices, sometimes on a pastoral subject. In its earliest development it was simple construction: Francesco da Barberino in 1300 called it a "raw and chaotic singalong".

The text of the madrigal is divided into three sections: two strophes called terzetti set to the same music and a concluding section called the ritornello usually in a different meter, creating an aaB form.

== History ==
The origins of the madrigal are obscure, and debated, with one school of thought seeing it as a secular mutation of the conductus of the ars antiqua, and another seeing it as deriving from 13th-century secular monophonic song with an improvised accompaniment. Little Italian music from the 13th century has survived, so links between medieval forms such as the conductus and troubadour song and the music of the trecento are largely inferential. The origin of the name (which appears in early sources as madriale, matricale, madregal, and marigalis) is also unclear; two possibilities are derivation from materialis (in contrast to formalis), designating a poem without a definite form, or from matrix, meaning mother, either as in a song in the mother tongue or music used for Mother Church.

The earliest stage in the development of the madrigal is seen in the Rossi Codex, a collection of music from ca. 1350 or earlier, compiled around 1370. It has been suggested that the ornamentation of the upper voices may be improvised above a skeletal structure. Each line of a madrigal often has a long melisma on each of the first and penultimate syllables.

In the madrigal's later stages of development its uppermost voice was often highly elaborate, with the lower voice, the tenor, much less so. The form at this time was probably a development of connoisseurs, and sung by small groups of cognoscenti; there is no evidence of its widespread popularity, unlike the madrigal of the 16th century. By the end of the 14th century it had fallen out of favor, with other forms (in particular, the ballata and imported French music) taking precedence, some of which were even more highly refined and ornamented.

By the beginning of 15th century the term was no longer used musically. The later, 16th-century madrigal is unrelated, although it often used texts written in the 14th century (for instance by Petrarch).

== Notable composers ==
Important composers of the madrigal in the Trecento include:

- Jacopo da Bologna
- Giovanni da Cascia
- Vincenzo da Rimini
- Maestro Piero
- Lorenzo da Firenze
- Niccolò da Perugia
- Francesco Landini
- Donato da Cascia
- Johannes Ciconia (later revivalist)

== See also ==
- Music of the Trecento
