= Giovanni da Cascia =

Italian composer

Giovanni da Cascia, also Jovannes de Cascia, Johannes de Florentia, Maestro Giovanni da Firenze, was an Italian composer of the medieval era, active in the middle of the fourteenth century.

== Life and career ==
Virtually nothing is known about Giovanni's life. From his surname it is presumed that he was born in the village of Cascia, near Florence. It was once thought that he held a post at Florence Cathedral, but this is no longer accepted. A Florentine chronicle states that Giovanni and Jacopo da Bologna competed at Mastino II of Scala's court; Mastino died in 1351. The metaphors used in his works are consistent with prevailing idioms of the mid-14th century. His portrait in the Squarcialupi Codex shows him without priestly garments.

== Music ==
Nineteen of Giovanni's compositions survive, scattered in nine manuscripts. Sixteen of these are madrigals, and three of them are cacce. He is thought to have written some of his own texts. Musically, Giovanni's madrigals are of importance in the development of the style of the 14th-century madrigal. He tends to use extended melismas on the first and penultimate syllables of a poetic line, and sometimes introduces hockets at these points. The middles of the lines are generally syllabic. Many of his works are very similar in style to the anonymous works preserved in the Rossi Codex.

Several of his works survive in quite different versions; this is evidence that improvisation was still an important aspect of musical performance up to this time. Giovanni's works tend not to be tonally unified; they begin and end on different notes, and in some cases, such as Nascoso el viso, each poetic line begins and ends on different notes. Occasional imitation is found in his work.

== Works ==
Madrigals

(all for two voices)

- Agnel son bianco
- Appress’un fiume chiaro
- Deh, come dolcemente
- Donna già fu’
- Fra mille corvi
- In su la ripa
- La bella stella
- Nascoso el viso
- Nel meço a sei paon
- O perlaro gentil
- O tu, cara sciença
- Per ridda andando ratto
- Più non mi curo
- Quando la stella
- Sedendo all’ombra
- Togliendo l’una a l’altra

Cacce

(all for three voices)

- Con brachi assai
- Nel bosco sença foglie
- Per larghi prati

Doubtful

- De soto ’l verde (2 voices)

Lost

- Soni multi et ballate (1 voice)

== Editions ==
Editions of all of Giovanni's works have been completed by W. Thomas Marrocco and Nino Pirrotta in the twentieth century.
