= Gherardello da Firenze =

Italian composer

Gherardello da Firenze (also Niccolò di Francesco or Ghirardellus de Florentia) (c. 1320–1325 – 1362 or 1363) was an Italian composer of the Trecento. He was one of the first composers of the period sometimes known as the Italian ars nova.

== Life ==
Gherardello was a member of a musical family, and both his brother Jacopo and his son Giovanni were also composers; however, none of their music survives. He was probably born in or near Florence, and spent most of his life there.

In 1343 he appears in the records of the cathedral of Florence, Santa Reparata (this was before the building of the main cathedral, Santa Maria del Fiore) as a clerk. Later he became a priest, and then served as chaplain of Santa Reparata from 1345 until 1351—during the years that the Black Death ravaged the city.

Probably around 1351 he joined the order of the Vallombrosa, a Benedictine order with an abbey about 30 km from Florence. Details of the last years of his life are lacking, and his death date is inferred from a sonnet written in 1362 or 1363, probably by Simone Peruzzi, mourning his death, which occurred at Florence.

== Music ==
Although Gherardello was renowned during his time for his sacred music, little of it has survived. A Gloria and an Agnus Dei, both by Gherardello, are among just a handful of mass movements by Italian composers from before 1400. The style of Gherardello's mass movements is similar to that of the madrigal, although more restrained emotionally: they are for two voices, which sing together most of the time, with occasional passages where they sing in alternation.

Gherardello's secular music has survived in greater abundance. Ten madrigals, all for two voices; five ballatas, all for a single voice; and a very famous caccia, Tosto che l'alba, which is for three voices, survive. Stylistically his music is typical of the early Trecento, with the voices usually singing the same words at the same time, except for the caccia, in which the upper two voices sing a quickly moving canon, and the lowest voice sings a freely composed part in longer notes.

Most of Gherardello's music has been preserved in the 15th century Squarcialupi Codex, although several other manuscripts, all from Tuscany, contain works of his. A portrait on the pages of the Codex devoted to his music is most likely him (each composer in that illuminated manuscript is pictured).

== See also ==
- Music of the Trecento

== References and further reading ==
- The New Grove Dictionary of Music and Musicians, ed. Stanley Sadie. 20 vol. London, Macmillan Publishers Ltd., 1980. ISBN 1-56159-174-2
- Gustave Reese, Music in the Renaissance. New York, W.W. Norton & Co., 1954. ISBN 0-393-09530-4
- Richard H. Hoppin, Medieval Music. New York, W.W. Norton & Co., 1978. ISBN 0-393-09090-6
- Fischer, Kurt von; D'Agostino, Gianluca (2001). "Gherardello da Firenze". Grove Music Online (8th ed.). Oxford University Press. ISBN 978-1-56159-263-0.
