= Nino Pirrotta =

Italian musicologist (1908–1998)

Nino Pirrotta (13 June 1908 in Palermo – 22 January 1998 in Palermo) was an Italian musicologist, pianist, music critic, and academic. As a musicologist, he achieved international renown for his scholarship of Italian music from the late medieval, Renaissance and early Baroque eras.

== Early life and education ==
Born Antonino Pirrotta in Palermo, Pirotta was the son of Vincenzo Pirotta and Adele Pirrotta (née Restivo). His father owned a tinplate lithography factory. The family moved in intellectual circles in Palermo, and his father's cousin was the dramatist and novelist Luigi Pirandello. His sister Giulia married the composer Ottavio Ziino.

In his youth, Pirrotta studied the piano privately with Luigi Amadio who was a professor of the organ at the Palermo Conservatory. He enrolled at the conservatory as a teenager while attending high school, but never graduated from that institution. He obtained his high school diploma in 1925 and later that year became a student of literature at the University of Palermo while continuing to train at the conservatory. He dropped out of both the university and the conservatory in 1927 to follow his teacher Amadio to Florence Conservatory.

Pirotta was concurrently a student at both the Florence Conservatory and the University of Florence. He graduated from the Florence Conservatory in 1929 with degrees in organ performance and organ composition. In 1930 he earned a degree in literature from the University of Florence with an emphasis in art history; writing a thesis on majolica painting of the Renaissance.

== Career ==
After graduating in 1930, Pirrotta served a year in obligatory military service. Upon completing this obligation, he returned to Palermo in 1931 where he simultaneously took a position as music critic at the newspaper L'Ora and began a career as a concert pianist. He also worked as an assistant in the library of the Palermo Conservatory until 1938 when he was appointed professor of music history and librarian at that institution. In 1939 he married Lea Paternostro (1911-1996) with whom he had four children. He achieved prestige for his work restoring the Palermo Conservatory's library after it was destroyed by bombing during World War II.

Pirotta established himself as an important academic with his first book, Il Sacchetti e la Tecnica Musicale (1935, with Ettore Li Gotti) which focused on the music and poetry of the Trecento. He went on to publish several more works on that topic and became one of the most important scholars on the Italian Ars Nova, Florentine Camerata, and early opera. In 1970 his book Li Dui Orfei (later published in English in 1982 as Music and Theater from Poliziano to Monteverdi), which traced the pre-history of opera, was awarded the Kinkeldey Award by the American Musicological Society.

In 1948 Pirrotta left his position as librarian and professor at the Palermo Conservatory to become the music librarian of both the Rome Conservatory and the Accademia Nazionale di Santa Cecilia; a position he maintained until 1956. His post at these institutions allowed him access to original documents that furthered his work publishing as a musicologist. In 1954 he became a visiting professor at Princeton University. He joined the faculty of Harvard University in 1956 where he held the posts of both the Naumburg Professor of Music and Chief Music Librarian. He served as head of the music department from 1965 to 1968, after which he continued to teach at Harvard through 1972. From 1972 until his retirement in 1983 (with the exception of 1979 when he was once again at Harvard), he taught at the University of Rome as the chair of musicology. He died in 1998 at the age of 89.

== Selected bibliography ==
- Pirrotta, Nino (1955). "Marchettus de Padua and the Italian Ars Nova". Musica Disciplina. 9: 57–71. JSTOR 20531887.
- Pirrotta, Nino (1994). "On Landini and San Lorenzo". Musica Disciplina. 48: 5–13. JSTOR 20532378.
