= Trecento =

Italian culture and art of 1300–1399

The Trecento (/treɪˈtʃɛntoʊ/ tray-CHEN-toh, US also /trɛ-/ treh-; Italian: [treˈtʃɛnto]; short for milletrecento, "1300") refers to the 14th century in Italian cultural history. The Trecento is considered to be the beginning of the Italian Renaissance or at least the Proto-Renaissance in art history. The Trecento was also famous as a time of heightened literary activity, with writers working in the vernacular instead of Latin. In music, the Trecento was a time of vigorous activity in Italy, as it was in France, with which there was a frequent interchange of musicians and influences.

== Period ==
=== Art ===
The Trecento is considered to be the beginning of the Italian Renaissance or at least the Proto-Renaissance in art history. Painters of the Trecento included Giotto di Bondone, as well as painters of the Sienese School, which became the most important in Italy during the century, including Duccio di Buoninsegna, Simone Martini, Lippo Memmi, Ambrogio Lorenzetti and his brother Pietro. Important sculptors included two pupils of Giovanni Pisano: Arnolfo di Cambio and Tino di Camaino, and Bonino da Campione.

=== Vernacular writing ===
The Trecento was also famous as a time of heightened literary activity, with writers working in the vernacular instead of Latin. Dante, Petrarch and Boccaccio were the leading writers of the age. Dante produced his famous La divina commedia (The Divine Comedy), now seen as a summation of the medieval worldview, and Petrarch wrote verse in a lyrical style influenced by the Provençal poetry of the troubadours.

=== Secular music ===
In music, the Trecento was a time of vigorous activity in Italy, as it was in France, with which there was a frequent interchange of musicians and influences. Distinguishing the period from the preceding century was an emphasis on secular song, especially love lyrics; much of the surviving music is polyphonic, but the influence of the troubadours who came to Italy, fleeing the Albigensian Crusade in the early 13th century, is evident. In contrast to the artistic and literary achievements of the century, Trecento music (at least in written form) flourished in the second half of the century, and the period is often extended (especially in English-language scholarship) into the first decades of the 15th century, as a so-called "Long Trecento". Musicians and composers of the Trecento included the renowned Francesco Landini, as well as Maestro Piero, Gherardello da Firenze, Jacopo da Bologna, Giovanni da Cascia, Paolo "Tenorista" da Firenze, Niccolò da Perugia, Bartolino da Padova, Antonio Zachara da Teramo, Matteo da Perugia, and Johannes Ciconia.

== See also ==
- Duecento – the 13th century in Italian culture
- Quattrocento – the 15th century in Italian culture
- Cinquecento – the 16th century in Italian culture
- Seicento – the 17th century in Italian culture
- Settecento – the 18th century in Italian culture
- Ottocento – the 19th century in Italian culture
- Novecento – the 20th century in Italian culture
- Italian Renaissance – started at end of 14th century
