= Ballata =

Music genre

The ballata (plural: ballate) is an Italian poetic and musical form in use from the late 13th to the 15th century. The term comes from the verb ballare, to dance, and the form certainly began as dance music. It has the musical form AbbaA, with the first and last stanzas having the same texts. It is thus most similar to the French musical 'forme fixe' virelai (and not the ballade as the name might otherwise suggest). The repeated "A" is called the ripresa, the "b" lines are piedi (feet) or mutazione, while the fourth line is called a "volta". Additional piedi and volte can be added to create longer ballate in the forms such as AbbaAbbaA, etc. Unlike the virelai, the two "b" lines usually have exactly the same music and only in later ballate pick up the (formerly distinctly French) first and second (open and close) endings.

Ballate are classified according to the length of the ripresa. The most common form is the ballata piccola (one 11-syllable line). Longer 11-syllable forms include the ballata minore (two-line ripresa), ballata mezzana (three-line), and ballata grande (four-line). The shortest form, the ballata minima, has a single 7-syllable ripresa.

The ballata was one of the most prominent secular musical forms during the trecento, the period often known as the Italian ars nova. Ballate are sung at the end of each day of Boccaccio's Decameron (only one musical setting of these poems, by Lorenzo da Firenze, survives). Early ballate, such as those found in the Rossi Codex are monophonic. Later, ballate are found for two or three voices. The most notable composer of ballate is Francesco Landini, who composed in the second half of the 14th century. Other composers of ballata include Andrea da Firenze, a contemporary of Francesco's, as well as Bartolino da Padova, Johannes Ciconia, Prepositus Brixiensis and Zacara da Teramo. In the 15th century both Arnold de Lantins and Guillaume Dufay wrote ballate; they were among the last to do so.

== Lauda and Ballata ==
The vernacular sacred genre called lauda were often written in ballata form both before and after the height of the Trecento polyphonic ballata. It is through newly composed laude and laude-contrafacta that the ballata has its chronologically widest influence.

== Editions ==
Modern editions of the majority of the surviving ballata repertory were prepared by Nino Pirrotta in The Music of Fourteenth-Century Italy (esp. volume 8) and in Polyphonic Music of the Fourteenth Century vol. 4 (Leo Schrade, ed., the music of Francesco Landini), vol. 24 (Margaret Bent and Anne Hallmark, ed., the music of Johannes Ciconia), and throughout vols. 6-11 (W. Thomas Marrocco, ed.).

== See also ==
- Ballo
