= Francesco Landini =

Italian composer (c. 1325 – 1397)

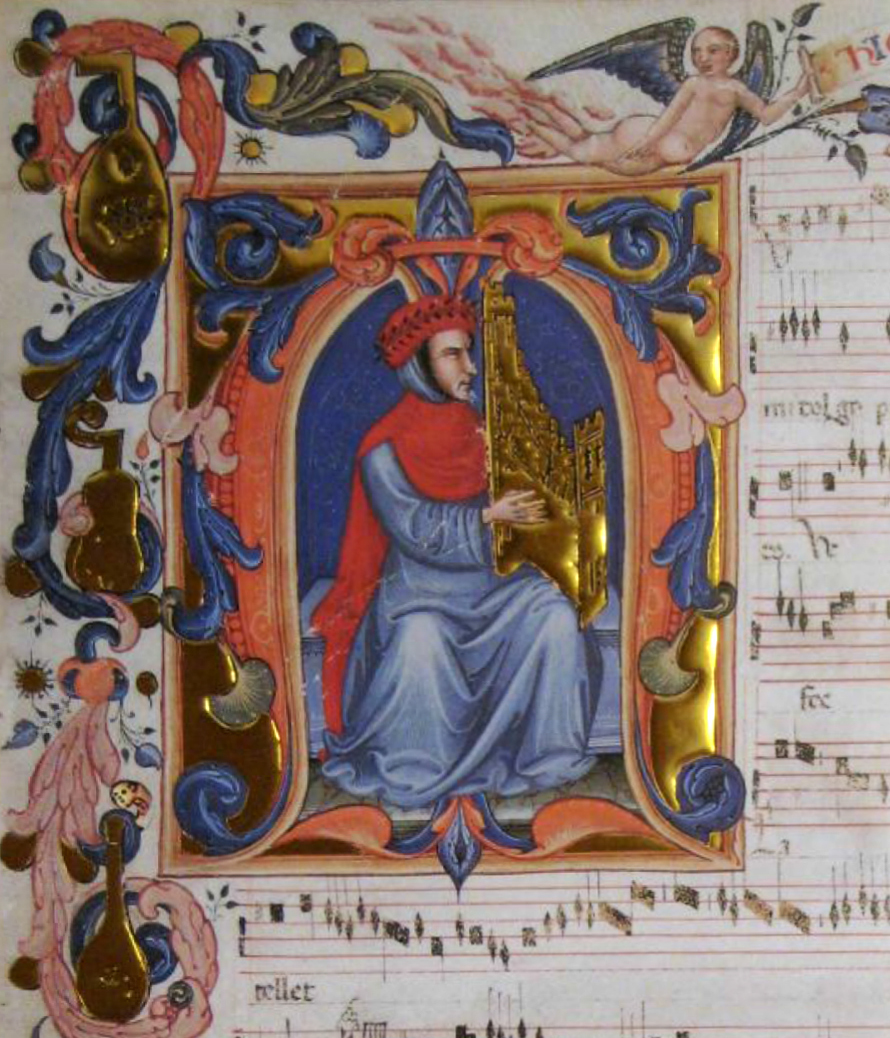
Detail of Landini wearing a corona laurea while playing an organetto in an illustration from the 15th-century Squarcialupi Codex I-Fl 87, f. 121v.

Francesco Landini (c. 1325 or 1335 – 2 September 1397; also known by many names) was a Florentine composer, poet, organist, singer and instrument maker, and a central figure of the music of the Trecento in the Italian peninsula.

== Name ==
Francesco's name is recorded in many variants throughout medieval manuscripts and documents, including, Francesco degli Organi, Francesco il Cieco, Francesco da Firenze, Magister Franciscus de Florentia, Magister Franciscus Coecus Horghanista de Florentia (in the Squarcialupi Codex), Francesco degli orghani and Cechus de Florentia.

Modern scholars no longer accept the idea that he was a member of the Landini family and prefer to use the names "Francesco degli Organi" or "Francesco degli orghani" (Francesco of the organs), "Francesco da Firenze'"(Francesco of Firenze), and "Francesco il Cieco" or "Franciscus cecus" (Francesco the blind) to refer to the composer. The surname "Landini" or "Landino" has not been linked to the composer in any sources of the 14th century nor in secondary references in the 15th century. The evidence linking him to the Landini family via his presumed father, who was identified by Filippo Villani as a painter who lived a simple life is no longer accepted by art historians. It can therefore also no longer be maintained that the painter Jacopo del Casentino (formerly also referred to as "Jacopo Landino") was his father or that Cristoforo Landino was his great-nephew. It was Cristoforo's naming of Francesco as an ancestor when he connected himself to an ancestor "Lando di Nato," taking on the family name of "Landini" that has influenced centuries of scholars to call the composer Francesco Landini or Landino.

== Context and sources ==
Details of Francesco's life are sketchy and few facts can be established with certainty, but the general outline has begun to take shape as more research has been done, especially into Florentine records. Most of the original biographical data on him comes from a 1385 book on famous Florentine citizens by the chronicler Filippo Villani, who was also born approximately 1325.

== Life and career ==
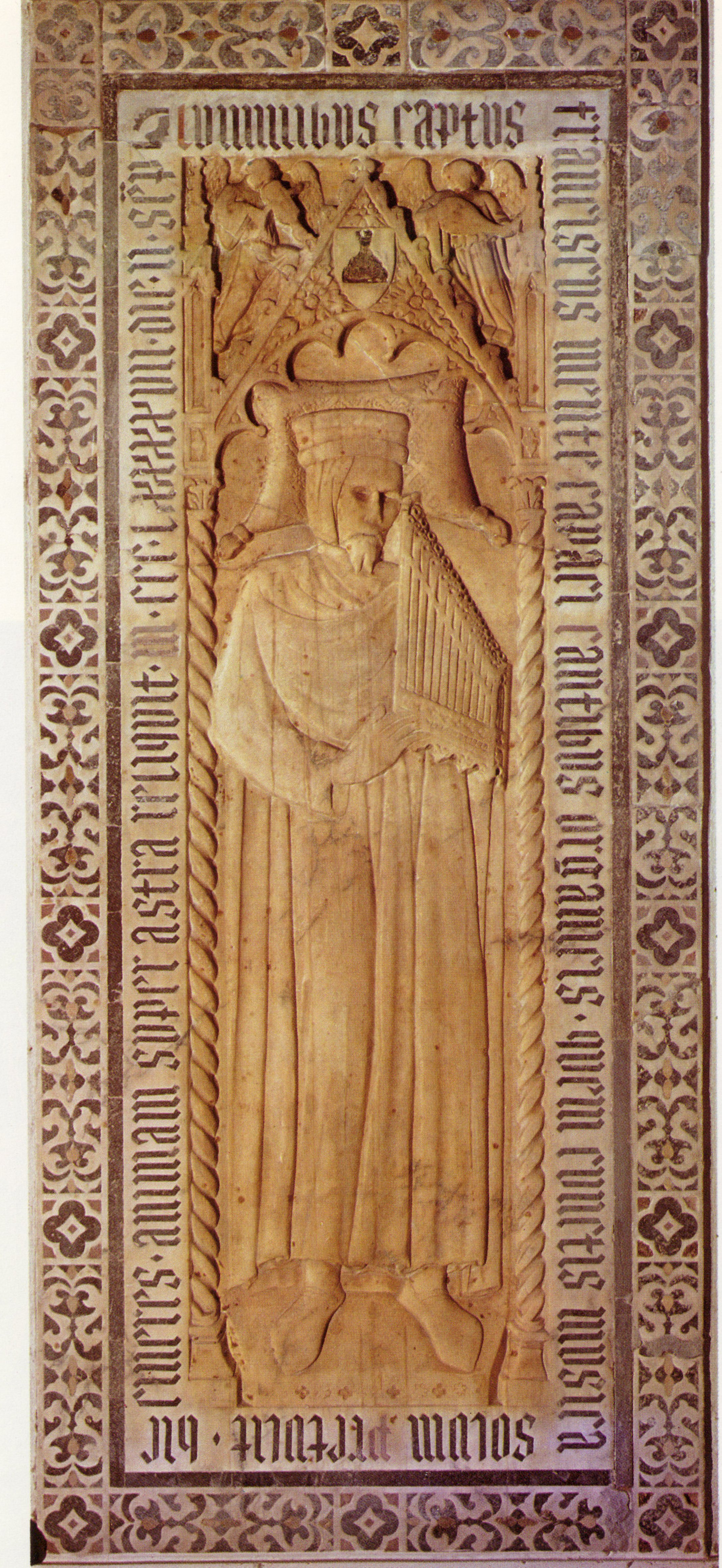
Landini's tombstone with him shown playing a portative organ

Landini was most likely born in Florence, though Cristoforo Landino gave his birthplace as Fiesole. Blind from childhood (an effect of contracting smallpox), Landini became devoted to music early in life, and mastered many instruments, including the lute, as well as the art of singing, writing poetry, and composition. Villani, in his chronicle, also stated that Francesco was an inventor of instruments, including a stringed instrument called the 'syrena syrenarum', that combined features of the lute and psaltery, and it is believed to be the ancestor of the bandura.

Despite his young age, Landini was already active in the early 1350s and it is likely that he was very close to Petrarch. According to Villani, Francesco was given a crown of laurel by the King of Cyprus, who was in Venice for several periods during the 1360s. Landini probably spent some time in northern Italy prior to 1370. Evidence in some of his music also points to this: a motet by a certain "Franciscus" is dedicated to Andrea Contarini, who was Doge of Venice from 1368 to 1382; and in addition, his works are well represented in northern Italian sources.

He was employed as organist at the Florentine monastery of Santa Trinità in 1361, and at the church of San Lorenzo from 1365 onward. He was heavily involved in the political and religious controversies of his day, according to Villani, but he seems to have remained in the good graces of the Florentine authorities. Landini knew many of the other Italian composers of the Trecento, including Lorenzo da Firenze, with whom he was associated at Santa Trinità, as well as Andreas da Florentia, whom he knew in the 1370s. Around or shortly after 1375, Andreas hired him as a consultant to help build the organ at the Servite house in Florence. Among the surviving records are the receipts for the wine that the two consumed during the three days it had taken to tune the instrument. Landini also helped build the new organ at SS Annunziata in 1379, and in 1387 he was involved in yet another organ-building project, this time at Florence Cathedral.

He is buried in the church of San Lorenzo in Florence. His tombstone, lost until the 19th century and now again displayed in the church, contains a depiction of him with a portative organ.

== Music ==
External audio
- Ecco la primavera performed by Alkemie
- Ecco la primavera

Landini was the most prolific composer of the Italian Trecento style, sometimes also called the "Italian ars nova". His output was almost exclusively secular. While there are records that he composed sacred music, none of it has survived. What have survived are eighty-nine ballate for two voices, forty-two ballate for three voices, and another nine which exist in both two and three-voice versions. In addition to the ballate, a smaller number of madrigals have survived. Landini is assumed to have written his own texts for many of his works. His output, preserved most completely in the Squarcialupi Codex, represents almost a quarter of all surviving 14th-century Italian music.

== Legacy ==
Numerous contemporary writers attest to his fame, not only as a composer, but as a singer, poet, organist, philosopher, and passionately devoted citizen of Florence, notably Giovanni da Prato, in his book Paradiso degli Alberti. This book, written in 1389 contains short stories, one of which supposedly was related by Landini himself. His reputation for moving an audience with his music was so powerful that writers noted "the sweetness of his melodies was such that hearts burst from their bosoms."

Landini is the eponym of the Landini cadence (or Landino sixth), a cadential formula whereby the sixth degree of the scale (the submediant) is inserted between the leading note and its resolution on the tonic. However this cadence neither originated with him, nor is it unique to his music; it can be found in much polyphonic music of the period, and well into the 15th century (for example in the songs of Gilles Binchois). Gherardello da Firenze is the earliest composer to use the cadence whose works have survived. Yet Landini used the formula consistently throughout his music, so the eponym—which dates from after the medieval era—is appropriate.
