= Medieval music =

Western music created during the Middle Ages

Medieval music encompasses the sacred and secular music of Western Europe during the Middle Ages, from approximately the 6th to 15th centuries. It is the first and longest major era of Western classical music and is followed by the Renaissance music; the two eras comprise what musicologists generally term as early music, preceding the common practice period. Following the traditional division of the Middle Ages, medieval music can be divided into Early (500–1150), High (1150–1300), and Late (1300–1400) medieval music.

Medieval music includes liturgical music used for the church, other sacred music, and secular or non-religious music. Much medieval music is purely vocal music, such as Gregorian chant. Other music used only instruments or both voices and instruments (typically with the instruments accompanying the voices).

The medieval period saw the creation and adaptation of systems of music notation which enabled creators to document and transmit musical ideas more easily, although notation coexisted with and complemented oral tradition.

== Background ==
=== Origins ===
==== Greco-Roman ====
De Institutione Musica (c. 510) by Boethius (480–524) taught the medievals ancient Greek and Roman music, such as Pythagorean tuning.

==== Christian ====
Tubal-cain depicted as the founder of music by Andrea di Bonaiuto.

The fall of Rome (c. 476) also saw the rise of Christianity, after the conversion of emperor Constantine the Great (272–337). (Note: Constantine issued the Edict of Milan (313) tolerating Christianity and Theodosius I (347–395) issued the Edict of Thessalonica (380) making it the official religion of Rome.)

Christians versed in the Bible attributed the invention of music to Jubal, "the father of all who play stringed instruments and pipes" in Genesis 4:21. Horns are added when God commands Moses to forge two silver trumpets in Numbers 10:2. Jubal's half-brother, the first smith Tubal-cain, is also given the title of inventor of music, from copying errors, and a Christian retelling of the story of Pythagorean hammers.

King David's retinue with the Ark of the Covenant includes Heman and Jeduthun, who 1 Chronicles 16:42 states "were responsible for the sounding of the trumpets and cymbals and for the playing of the other instruments for sacred song." In 1 Chronicles 25:1: "David, together with the commanders of the army, set apart some of the sons of Asaph, Heman and Jeduthun for the ministry of prophesying, accompanied by harps, lyres and cymbals." The Psalms are attributed to them.

Hilary of Poitiers (c. 310–c. 367) and Saint Ambrose of Milan (c. 339–397) were pioneers of Latin hymns. Isidore of Seville (c. 560–636), described by historian Charles Forbes René de Montalembert (1810–1870), as "the last scholar of the ancient world", also wrote extensively on music.

=== Instruments ===
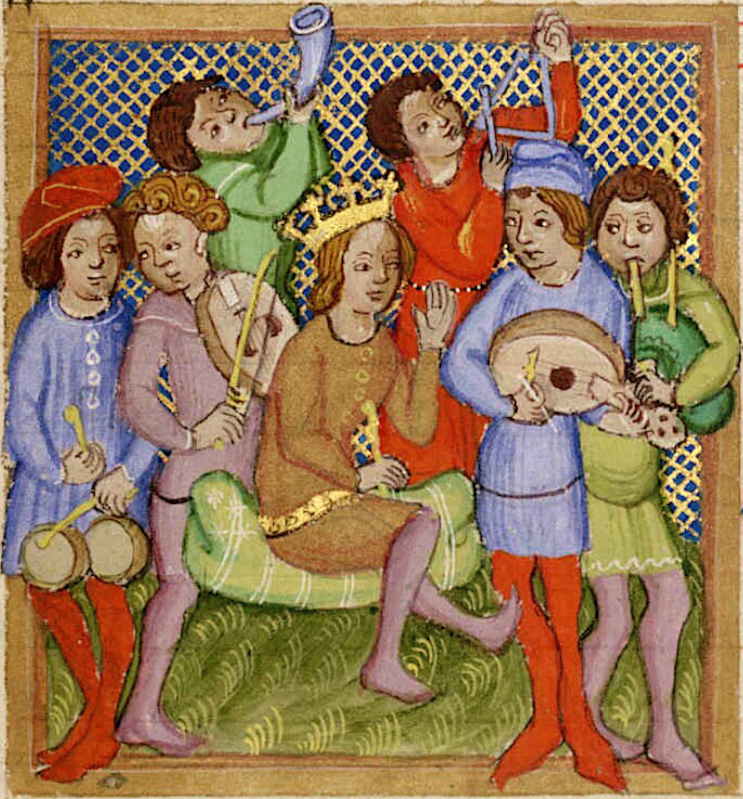
King David and musicians

As well as singing, many instruments used to perform medieval music still exist today, but in different and typically more technologically developed forms.

==== Brass ====
There were medieval brass horns or trumpets such as the buisine and arguably slide trumpet precursors to the modern trombone (called the sackbut).

==== Woodwind ====
The flute was made of wood in the medieval era rather than silver or other metal, and could be made as a side-blown or end-blown instrument (e. g. tibia). While modern orchestral flutes are usually made of metal and have complex key mechanisms and airtight pads, medieval flutes had holes that the performer had to cover with the fingers (as with the recorder). The recorder was made of wood during the medieval era rather than synthetic materials such as plastic, it has more or less retained its past form.

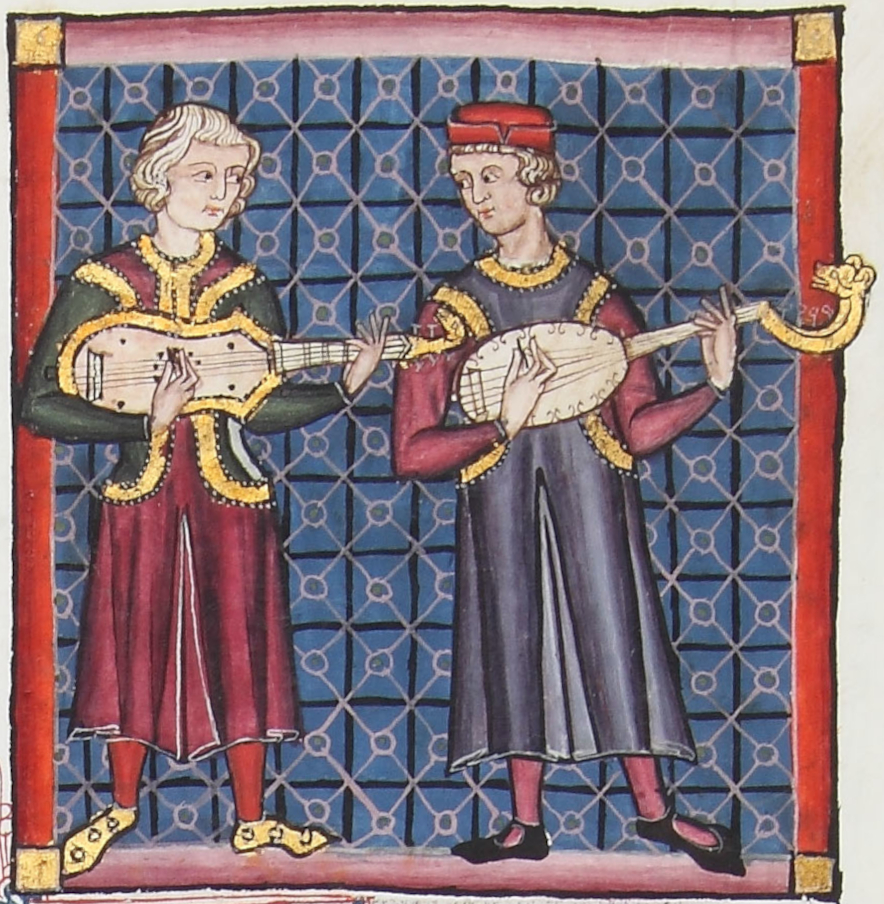
Musicians from the Cantigas de Santa Maria, Castile/Spain, c. 1300–1340. On the left is a guitarra latina and on the right is a guitarra morisca.

The gemshorn is similar to the recorder as it has finger holes on its front, though it is actually a member of the ocarina family. One of the flute's predecessors, the pan flute, was popular in medieval times, and is possibly of Hellenic origin. This instrument's pipes were made of wood, and were graduated in length to produce different pitches.

Early versions of the pipe organ such as the water organ also existed. In 666, Pope Vitalian introduced the organ in Rome. In 757, Byzantine emperor Constantine V (718–775) sent an organ as a gift to Carolingian King of the Franks Pippin the Short (c. 714–768), and in 826 an organ was installed in Aachen “after the art of the Greeks”. There was also the smaller portative organ.

==== String ====
Medieval music used many plucked or strummed string instruments like the lute, with a fretted neck and pear-shaped, hollow body, which evolved from the oud and is the predecessor to the modern guitar. There was also the monochord, citole, and mandore, which evolved from the gittern, as well as the guitarra latina and guitarra morisca.

There was also the harp and the psaltery (e. g. rotte), a predecessor to the modern zither. There are no evidence in images or sculpture to "suggest the existence of harps in western Europe" between the 4th century BC and late 8th century AD, until those depicted in the Dagulf Psalter (795) and Utrecht Psalter. Harps were the preferred instrument of medieval Celts.

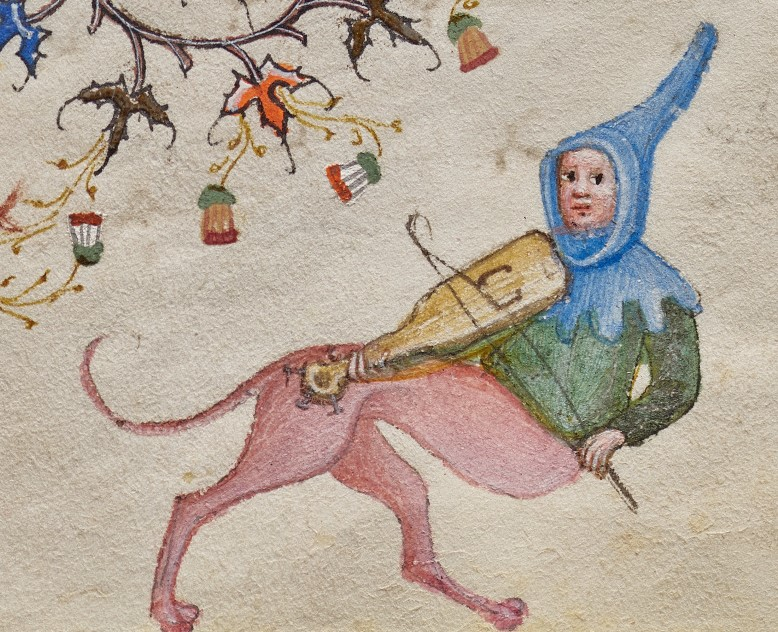
A creature plays the vielle in the margins of the Hours of Charles the Noble, a book which contains 180 depictions of medieval instruments, probably more than any other book of hours.

The bowed lyra of the Byzantine Empire was the first recorded European bowed string instrument. Like the modern violin, a performer produced sound by moving a bow with tensioned hair over tensioned strings. The Persian geographer Ibn Khurradadhbih of the 9th century (d. 911) cited the Byzantine lyra in his lexicographical discussion of instruments, as a bowed instrument equivalent to the Arab rabāb and a typical instrument of the Byzantines along with the urghun (organ), shilyani (probably a type of harp or lyre) and the salandj (probably a bagpipe).

The bowed rebec and monochord tromba marina were popular in the Middle Ages, and the vielle was similar to a large violin. The hurdy-gurdy (such as the organistrum) is a mechanical violin using a rosined wooden wheel attached to a crank to "bow" its strings. The Swedish nyckelharpa is similar to a mix between the vielle and hurdy-gurdy.

Instruments without sound boxes like the Jew's harp were also popular, introduced by the time of the Crusades.

==== Percussion ====
Percussions instruments during the medieval period include bells, chimes, cymbals, drums, and triangles.

=== Neumatic notation ===
During the medieval period the foundation was laid for a comprehensive music notational system, shaping Western music into the norms that developed during the common practice era. The earliest medieval music did not have any kind of notational system. The tunes were primarily monophonic (a single melody without accompaniment) and transmitted by oral tradition.

As Rome tried to centralize the various liturgies and establish the Roman rite as the primary church tradition, the need to transmit these chant melodies across vast distances effectively was equally glaring. So long as music could only be taught to people "by ear," it limited the ability of the church to get different regions to sing the same melodies, since each new person would have to spend time with a person who already knew a song and learn it "by ear."

A sample of Kýrie Eléison XI (Orbis Factor) from the Liber Usualis. The modern "neumes" on the staff above the text indicate the pitches of the melody. Listen to it interpreted.

The most notable form of early music notation uses dots and various signs written above the chant texts' lyrics, with some dots higher or lower, to indicate the way the melody's pitch changes, called neumes.

This basic neumatic notation served as a mere memory aid for a singer who already knew the melody. It could only specify the number of notes and whether they moved up or down. There was no way to indicate exact pitch, any rhythm, or even the starting note. A singer reading a chant text with neume markings would not be able to sight read a song which he or she had never heard sung before, passed down by oral tradition; these pieces would not be possible to interpret accurately today without later versions in more precise notation systems.

However, even though it started as a mere memory aid, the worth of having more specific notation soon became evident.

==== History ====
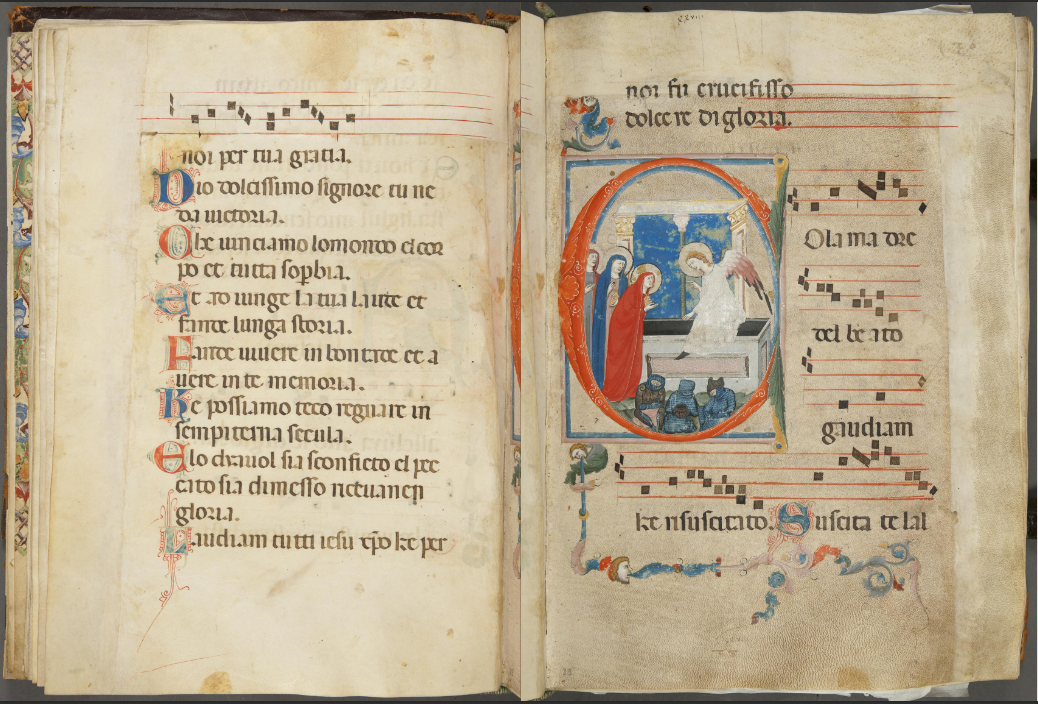
Excerpt from the Laudario Magliabechiano, an Italian manuscript

Neumatic notation seems to have developed no earlier than the eighth century, but by the ninth it was firmly established as the primary method of musical notation. Its origin is unclear and subject to some debate; however, most scholars agree that their closest ancestors are the classic Greek and Roman grammatical signs that indicated important points of declamation by recording the rise and fall of the voice.

The two basic signs of the classical grammarians were the acutus, /, indicating a raising of the voice, and the gravis, \, indicating a lowering of the voice. A singer reading a chant text with neume markings would be able to get a general sense of whether the melody line went up in pitch, stayed the same, or went down in pitch. Since trained singers knew the chant repertoire well, written neume markings above the text served as a reminder of the melody but did not specify the actual intervals.

==== Virga and punctum ====
These neumes eventually evolved into the basic symbols for neumatic notation, the virga (or "rod") which indicates a higher note and still looked like the acutus from which it came; and the punctum (or "dot") which indicates a lower note and, as the name suggests, reduced the gravis symbol to a point. Thus the acutus and the gravis could be combined to represent graphical vocal inflections on the syllable.

==== Ligatures ====
A breve.

The basic notation of the virga and the punctum remained the symbols for individual notes, but other neumes soon developed which showed several notes joined together. These new neumes—called ligatures—are essentially combinations of the two original signs, including breves (double whole note), longa (quadruple whole note), and two longae or a maxima (octuple whole note).

The value of the longa was in common usage. A ligature that began with a longa was said to lack "propriety", while ligatures ending with a longa possessed "perfection", since in the view of that era a "proper and perfect" rhythmic sequence was the succession of a brevis followed by a longa.

As a result, there were four possible ligature types: those beginning with a brevis and ending with a longa, which had both propriety and perfection; the reverse, which had neither; those both beginning and ending with a longa, which lacked propriety but had perfection; and those beginning and ending with a brevis, which were proper but not perfect. The theoretical value of a maximodus perfectus could only be written with three longae or a maxima plus a longa.

==== Heighted ====
The next development in musical notation was "heighted neumes", in which neumes were carefully placed at different heights in relation to each other. This allowed the neumes to give a rough indication of the size of a given interval as well as the direction. This quickly led to one or two lines, each representing a particular note, being placed on the music with all of the neumes relating to the earlier ones. At first, these lines had no particular meaning and instead had a letter placed at the beginning indicating which note was represented.

=== Staff ===
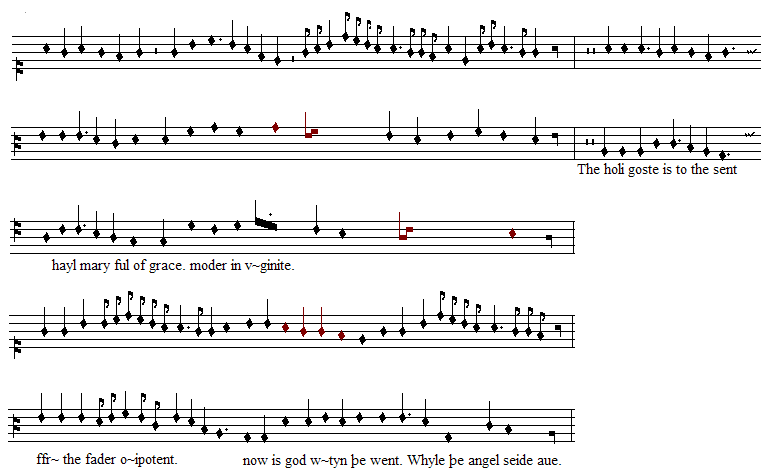
An example of mensural notation

However, the lines indicating middle C and the F a fifth below slowly became most common. Having been at first merely scratched on the parchment, the lines now were drawn in two different colored inks: usually red for F, and yellow or green for C. This was the beginning of the musical staff.

The completion of the four-line staff is usually credited to Micrologus (c. 1026) author Guido d'Arezzo (c. 1000–1050), one of the most important musical theorists of the Middle Ages. (Note: While older sources attribute the development of the staff to Guido, some modern scholars suggest that he acted more as a codifier of a system that was already being developed.) This new notation allowed a singer to learn pieces completely unknown to him in a much shorter amount of time.

However, the neumatic notational system, even in its fully developed state, did not clearly define any kind of rhythm for the singing of notes, and thus the rhythmical practice of this early music is subject to debate among scholars. The subsequent notational system incorporating rhythm is known as mensural notation, which includes color. (Note: There was also tablature notation for certain instruments.)

=== Church modes ===
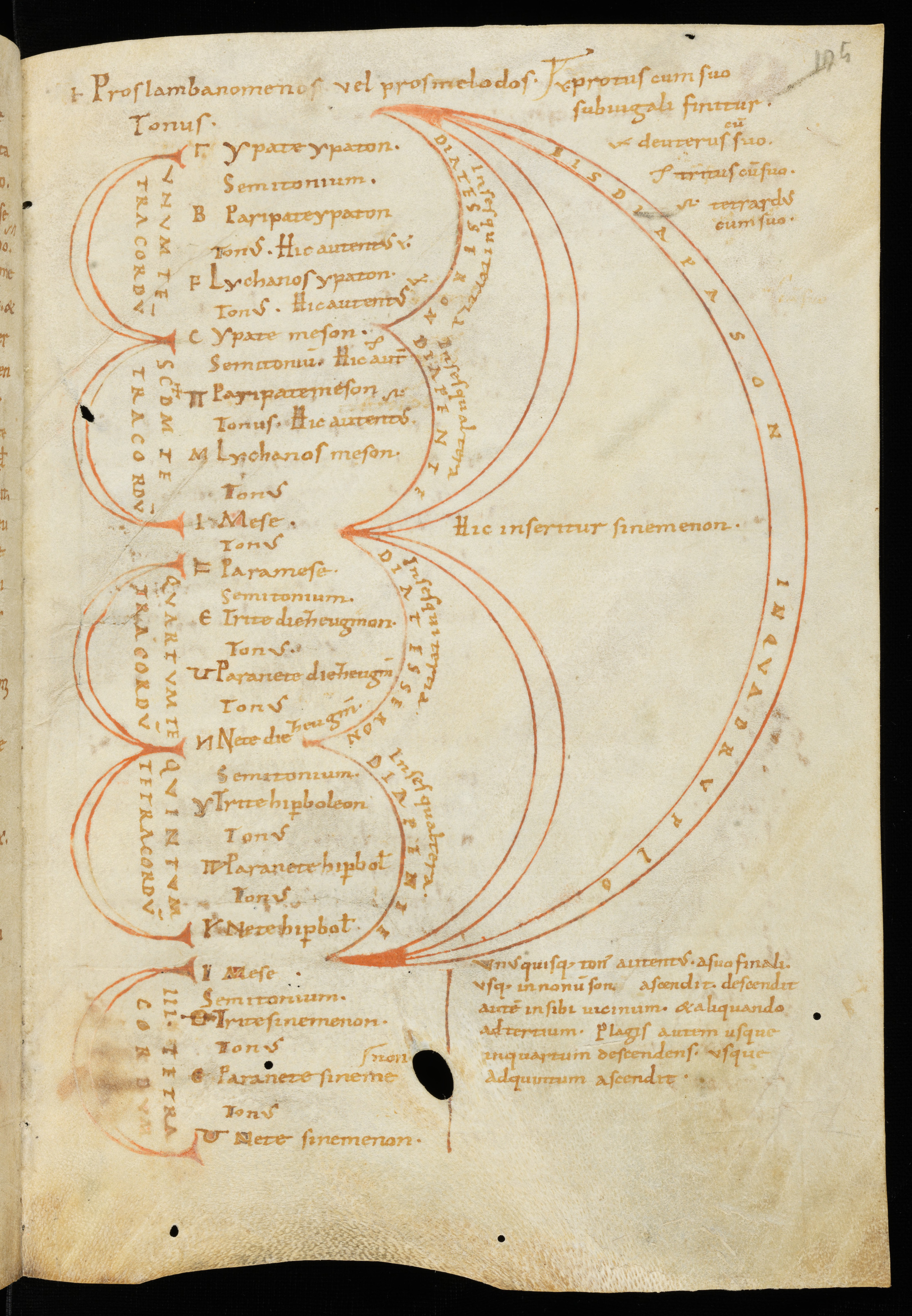
Hucbald's Musica, page 125 in the Codex 169(468) from the Abbey library of Saint Gall

An important element of medieval music theory was the system by which pitches were arranged and understood. During the Middle Ages, this systematic arrangement of a series of whole steps and half steps, what we now call a scale, was known as a mode, insomuch that it provided the rules and material for melodic writing.

The eight church modes are: Dorian, Hypodorian, Phrygian, Hypophrygian, Lydian, Hypolydian, Mixolydian, and Hypomixolydian. These ecclesiastical modes, although they have Greek names, have little relationship to the ancient modes (tonoi) as set out by Greek theorists, or contemporary modes still with Greek names. Rather, most of the terminology seems to be a misappropriation on the part of the medieval theorists.

Although the church modes have no relation to the ancient Greek modes, the overabundance of Greek terminology does point to an interesting possible origin in the liturgical melodies of the Byzantine tradition. This system is called octoechos and is also divided into eight categories, called echoi.

==== Final, reciting tone, and range ====
Much of the information concerning modes and their practical application was codified by Johannes Afflighemensis (fl. c. 1100). In his work he describes three defining elements to each mode: the final (or finalis), the reciting tone (tenor or confinalis), and the range (or ambitus). The finalis is the tone that serves as the focal point for the mode and, as the name suggests, is almost always used as the final tone. The reciting tone is the tone that serves as the primary focal point in the melody (particularly internally). It is generally also the tone most often repeated in the piece, and finally the range delimits the upper and lower tones for a given mode. The eight modes can be further divided into four categories based on their final (finalis).

Medieval theorists called these pairs maneriae and labeled them according to the Greek ordinal numbers. Those modes that have d, e, f, and g as their final are put into the groups protus, deuterus, tritus, and tetrardus respectively. These can then be divided further based on whether the mode is "authentic" or "plagal." These distinctions deal with the range of the mode in relation to the final. The authentic modes have a range that is about an octave (one tone above or below is allowed) and start on the final, whereas the plagal modes, while still covering about an octave, start a perfect fourth below the authentic. Another interesting aspect of the modal system is the use of "Musica ficta" which allows pitches to be altered (changing B♮ to B♭ for example) in certain contexts regardless of the mode. These changes have several uses, but one that seems particularly common is to avoid melodic difficulties caused by the tritone.

== Early medieval music (500–1150) ==
Medieval music was created for a number of different uses and contexts, resulting in different music genres. Liturgical as well as more general sacred contexts were important, such as monophonic (single, unaccompanied melody) Gregorian Chant, but secular types emerged as well, including love songs and dances.

The music theory of the medieval period also saw several advances over previous practices, both in regard to tonal material, texture, and rhythm, including polyphony and church modes.

=== Chant ===
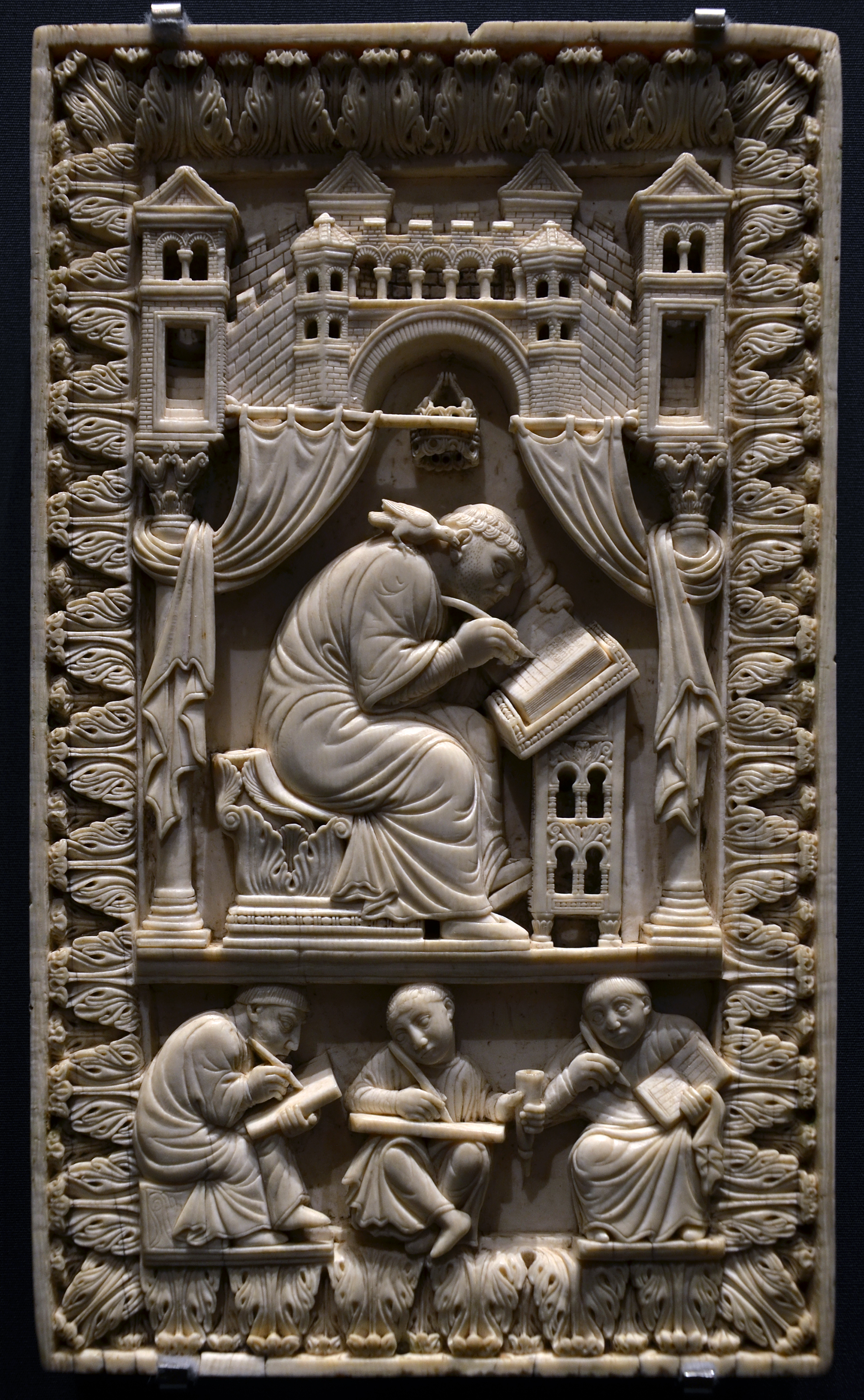
Ivory relief showing Pope Gregory I with holy spirit in the form of a dove speaking in his ear (c. 10th century).

Chant (or plainsong) is a monophonic sacred music form and the first known of the Christian church and Early Middle Ages. Chant developed separately in several European places including Hispania (now Spain and Portugal), the Italian Peninsula (now Italy), Gaul (now France), and the British Isles (now Ireland and Great Britain); all to support the regional liturgies when celebrating the Mass, each with its own rules.

Hispania had Mozarabic chant, which survived through Muslim rule (711–1492), though this was an isolated strand and this music was later suppressed to enforce conformity on the entire liturgy.

In Milan, the standard was Ambrosian chant, preferring antiphon to responsories, while Beneventan chant developed around Benevento in Campania. Gallican chant was sung in Gaul, and Celtic chant was in the British Isles.

==== Gregorian Chant ====
The reigning Carolingian dynasty wanted to standardize the Mass and chant across its Frankish Empire. At this time, Rome was the religious centre of western Europe, and northern Gaul and the Rhineland (most notably Aachen) was the political centre. The Carolingian Renaissance saw a standardization effort consisting mainly of combining the two – Roman and Gallican – regional liturgies. Charlemagne (748–814) sent trained singers throughout the Empire to teach this new form of chant.

This body of chant became known as Gregorian Chant, named after Pope Gregory I (c. 540–604), such as in the song In Paradisum (c. 9th century). Gregorian chant was said to be collected and codified during his papacy or even composed by himself, inspired by the Holy Spirit in the form of a dove. (Note: While this was only a popular legend to legitimize the efforts of the Carolingians, and Gregorian chant certainly did not exist in Gregory's time, it is possible, nevertheless, that Gregory's papacy contributed to collecting and codifying the Roman chant of the time which then, in the 9th and 10th centuries, formed – alongside the Gallican chant – one of the two roots of the Gregorian chant.) By the 12th century, Gregorian chant had superseded all the other Western chant traditions, with the exception of the Ambrosian chant in Milan and the Mozarabic chant in a few specially designated Spanish chapels. Gregorian Chants were kept in tonaries, such as those by Odo of Arezzo (fl. late 10th century).

Deeply influenced by Boethius, Hucbald (c. 850–930), a near contemporary of Aurelian of Réôme and Stephen of Liège, wrote Musica (c. 880), aiming to reconcile ancient Greek music theory with chant, using many notated examples, following the church modes.

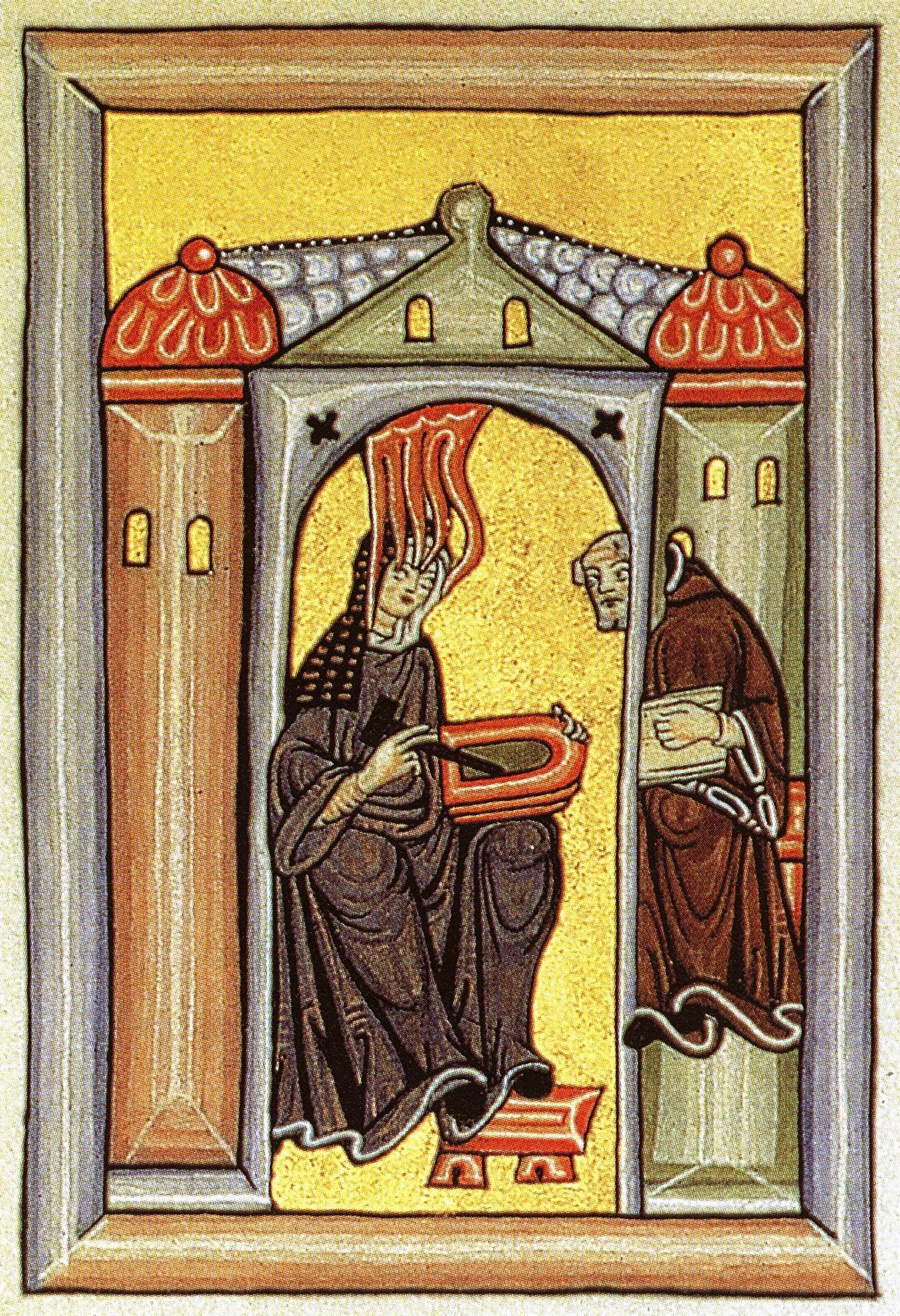
Hildegard of Bingen, one of the best-known composers of sacred monophony

A dozen chants honoring Saint Martin of Tours (c. 336–397) are attributed to Odo of Cluny (c. 878–942). Heriger of Lobbes (c. 925–1007) wrote chants and was described as "skilled in the art of music".

Fulbert of Chartres (c. 960–1028) was responsible for reconstruction after Chartres Cathedral burned in 1020. The Antiphonary of St. Benigne has an alphabetic notation invented by Italian William of Volpiano (962–1031), who built Mont-Saint-Michel.

Victimae paschali laudes is attributed to Wipo of Burgundy (c. 995–c. 1050), chaplain to Holy Roman Emperor Conrad II (c. 990–1039). Hermann of Reichenau (1013–1054) has been debatably credited with the hymns "Salve Regina", "Veni Sancte Spiritus", and "Alma Redemptoris Mater". At St. Emmeram's in Regensburg, Arnold and Otloh (c. 1010–c. 1072) were opponents of philosophy who preferred music. By the twelfth century, all the monks at St. Emmeram's were illiterate.

However, Hildegard von Bingen (1098–1179) was literate and one of the earliest known female composers. She wrote many monophonic works for the Catholic Church, almost all of them for female voices. She has been recognized as one of the Middle Ages best musicians and composers ever since Gothic Voices recorded A Feather on the Breath of God (1982), for instance the song Columba Aspexit.

The songs of hermit Saint Godric (c. 1065–1170), born around the time of the Norman Conquest (1066), are the earliest surviving songs in English with musical notation. He slept on the ground, and had no apparent influences, claiming his music was sung to him by Mary herself. (Note: The novel Godric (1981) by Frederick Buechner is a fictional retelling of his life and travels. It was a finalist for a Pulitzer Prize.)

=== Liturgical drama ===
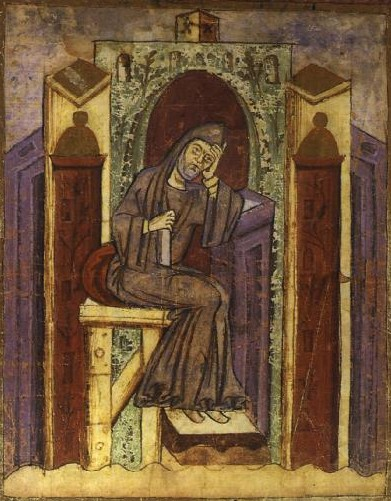
Notker the Stammerer

An advancement of chant originating during the early Middle Ages was the liturgical drama, sung widely in Ottonian Renaissance Northern Europe (919–1024), which developed tropes and sequences, notably influenced by such hymn composers as Notker the Stammerer (c. 840–912) and Tutilo (d. 915), at St. Gall in Switzerland.

Liturgical drama and tropes developed possibly in the 10th century from the poetic embellishments of the liturgical texts. One of these, the so-called Quem quaeritis, belonging to the liturgy of Easter morning, developed into a short play about The Three Marys meeting an angel at the Tomb of Jesus, around the year 950.

The liturgical drama style spread to England, where the oldest surviving written source is the Winchester Troper (c. 1000), including Proper and Ordinary chants for both the Mass and the Divine Office. Shortly after the original, similar Christmas plays with music followed, including what is conventionally referred to as mystery, miracle, and morality plays.

In contrast to secular plays, such as farces, which were more often spoken, the liturgical drama was more often sung. There is a controversy among musicologists as to the instrumental accompaniment of several such plays, given that the stage and music directions, very elaborate and precise in other respects, do not specify instruments. The most notable to have preserved sufficiently to allow modern reconstruction of singing and performance is the Play of Daniel (c. 1140).

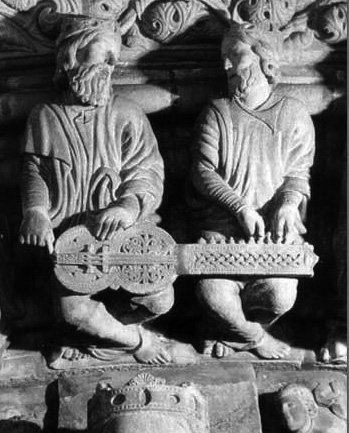
Elders of the Apocalypse playing an organistrum Santiago de Compostela, Spain

French philosopher Peter Abelard (1079–1142) composed love songs for Héloïse, and festival hymns. (Note: His love songs are now lost, and which have not been identified in the anonymous repertoire. (One known romantic poem / possible lyric remains, "Dull is the Star".) Héloïse praised these songs in a letter: "The great charm and sweetness in language and music, and a soft attractiveness of the melody obliged even the unlettered".) Abelard also wrote six biblical planctus (laments). Abelard's contemporary Adam de St. Victor (c. 1068–1146) has been described as"...the most illustrious exponent of the revival of liturgical poetry which the twelfth century affords".

Adam de St. Victor possibly taught Albertus Parisiensis, credited with creating the first known piece of European music for three voices, in the conductus Congaudeant catholici (Let all Catholics rejoice together) from the Codex Calixtinus (c. 1145), attributed to Pope Calixtus II (c. 1065–1124), and published for pilgrims following the Way of Saint James to the shrine of the apostle Saint James the Great, located in the cathedral of Santiago de Compostela, Galicia.

=== Early polyphony: organum ===
Around the end of the 9th century, singers in monasteries began experimenting with adding another part to the chant or polyphony, generally a voice in parallel motion, singing mostly at the interval of an octave, perfect fourths or fifths above the original tune.

Much of the music from this period is anonymous, found in two widely circulated treatises on music, Musica and Scolica enchiriadis (c. 9th century). This new practice is given the name organum by the author of the treatises, and represents the beginnings of counterpoint and, ultimately, harmony. The enchiriadis used Daseian notation, a system of musical notation earlier than neumes, with rotated Greek symbols.

Section of Musica enchiriadis manuscript explaining the diapason (Greek for octave).

This early polyphony is based on three simple and three compound intervals. The first group comprises fourths, fifths, and octaves; while the second group has octave-plus-fourths, octave-plus-fifths, and double octaves.

Organum can further be classified depending on the time period in which it was written. The early organum as described in the enchiriadis can be termed "strict organum". Strict organum can, in turn, be subdivided into two types: diapente (Greek for organum with a fifth) and diatesseron (Greek for organum with a fourth). However, both of these kinds of strict organum had problems with the musical rules of the time. If either of them paralleled an original chant for too long (depending on the mode) a tritone would result.

This problem was somewhat overcome with the use of a second type of organum called "free organum", distinguished by its parts not moving only in parallel motion, but in oblique, or contrary motion. This made it much easier to avoid the dreaded tritone.

==== St. Martial ====
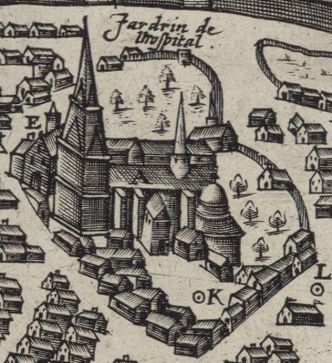
1594 drawing of Saint-Martial

Yet another type of organum was the "florid organum" around 1100, sometimes known as the school of St. Martial, (Note: Named after a monastery in south-central France, which contains the best-preserved manuscript of this repertory.) which includes Adémar de Chabannes (988–1034). In "florid organum" the original tune would be sung in long notes while an accompanying voice would sing many notes to each one of the original, often in a highly elaborate fashion, all the while emphasizing the perfect consonances (fourths, fifths and octaves), as in the earlier organa.

Another, later development of organum occurred in England, where the interval of the third was particularly favoured, and where organa were likely improvised against an existing chant melody.

== High medieval music (1150–1300) ==
The High Middle Ages saw the 12th-century renaissance.

=== The Notre Dame school ===
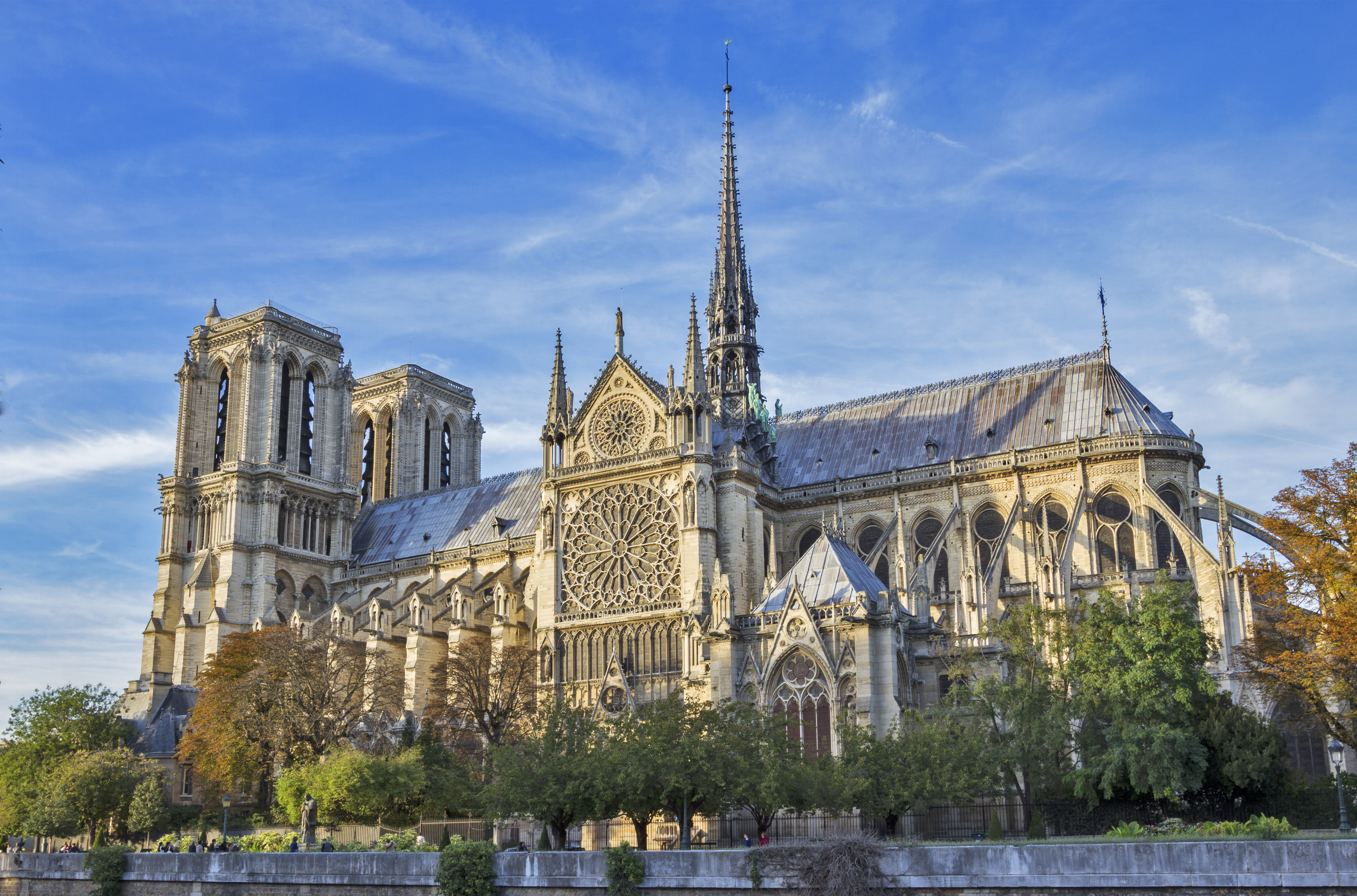
Cathedral of Notre Dame.

The final style of organum that developed was known as "melismatic organum", which was a rather dramatic departure from the rest of the polyphonic music up to this point. This new style was not note against note, but was rather one sustained line accompanied by a florid melismatic line. Melismatic organum was also incorporated by the most famous polyphonic composer of this time—Léonin (fl. 1163–1190) . He united this style with measured discant passages, which used the rhythmic modes to create the pinnacle of organum composition.

Melismatic organum is sometimes referred to as the Notre-Dame school of polyphony, or Parisian organum, since that was where Léonin, and his student Pérotin (fl. c. 1200), were stationed. The Gothic Cathedral of Notre-Dame in Paris was the centre of musical creative activity throughout the thirteenth century, influencing all subsequent styles, with the later polyphonic genera of motets starting as a trope of existing Notre-Dame organums. One loose collection of repertory is often called the Magnus Liber Organi (Great Book of Organum), known mostly from the of Anonymous IV.

This was also the period in which concepts of formal structure developed which were attentive to proportion, texture, and architectural effect. Composers of the period alternated florid and discant organum (more note-against-note, as opposed to the succession of many-note melismas against long-held notes found in the florid type), and created several new musical forms, such as the motet and clausula genres, both also often built on an original segment of plainchant or as an elaboration on an organum passage.

==== Motet ====
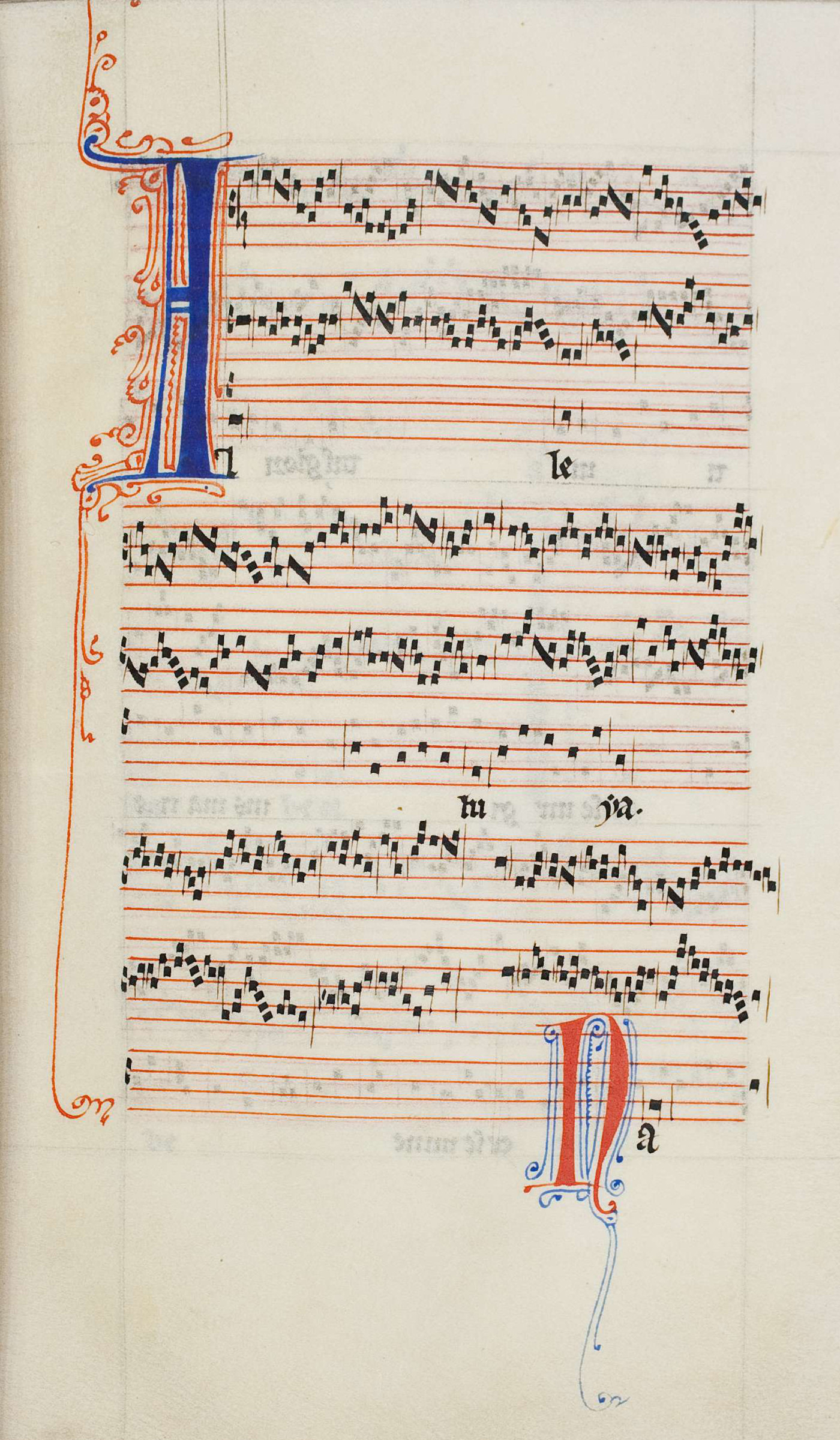
Pérotin, "Alleluia nativitas", in the third rhythmic mode

The motet, one of the most important musical forms of the high Middle Ages and Renaissance, developed initially during the Notre-Dame period out of the clausula, especially the form using multiple voices as elaborated by Pérotin, who paved the way for this particularly by replacing many of his predecessor (as canon of the cathedral) Léonin's lengthy florid clausulae with substitutes in a discant style. (Note: Pérotin influenced 20th-century neo-medieval composers such as John Luther Adams and minimalist composer Steve Reich.)

While most early motets were sacred and may have been liturgical (designed for use in a church service), by the end of the thirteenth century the genre had expanded to include secular topics, such as political satire and courtly love, and French as well as Latin texts. They also included from one to three upper voices, each with its own text.

Gradually, there came to be entire books of these substitutes, available to be fitted in and out of the various chants. Since, in fact, there were more than can possibly have been used in context, it is probable that the clausulae came to be performed independently, either in other parts of the mass, or in private devotions.

The clausula, thus practised, became the motet when troped with non-liturgical words. Surviving manuscripts from this era include the Montpellier Codex, Bamberg Codex, and Las Huelgas Codex.

==== Ars antiqua and rhythm ====
Notre-Dame school polyphony represents the beginning of what is conventionally known as Ars antiqua, the period in which rhythmic notation first appeared in western music, mainly a context-based method of rhythmic notation known as the rhythmic modes.

The first kind of written rhythmic system was based on a series of modes, codified by Johannes de Garlandia, author of the De Mensurabili Musica (c. 1250). Garlandia describes six species of mode, or six different ways in which longs and breves can be arranged. Each mode establishes a rhythmic pattern in beats (or tempora) within a common unit of three tempora (a perfectio) that is repeated again and again.

The rhythmic mode can generally be determined by the patterns of ligatures used. Once a rhythmic mode had been assigned to a melodic line, there was generally little deviation from that mode, although rhythmic adjustments could be indicated by changes in the expected pattern of ligatures, even to the extent of changing to another rhythmic mode.

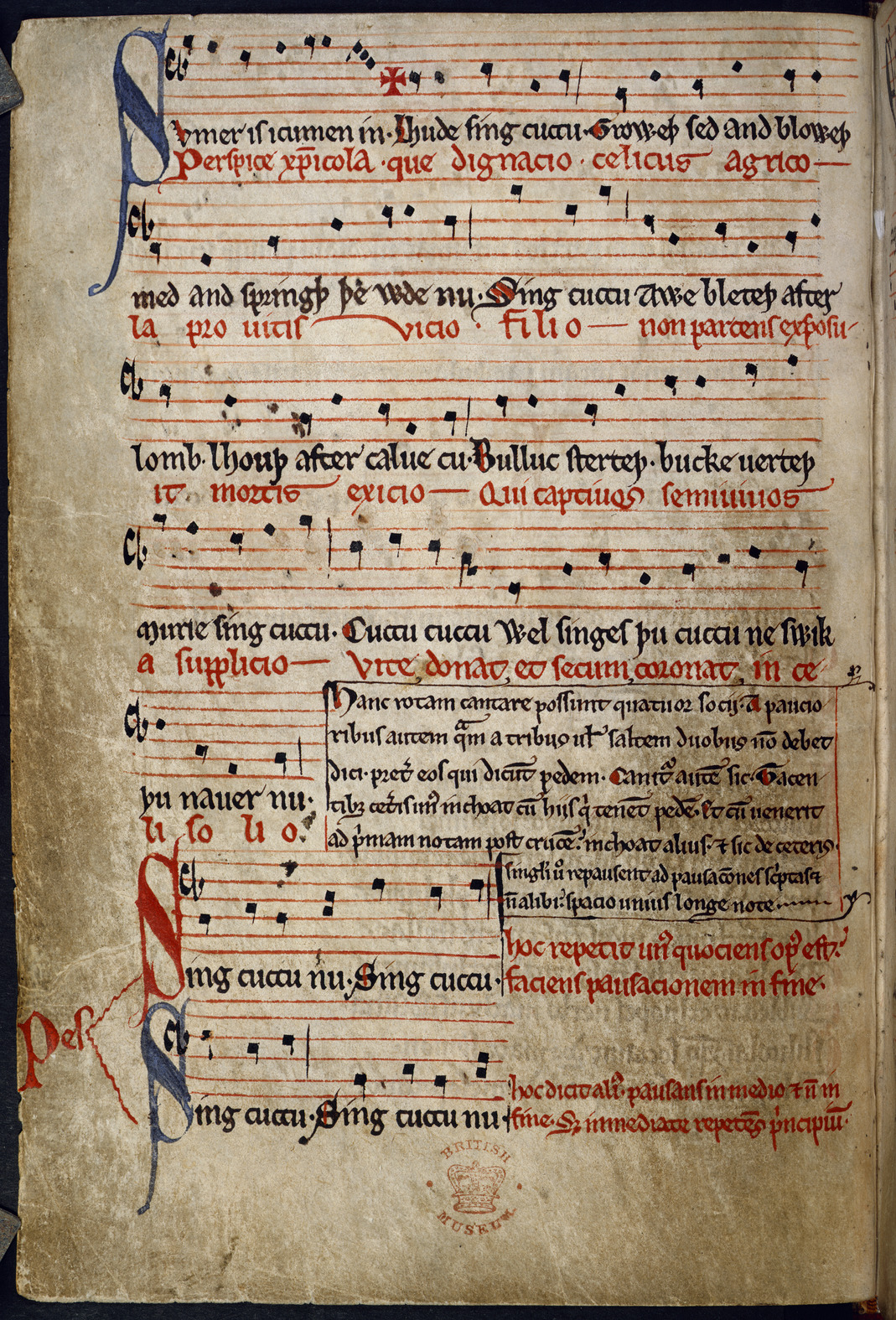
Sumer is Icumen In. Harley MS 978, folio 11v, British Library

The song Sumer is Icumen In (c. 1260) is in the Wessex dialect of Middle English; and is a round, the oldest known musical composition featuring six-part polyphony. It is sometimes attributed to W. de Wycombe.

==== Petronian motet ====
Petrus de Cruce (Pierre de la Croix, fl. 1290) is credited with the innovation of writing more than three semibreves to fit the length of a breve. Coming before the innovation of imperfect tempus, this practice inaugurated the era of what are now called "Petronian" motets. These late 13th-century works are in three to four parts and have multiple texts sung simultaneously.

Originally, the tenor line (from the Latin tenere, "to hold") held a preexisting liturgical chant line in the original Latin, while the text of the one, two, or even three voices above, called the voces organales, provided commentary on the liturgical subject either in Latin or in the vernacular French. The rhythmic values of the voces organales decreased as the parts multiplied, with the duplum (the part above the tenor) having smaller rhythmic values than the tenor, the triplum (the line above the duplum) having smaller rhythmic values than the duplum, and so on. As time went by, the texts of the voces organales became increasingly secular in nature and had less and less overt connection to the liturgical text in the tenor line.

The increasing rhythmic complexity seen in Petronian motets would be a fundamental characteristic of the 14th century, though music in France, Italy, and England would take quite different paths during that time.

Johannes de Grocheio (c. 1255–c. 1320) was the author of the treatise Ars musicae ("The Art of Music", c. 1300), which described contemporary Parisian music. Jacobus of Liège compiled the largest surviving medieval treatise on music, Speculum musicae (the Mirror of Music, c. 1325).

=== Goliards ===
The Goliards were itinerant poet-musicians of Europe from the tenth to the middle of the thirteenth century. Most were scholars or ecclesiastics, and they wrote and sang in Latin. Although many of the poems have survived, very little of the music has. They were possibly influential—even decisively so—on the troubadour–trouvère tradition which was to follow. Most of their poetry is secular and, while some of the songs celebrate religious ideals, others are frankly profane, dealing with drunkenness, debauchery and lechery. One of the most important extant sources of Goliards chansons is the Carmina Burana.

=== Troubadours ===
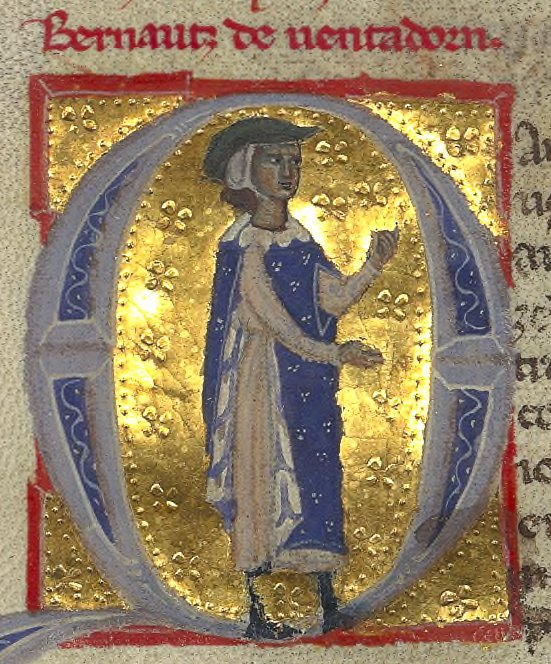
Bernart de Ventadorn

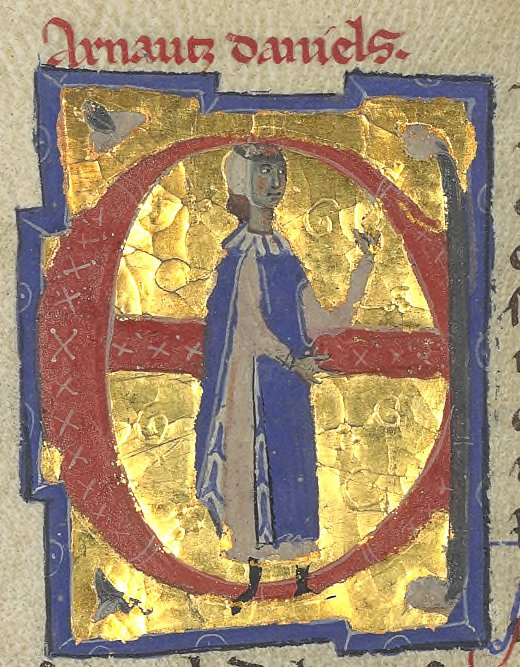
Arnaut Daniel

12th-century France saw the music of the troubadours and trouvères, a vernacular tradition of monophonic secular song, accompanied by instruments, with lyrics in Occitan (also known as the langue d'oc, or Provençal), by professional, occasionally itinerant, musicians who were also skilled poets, and sometimes knights. Troubadours have vida (a short biography) and razos (short commentaries on specific poems), by authors such as Uc de Saint Circ (fl. 1217–1253).

Typical subjects of troubadour song were birds, war, chivalry, betrayal, and unrequited courtly love. Song and poetry styles include cançons, cobla esparsa, pastorela, sirventes, gabs, and alba. Closely related to the tenso, a debate between two poets, and the partimen, a question posed by one poet and another's response, the torneyamen took place between several poets, originally usually three, initiated by Raimbaut de Vaqueiras with Ademar de Peiteus and Perdigon.

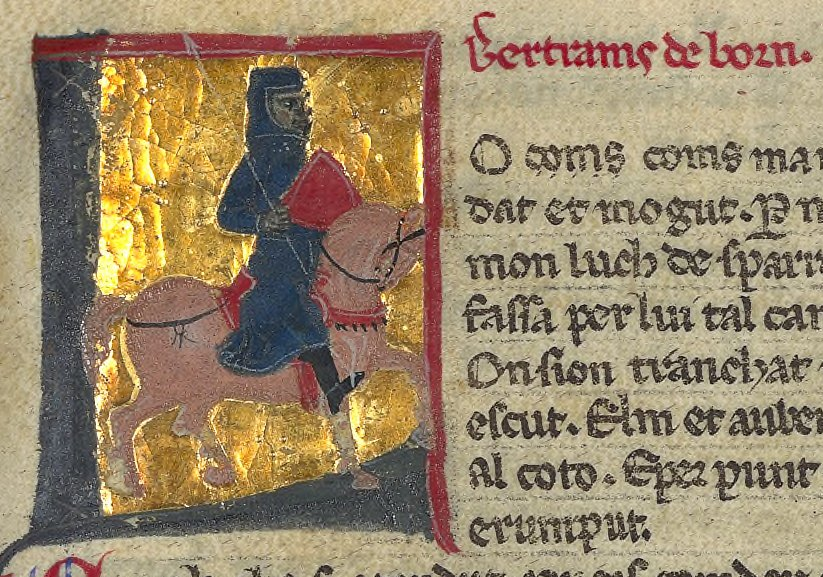
Bertran de Born as a knight.

William IX of Aquitaine (1071–1126) is the earliest known medieval troubadour. Giraut de Bornelh (c. 1138–1215) was credited as pioneer of the "light" style, or trobar leu, and called by poet Petrarch (1304–1374) the "master of the troubadours". Trobar leu master and popularizer Bernart de Ventadorn (c. 1140–c. 1200) is arguably the most important troubadour, writer of such songs as Can vei la lauzeta mover and La dousa votz.

Jaufre Rudel probably died in the Second Crusade (1147), mentioned by Marcabru (fl. 1130–1150), who pioneered the "closed" style or trobar clus, which includes Peire d'Alvernhe (c. 1130–c. 1170) and Raimbaut d'Aurenga (c. 1147–1173), parodied by Monge de Montaudon (fl. 1193–1210). Arnaut Daniel (fl. 1180–1200) invented the sestina and was a popular trobar clus composer. He was praised by Italian Dante Alighieri (1265–1321) as "the better craftsman" (miglior fabbro) and called a "grand master of love" (gran maestro d'amore) by Petrarch. (Note: He was lauded by Ezra Pound (1885–1972) in The Spirit of Romance (1910) as the greatest poet to have ever lived.)

Daniel also composed in the "rich" style or trobar ric, as did Aimeric de Peguilhan (c. 1170–c. 1230) and Raimbaut de Vaqueiras (c. 1150–1207). Blacatz (1165–1237) was the patron of trobar ric composer Peire Vidal and Sordello, and father of Blacasset (fl. 1233–1242).

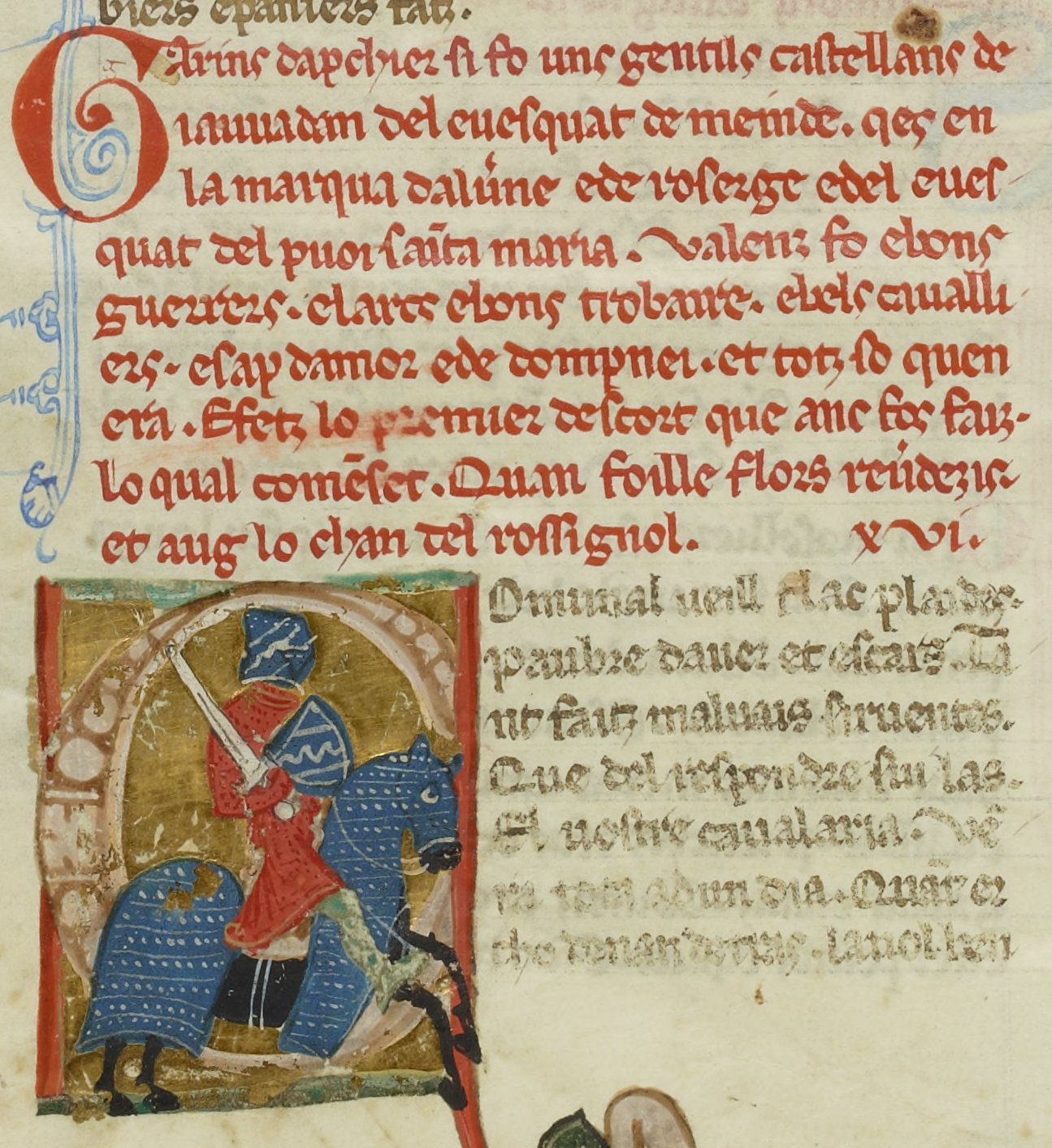
Garin d'Apchier in a 13th-century manuscript

Gaucelm Faidit (c. 1156–c. 1209) was at the court of Richard the Lionhearted, for whose death he wrote a famous planh (lament) in 1199. Bertran de Born (c. 1145–c. 1215) was a baron involved in revolts against Richard and then Phillip II, writing songs encouraging Aimar V of Limoges and others to rebel. Jordan Bonel was in the court of Alfonso II of Aragon.

Folquet de Marselha (c. 1150–1231) became a Cistercian monk and the bishop of Toulouse. Arnaut de Mareuil was sung by Pistoleta (fl. 1185–1228). The Comtessa de Dia (fl. c. 1175–c. 1212) was a trobairitz, or female troubadour, notable for the song A chantar m'er de so q'ieu no volria (I must sing of what I'd rather not). Daude de Pradas (fl. 1214–1282) wrote a planh for Uc Brunet (fl. 1190–1220).

There were also non-noble jongleurs such as Guilhem Magret, Martin Codax, Peire Raimon de Tolosa, and Peirol. Albertet de Sestaro and Perdigon were jongleurs from youth. Gascon troubadour Guiraut de Calanso (fl. 1202–1212) stated that the jongleur should play on the citole, mandore, and the monochord.

Castellan and troubadour Garin d'Apchier invented the descort genre of lyric poetry. Guiraut Riquier (c. 1230–1292) is among the last of the Occitan troubadours.

Additional troubadours include Aimeric de Belenoi, Berenguier de Palazol, Gui d'Ussel, Guilhem Ademar, Guilhem Augier Novella, Guilhem de Saint Leidier, Guiraut d'Espanha, Pons d'Ortaffa, Pons de Capduoill, Raimon Jordan, and Rigaut de Berbezilh.

==== Trouvères ====
Adam de la Halle

The period of the troubadours wound down after the Albigensian Crusade (1209–1229), the fierce campaign by Pope Innocent III to eliminate the Cathar heresy (and northern barons' desire to appropriate the wealth of the south). Peire Cardenal (c. 1180–c. 1278), Cadenet (c. 1160–c. 1235), and Raimon de Miraval (c. 1160–c. 1220) were in the court of Raymond VI of Toulouse (1156–1222), whose excommunication began the Crusade.

Surviving troubadours went either to Portugal, Spain, northern Italy or northern France (where the trouvère tradition lived on), where their skills and techniques contributed to the later developments of secular musical culture in those places. Italian Casella (d. 1300) is mentioned in Dante's Divine Comedy (c. 1321).

The trouvères and troubadours shared similar musical styles, but the trouvères were generally noblemen speaking Old French (also known as langue d'oïl), and their music was able to survive into the thirteenth century unaffected by the Albigensian Crusade, such as Blondel de Nesle, Gautier de Coincy (1177–1236), Theobald I of Navarre (1201–1253), and Adam de la Halle (c. 1250–1307), whose Jeu de Robin et Marion (c. 1283) is a rare sung secular play. Most of the more than two thousand surviving trouvère songs include music, and show a sophistication as great as that of the poetry it accompanies.

=== Minnesänger and Meistersinger ===
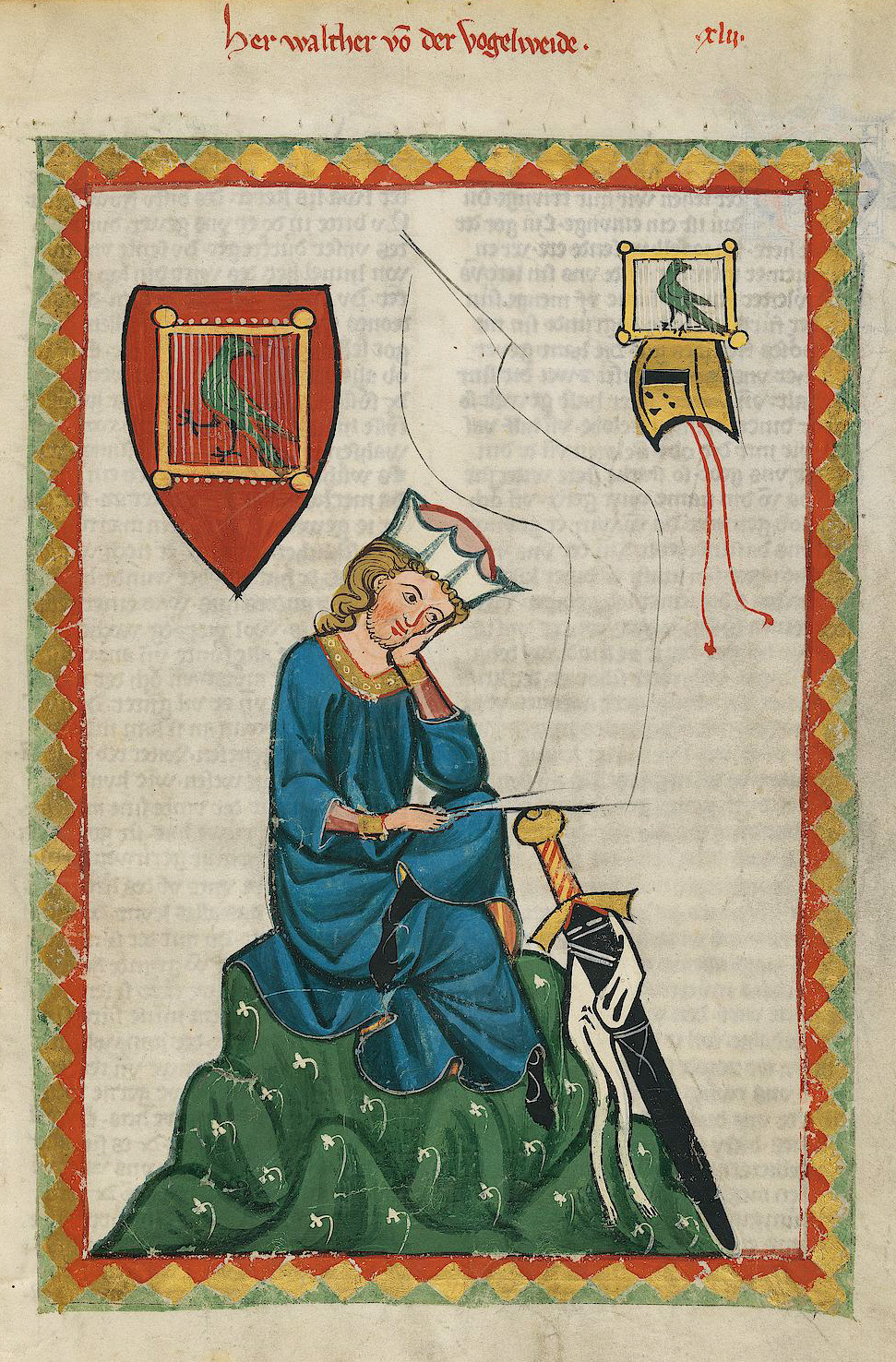
Portrait of Walther von der Vogelweide

The Minnesänger tradition was the German counterpart to the activity of the troubadours and trouvères. Unfortunately, few sources survive from the time; the sources of Minnesang are mostly from two or three centuries after the peak of the movement, leading to some controversy over their accuracy. Among the Minnesängers with surviving music are Wolfram von Eschenbach (died c. 1220), Walther von der Vogelweide (c. 1170–c. 1230), and Niedhart von Reuenthal (c. 1190–c. 1240).

A Meistersinger (German for "master singer") was a member of a German guild for lyric poetry, composition and unaccompanied art song of the 14th, 15th and 16th centuries. The Meistersingers were drawn from middle class males for the most part. Konrad von Würzburg (c. 1225–1287), Reinmar von Zweter (c. 1200–1249), and Heinrich Frauenlob (c. 1255–1318), who allegedly established the earliest Meistersinger school at Mainz, early in the 14th century. The schools originated first in the upper Rhine district, then spread elsewhere.

=== Trovadorismo ===
In the Middle Ages, Galician-Portuguese was the language used in nearly all of Iberia for lyric poetry. From this language derive both modern Galician and Portuguese. The Galician-Portuguese school, which was influenced to some extent (mainly in certain formal aspects) by the Occitan troubadours, is first documented at the end of the twelfth century and lasted until the middle of the fourteenth.

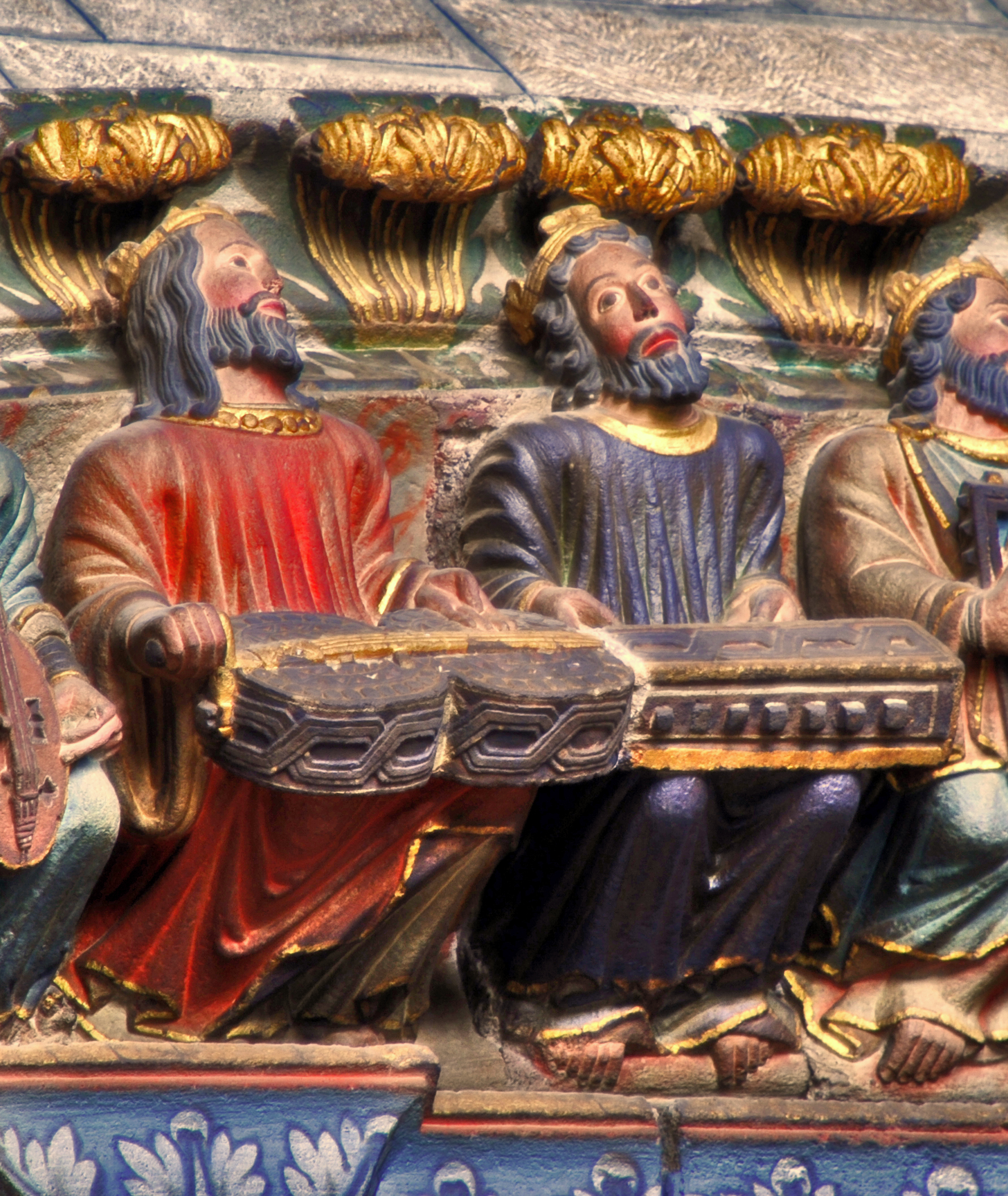
Men playing the organistrum, from the Ourense Cathedral, Spain, 12th century

The earliest extant composition in this school is usually agreed to be Ora faz ost' o senhor de Navarra by the Portuguese João Soares de Paiva, usually dated just before or after 1200. The troubadours of the movement, not to be confused with the Occitan troubadours (who frequented courts in nearby León and Castile), wrote almost entirely cantigas. Beginning probably around the middle of the thirteenth century, these songs, known also as cantares or trovas, began to be compiled in collections known as cancioneiros (songbooks). Three such anthologies are known: the Cancioneiro da Ajuda, the Cancioneiro Colocci-Brancuti (or Cancioneiro da Biblioteca Nacional de Lisboa), and the Cancioneiro da Vaticana. In addition to these there is the priceless collection of over 400 Galician-Portuguese cantigas in the Cantigas de Santa Maria, which tradition attributes to Alfonso X.

The Galician-Portuguese cantigas can be divided into three basic genres: male-voiced love poetry, called cantigas de amor (or cantigas d'amor, in Galician-Portuguese spelling) female-voiced love poetry, called cantigas de amigo (or cantigas d'amigo); and poetry of insult and mockery called cantigas de escárnio e maldizer (or cantigas d'escarnho e de mal dizer). All three are lyric genres in the technical sense that they were strophic songs with either musical accompaniment or introduction on a stringed instrument. But all three genres also have dramatic elements, leading early scholars to characterize them as lyric-dramatic. João Zorro wrote cantigas de amigo about ancient sailors.

The origins of the cantigas d'amor are usually traced to Provençal and Old French lyric poetry, but formally and rhetorically they are quite different. The cantigas d'amigo are probably rooted in a native song tradition, though this view has been contested. The cantigas d'escarnho e maldizer may also (according to Lang) have deep local roots. The latter two genres (totalling around 900 texts) make the Galician-Portuguese lyric unique in the entire panorama of medieval Romance poetry.

The Pergaminho Sharrer contains the songs of King Denis of Portugal (1261–1325).

==== Cantigas de Santa Maria ====
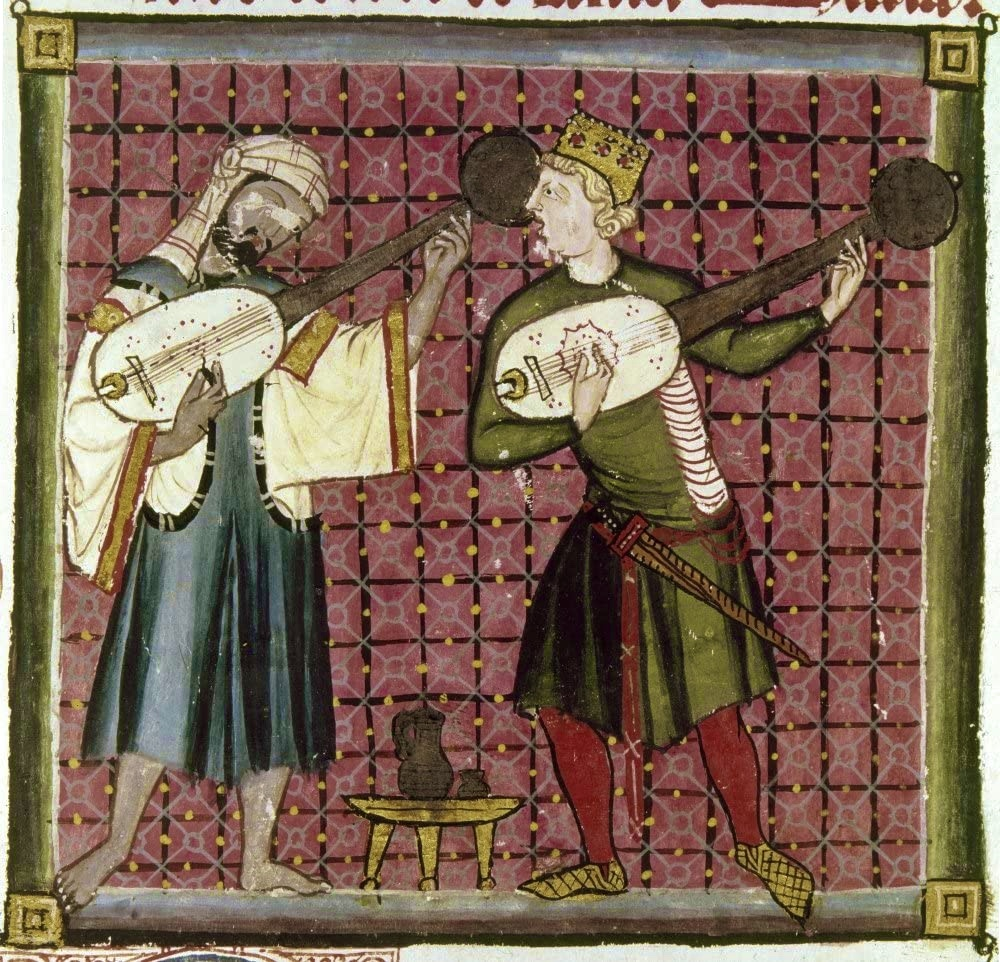
Christian and Muslim playing lutes in a miniature from Cantigas de Santa Maria of Alfonso X

The Cantigas de Santa Maria ("Canticles of St. Mary", c. 1280) are 420 poems with musical notation, written in Galician-Portuguese during the reign of Alfonso X The Wise (1221–1284).

Though the Cantigas are often attributed to Alfonso, it remains unclear as to whether he was a composer himself, or perhaps a compiler; Alfonso is known to regularly invited musicians and poets to court, such as Airas Nunes, whom were undoubtedly involved in the Cantigas production.

It is one of the largest medieval collections of monophonic songs and is characterized by the mention of the Virgin Mary in every song, while every tenth song is a hymn. (Note: The manuscripts have survived in four codices: two at El Escorial, one at Madrid's National Library, and one in Florence.)

The manuscript is also highly decorated, with an illumination every 10 poems, often miniatures depicting musicians, making the manuscript a particularly important source of medieval music iconography.

== Late medieval music (1300–1400) ==
=== Byzantine chant ===
Music of the late Middle Ages include the Byzantine Empire's final period, known as the Palaeologan Renaissance (1261–1453), such as Byzantine chant composer John Koukouzeles (fl. 1300).

=== France: Ars nova ===
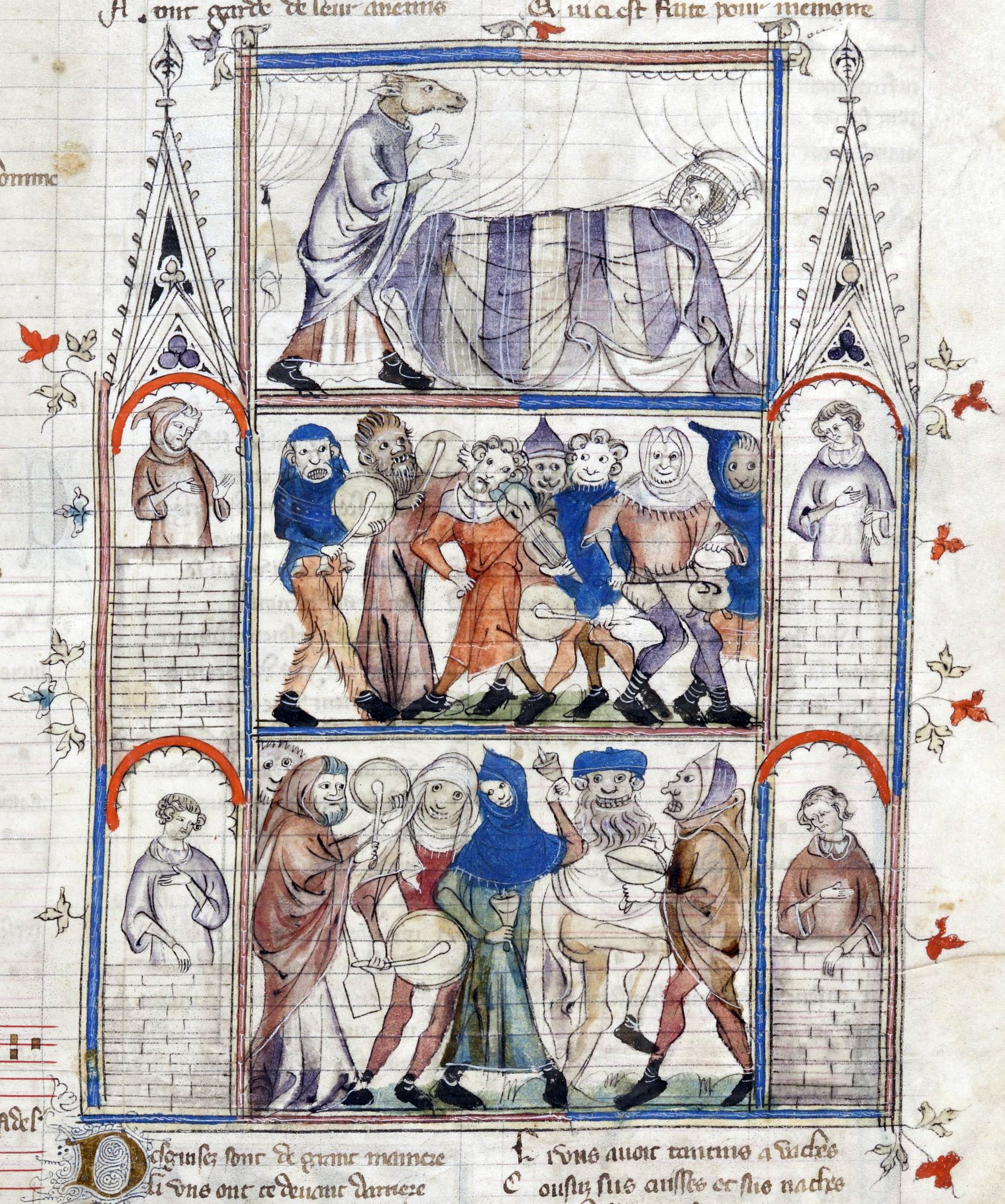
In this illustration from the satirical collection of music and poetry Roman de Fauvel, the horse Fauvel is about to join Vainglory in the bridal bed and the people (dressed as mummers) form a charivari in protest.

The clausula further developed into a form of great elaboration, sophistication and subtlety in the fourteenth century, the period of Ars nova.

The beginning of the Ars nova is one of the few clear chronological divisions in medieval music, since it corresponds to the publication of the Roman de Fauvel, a huge compilation of poetry and music, in 1310 and 1314. The Roman de Fauvel is a satire on abuses in the medieval church, and is filled with medieval motets, lais, rondeaux and other new secular forms.

While most of the music is anonymous, it contains several pieces by Philippe de Vitry (1291–1361), one of the first composers of the isorhythmic motet, a development which distinguishes the fourteenth century. Vitry's treatise Ars Nova ("New Art", c. 1320) gave its name to the style of this era. The formes fixes of ballade, rondeau, and virelai were played by Jehan de Lescurel.

The isorhythmic motet was perfected by Guillaume de Machaut (c. 1300–1377), the finest composer of the time. The musicologist Gilbert Reaney (1924–2008) notes that "before [Machaut], composers either wrote songs or church music. Machaut did both, though it could be said that he neglected the area of liturgical church music."

During the Ars nova era, secular music acquired a polyphonic sophistication formerly found only in sacred music, a development not surprising considering the secular character of the early Renaissance (while this music is typically considered "medieval", the social forces that produced it were responsible for the beginning of the literary and artistic Renaissance in Italy—the distinction between Middle Ages and Renaissance is a blurry one, especially considering arts as different as music and painting). The term "Ars nova" (new art, or new technique) was coined by Philippe de Vitry in his treatise of that name (probably written in 1322), in order to distinguish the practice from the music of the immediately preceding age.

The dominant secular genre of the Ars Nova was the chanson, as it would continue to be in France for another two centuries. These chansons were composed in musical forms corresponding to the poetry they set, which were in the so-called formes fixes of rondeau, ballade, and virelai. These forms significantly affected the development of musical structure in ways that are felt even today; for example, the ouvert-clos rhyme-scheme shared by all three demanded a musical realization which contributed directly to the modern notion of antecedent and consequent phrases.

It was in this period, too, in which began the long tradition of setting the mass ordinary. This tradition started around mid-century with isolated or paired settings of Kyries, Glorias, etc., but Machaut composed what is thought to be the first complete mass conceived as one composition. The sound world of Ars Nova music is very much one of linear primacy and rhythmic complexity. "Resting" intervals are the fifth and octave, with thirds and sixths considered dissonances. Leaps of more than a sixth in individual voices are not uncommon, leading to speculation of instrumental participation at least in secular performance. Surviving French manuscripts include the Ivrea Codex and the Apt Codex.

==== Ars nova and rhythm ====
The next advance in rhythm came from German theorist Franco of Cologne. In his treatise Ars cantus mensurabilis ("The Art of Mensurable Music", c. 1280), he describes a system of notation in which differently shaped notes have entirely different rhythmic values. Whereas before the length of the individual note could only be gathered from the mode itself, this new inverted relationship made the mode dependent upon—and determined by—the individual notes or figurae that have incontrovertible durational values.

In Franco's system, the relationship between a breve and a semibreves (that is, half breves) was equivalent to that between a breve and a long: and, since for him modus was always perfect (grouped in threes), the tempus or beat was also inherently perfect and therefore contained three semibreves. Sometimes the context of the mode would require a group of only two semibreves, however, these two semibreves would always be one of normal length and one of double length, thereby taking the same space of time, and thus preserving the perfect subdivision of the tempus. This ternary division held for all note values.

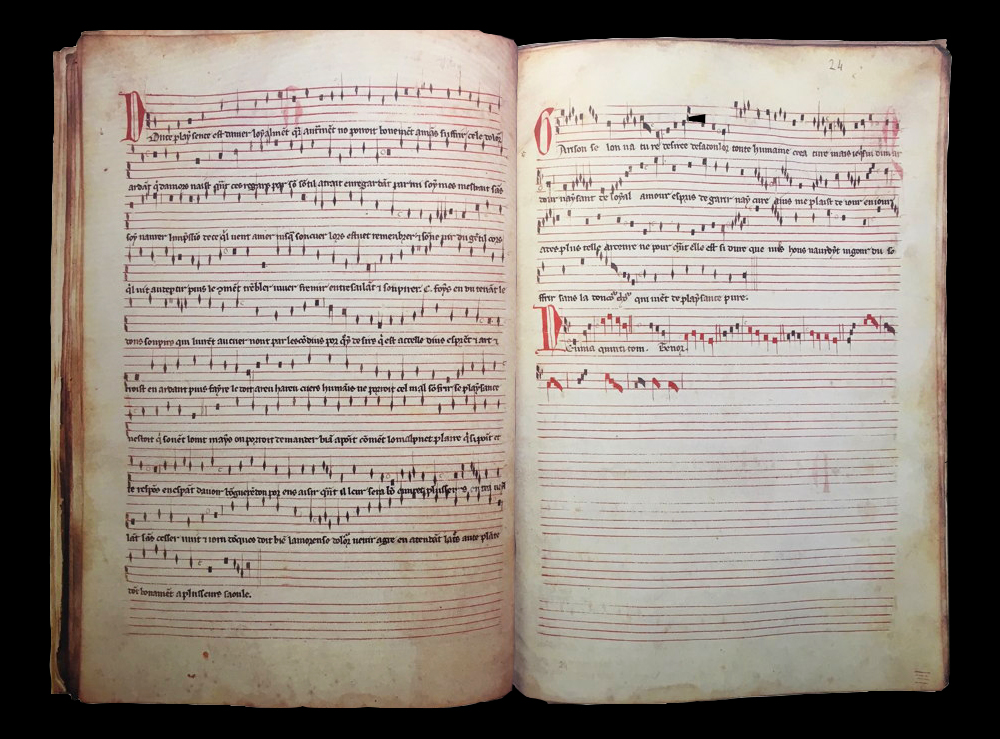
Excerpt from the 14th-century Ivrea Codex containing the tenor voice of Philippe de Vitry's Douce playsence est d’amer loyalment/Garison selon nature desire de sa doulor.

Vitry, who built upon Franco's work, introduced two important changes: the first was an even smaller subdivision of notes (semibreves, could now be divided into minim), and the second was the development of "mensuration." In some ways the modern system of rhythmic notation began with Vitry, who completely broke free from the older idea of the rhythmic modes. The notational predecessors of modern time meters also originate with Vitry.

Mensurations could be combined in various manners to produce metrical groupings. These groupings of mensurations are the precursors of simple and compound meter. By the time of Vitry, the perfect division of the tempus was not the only option as duple divisions became more accepted. For Vitry the breve could be divided, for an entire composition, or section of one, into groups of two or three smaller semibreves. This way, the tempus (the term that came to denote the division of the breve) could be either "perfect" (tempus perfectum), with ternary subdivision, or "imperfect" (tempus imperfectum), with binary subdivision.

In a similar fashion, the semibreve's division (termed prolation) could be divided into three minima (prolatio perfectus or major prolation) or two minima (prolatio imperfectus or minor prolation) and, at the higher level, the longs division (called modus) could be three or two breves (modus perfectus or perfect mode, or modus imperfectus or imperfect mode respectively). Vitry took this a step further by indicating the proper division of a given piece at the beginning through the use of a "mensuration sign", equivalent to our modern "time signature".

Tempus perfectum was indicated by a circle, while tempus imperfectum was denoted by a half-circle (the current symbol, used as an alternative for the 4/4 time signature, is actually a holdover of this symbol, not a letter C as an abbreviation for "common time", as popularly believed). While many of these innovations are ascribed to Vitry, it was a contemporary and acquaintance of his Johannes de Muris (or Jehan des Mars) who offered the most comprehensive and systematic treatment of the new mensural innovations of Vitry. (Note: Many scholars, citing a lack of positive attributory evidence, now consider "Vitry's" treatise to be anonymous, but this does not diminish its importance for the history of rhythmic notation. However, this makes the first definitely identifiable scholar to accept and explain the mensural system to be de Muris, who can be said to have done for it what Garlandia did for the rhythmic modes.)

For the duration of the medieval period, most music would be composed primarily in perfect tempus, with special effects created by sections of imperfect tempus; there is a great current controversy among musicologists as to whether such sections were performed with a breve of equal length or whether it changed, and if so, at what proportion.

=== Italy: Trecento ===
Squarcialupi Codex showing Francesco Landini

Most of the music of Ars nova was French in origin; however, the term is often loosely applied to all 14th-century music, especially to include the secular music in Italy, where this period is known as the Trecento. Its music was influenced by Marchetto da Padova (fl. 1305–1319), who refined notation, modes, and tuning; and was the first music theorist to discuss chromaticism. Maestro Piero (c. 1299–c. 1349) was on the era's earliest composers, employed by the Visconti and della Scala families.

Italian music has always been known for its lyrical or melodic character, and this goes back to the 14th century in many respects. Italian secular music of this time (what little surviving liturgical music there is, is similar to the French except for somewhat different notation) featured what has been called the cantalina style, with a florid top voice supported by two (or even one; a fair amount of Italian Trecento music is for only two voices) that are more regular and slower moving. This type of texture remained a feature of Italian music in the popular 15th and 16th century secular genres as well, and was an important influence on the eventual development of the trio texture that revolutionized music in the 17th.

There were three main forms for secular works in the Trecento. One was the madrigal, not the same as that of 150–250 years later, but with a verse/refrain-like form. Three-line stanzas, each with different words, alternated with a two-line ritornello, with the same text at each appearance. Perhaps we can see the seeds of the subsequent late-Renaissance and Baroque ritornello in this device; it too returns again and again, recognizable each time, in contrast with its surrounding disparate sections.

The madrigal form also gave rise to polyphonic canons (songs in which multiple singers sing the same melody, but starting at different times), especially in Italy where they were called caccie ("chase"). These were three-part secular pieces, which featured the two higher voices in canon, with an underlying instrumental long-note accompaniment. Sometimes, this form also featured a ritornello, which was occasionally also in a canonic style. Usually, the name of this genre provided a double meaning, since the texts of caccia were primarily about hunts and related outdoor activities, or at least action-filled scenes; second meaning was that a voice caccia (follows, run after) the preceding one. The third main form was the ballata, which was roughly equivalent to the French virelai.

Surviving Italian manuscripts include the Squarcialupi Codex and the Rossi Codex, with composers such as advocate of "sweet, gentle melody" Jacopo da Bologna (fl. 1340–1386), Andrea da Firenze, Gherardello da Firenze (c. 1325–1362), Giovanni da Firenze, Paolo da Firenze, Lorenzo da Firenze, who taught the blind Francesco Landini (c. 1325–1397). (Note: An effect of contracting smallpox in childhood.) According to Nino Pirrotta (1908–1998), Donato da Cascia (fl. c. 1350–1370) "represents the peak of virtuoso singing in the Italian madrigal, and therefore in the Italian Ars nova as a whole."

Additional composers include Bartolino da Padova, Lorenzo Masini, Niccolò da Perugia, and Florence Cathedral organist Giovanni Mazzuoli (c. 1360–1426), whose music led into the Quattrocentro, including Antonio da Cividale (c. 1392–1421), Zacara da Teramo, Antonius Romanus, and Bartolomeo da Bologna.

In the late Middle Ages, some purely instrumental music also began to be notated, though this remained rare. Dance music makes up most of the surviving instrumental music, and includes types such as the ballata, estampie, ductia, and nota.

=== Flagellants ===
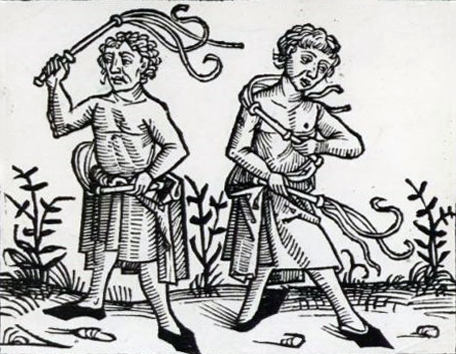
Flagellants, from a fifteenth-century woodcut

==== Disciplinati ====
Flagellants sought to cleanse their sins and appease the wrath of an angry God by penitential music such as laudas accompanied by mortification of their bodies. (Note: The film Monty Python and the Holy Grail (1975) parodies flagellants with a group of monks chanting the Pie Jesu, while hitting themselves in the face with a board.) This practice started with Raniero Fasani and the disciplinati of Italy in 1260.

==== Geisslerlieder ====
The Geisslerlieder were the songs of wandering bands of German flagellants. There were two separate periods of activity of Geisslerlied: one around the middle of the thirteenth century, from which no music survives (although numerous lyrics do); and another from 1349, for which both words and music survive intact due to the attention of a single priest who wrote about the movement and recorded its music. This second period corresponds to the spread of the Black Death in Europe.

=== Ars subtilior ===
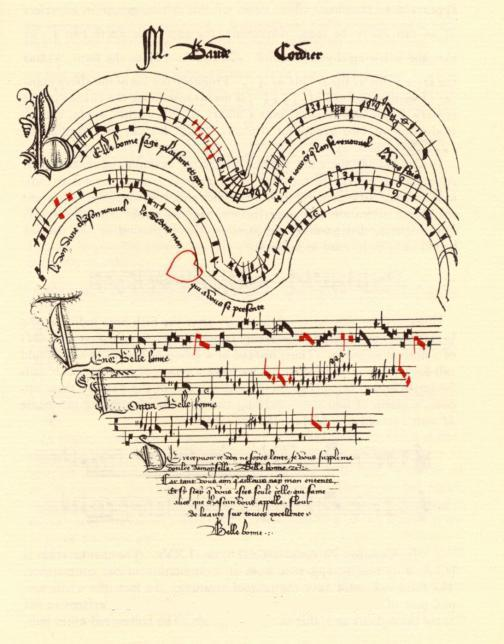
The chanson Belle, bonne, sage by Baude Cordier, an Ars subtilior piece included in the Chantilly Codex

The end of the medieval era is marked by a highly manneristic and syncopated style known as Ars subtilior, contrasted with the Ars Nova style. In some ways, this was an attempt to meld the French and Italian styles. This music was highly stylized, demonstrating a rhythmic complexity, with different voices written in different mensurations simultaneously, that was not matched until the 20th century.

Not only was its rhythm complex, even including examples of augenmusik (such as a chanson by Baude Cordier written out in manuscript in the shape of a heart), but also its melodic material was quite complex as well, particularly in its interaction with the rhythmic structures.

Isorhythm continued to develop through late-century and in fact did not achieve its highest degree of sophistication until early in the 15th century. Instead of using isorhythmic techniques in one or two voices, or trading them among voices, some works came to feature a pervading isorhythmic texture which rivals the integral serialism of the 20th century in its systematic ordering of rhythmic and tonal elements. The term "mannerism" was applied by later scholars, as it often is, in response to an impression of sophistication being practised for its own sake, a malady which some authors have felt infected the Ars subtilior.

Jacob Senleches (fl. 1382–1395) was a harpist for Pedro de Luna, Cardinal of Aragon (later Antipope Benedict XIII, 1394–1423).

One of the most important extant sources of Ars Subtilior chansons is the Chantilly Codex, with composers such as Cordier, Solage, Gacian Reyneau (fl. 1398–1429), and Borlet. Chantilly Codex composers seen to be transitional from Ars nova to Ars subtilior include Grimace, P. des Molins, Jehan Vaillant, and François Andrieu, who wrote a double ballade déploration for the death of Machaut.

Johannes Ciconia (1370–1412) composed several motets, and was chaplain at Padua Cathedral. Musicologist Heinrich Besseler (1900–1969) referred to this period in music as “the era of Ciconia". Ciconia was influenced by Anthonello de Caserta and Philippus de Caserta. Antipope Alexander V was a patron of Matteo da Perugia (fl. 1400–1416).

=== Transitioning to the Renaissance ===
Demarcating the end of the medieval era and the beginning of the Renaissance era, with regard to the composition of music, is difficult. While the music of the fourteenth century is fairly obviously medieval in conception, the music of the early fifteenth century is often conceived as belonging to a transitional period, not only retaining some of the ideals of the end of the Middle Ages (such as a type of polyphonic writing in which the parts differ widely from each other in character, as each has its specific textural function), but also showing some of the characteristic traits of the Renaissance (such as the increasingly international style developing through the diffusion of Franco-Flemish musicians throughout Europe, and in terms of texture an increasing equality of parts).

Music historians do not agree on when the Renaissance era began, but most historians agree that England was still a medieval society in the early fifteenth century (see periodization issues of the Middle Ages). While there is no consensus, 1400 is a useful marker, because it was around that time that the Renaissance came into full swing in Italy.

The increasing reliance on the interval of the third as a consonance is one of the most pronounced features of transition into the Renaissance. Polyphony, in use since the 12th century, became increasingly elaborate with highly independent voices throughout the 14th century.

English composers such as Leonel Power (c. 1380–1445), John Dunstaple (c. 1390–1453), and Roy Henry (fl. c. 1400), used Contenance Angloise ("English countenance"), which partly came about through the local technique of faburden (an improvisatory process in which a chant melody and a written part predominantly in parallel sixths above it are ornamented by one sung in perfect fourths below the latter, and which later took hold on the continent as "fauxbordon"), which had the interval of the third emerge as an important musical development.

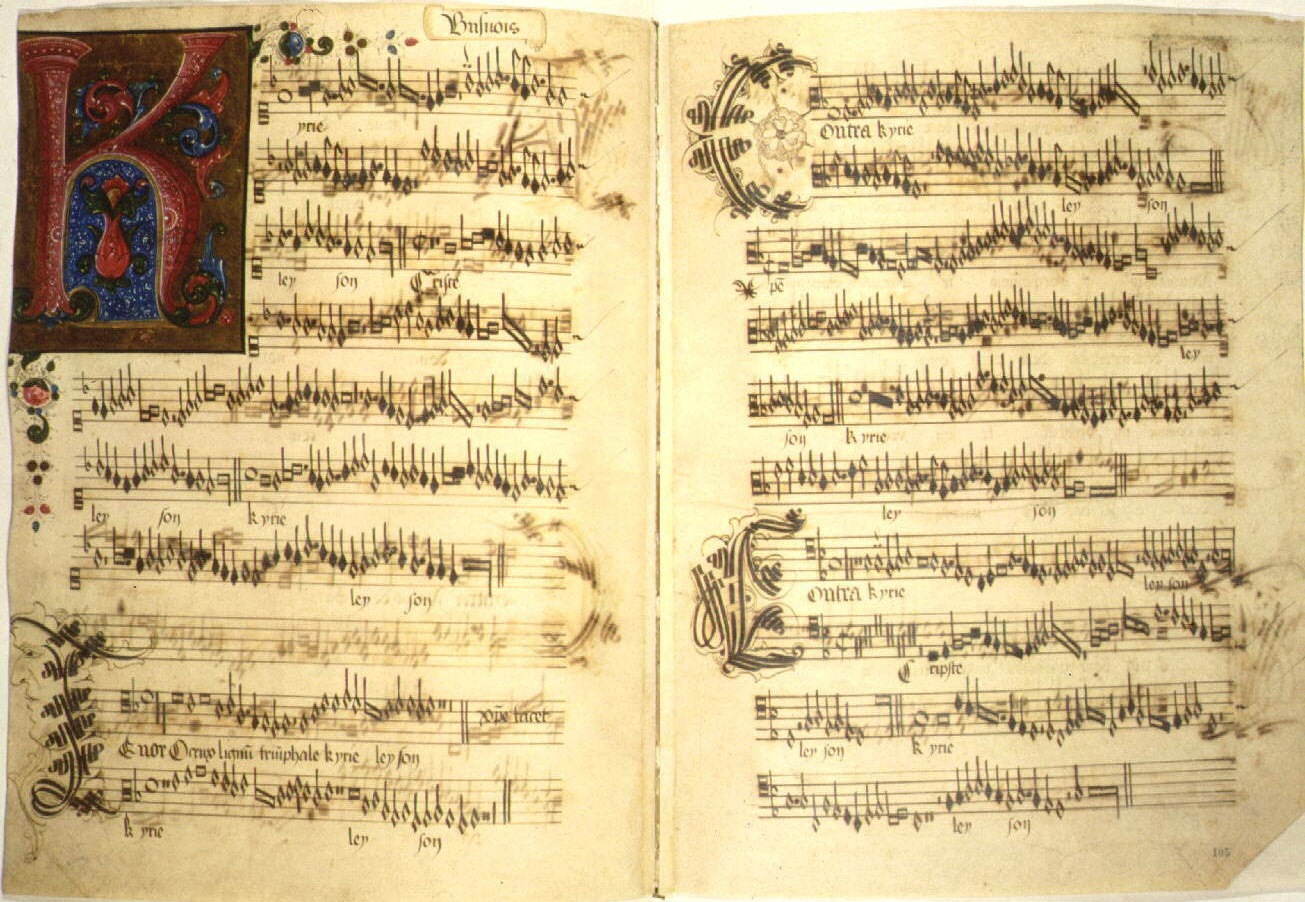
Manuscript of the Mass Missa O Crux Lignum by Antoine Busnois (c. 1450)

Tyrolean Oswald von Wolkenstein (1377–1445) was both a composer and a diplomat who traveled extensively. English stylistic tendencies began to influence continental composers as early as the 1420s, such as the young Guillaume Du Fay (1397–1474) and Arnold de Lantins. While the Hundred Years' War (1337–1453) continued, English nobles, armies, their chapels and retinues, and therefore some of their composers, travelled in France and performed their music there. English manuscripts include the Worcester Fragments, the Old St. Andrews Music Book, the Old Hall Manuscript, and Egerton Manuscript.

An early composer from the Franco-Flemish School of the Renaissance was Johannes Ockeghem (1410/1425 –1497), renowned for expressive music and technical prowess. Ockeghem was the chaplain of King Charles VII (1403–1461) and probably studied with Gilles Binchois (c. 1400–1460), and at least was closely associated with him at the Burgundian court. Antoine Busnois (c. 1430–1492) wrote a motet in honor of Ockeghem, who is a direct link from the Burgundian style to the next generation of Netherlanders, such as Jacob Obrecht (1458–1505) and Josquin des Prez (c. 1450–1521).

== See also ==
- Dark Ages (historiography)
- List of medieval composers
- List of medieval music theorists

== Sources ==
- Apel, Willi (1961). The Notation of Polyphonic Music 900–1600. fifth edition, revised and with commentary. Cambridge MA: The Medieval Academy of America.
- Brown, Howard Mayer; Stein, Louise K. (1998). Music in the Renaissance (2nd ed.). London: Pearson plc. ISBN 978-0-13-400045-9.
- Caldwell, John (2019) [1978]. Medieval Music. Oxford: Taylor & Francis. ISBN 978-0-429-57526-6.
- Chandler, Richard E.; Schwartz, Kessel (1991). A New History of Spanish Literature (1st ed.). Baton Rouge: Louisiana State University Press. ISBN 978-0-8071-1735-4.
- Christensen, Thomas, ed. (2002). The Cambridge History of Western Music Theory. Cambridge: Cambridge University Press. ISBN 978-1-139-05347-1.
- Fassler, Margot (2014). Frisch, Walter (ed.). Music in the Medieval West. Western Music in Context: A Norton History (1st ed.). New York: W. W. Norton & Company. ISBN 978-0-393-92915-7.
- Gibbs, Marion E.; Johnson, Sidney M., eds. (1997). Medieval German Literature: A Companion. London: Routledge. ISBN 978-0-415-92896-0.
- Hindley, Goffrey, ed. (1971). The Larousse Encyclopedia of Music. London: Hamlyn. ISBN 978-0-600-02396-8.
- Hoppin, Richard (1978). Medieval Music. The Norton Introduction to Music History (1st ed.). New York: W. W. Norton & Company. ISBN 978-0-393-09090-1.
- Kartomi, Margaret J. (1990). On Concepts and Classifications of Musical Instruments. Chicago: University of Chicago Press. ISBN 978-0-226-42549-8.
- McKinnon, James, ed. (1990). Antiquity and the Middle Ages: From Ancient Greece to the 15th Century. London: Palgrave Macmillan. ISBN 978-1-349-21157-9.
- Michaëlis de Vasconcellos, Carolina (1904). Cancioneiro da Ajuda (in Portuguese) (edição critica e commentada ed.). Halle a.S.: M. Niemeyer. OCLC 906105804.
- Parrish, Carl (1957). The Notation of Medieval Music. London: Faber and Faber. OCLC 906105804.
- Seay, Albert (1965). Music in the Medieval World. Englewood Cliffs: Prentice Hall. OCLC 468886489.
- Ultan, Lloyd (1977). Music Theory: Problems and Practices in the Middle Ages and Renaissance. Minneapolis: University of Minnesota Press. ISBN 978-1-4529-1208-0.
- Wolinski, Mary; Borders, James (26 February 2020). "Medieval Music". Oxford Bibliographies: Music. Oxford: Oxford University Press. doi:10.1093/OBO/9780199757824-0269. ISBN 978-0-19-975782-4.
- Yudkin, Jeremy (1989). Music in Medieval Europe (1st ed.). Upper Saddle River: Prentice Hall. ISBN 978-0-13-608192-0.
