= Amerus =

Italian-based English music theorist

Amerus (also Aluredus, Annuerus, Aumerus) was a 13th-century English music theorist who lived in Italy.

Amerus worked under Cardinal Ottobono Fieschi, who later became Pope Adrian V, and wrote his only known work, Practica artis musicae, while in Fieschi's employ. It is thought that he wrote the text in 1271 at Viterbo, where the papal conclave was held.

Practica artis musicae is an instruction treatise for boys, which explains contemporaneous musical notation systems. The bulk of the work is an explanation of the tonary system as it was used in French, English, and Italian churches. The treatise also discusses the composition of polyphony, which is believed to be the first surviving treatise from Italy to use rhythmic notation. Amerus discusses the longa, brevis, and semibrevis, assigning them in groups of two (rather than three). The work is preserved in the Bamberg Codex, among other places.
