= Torcafol =

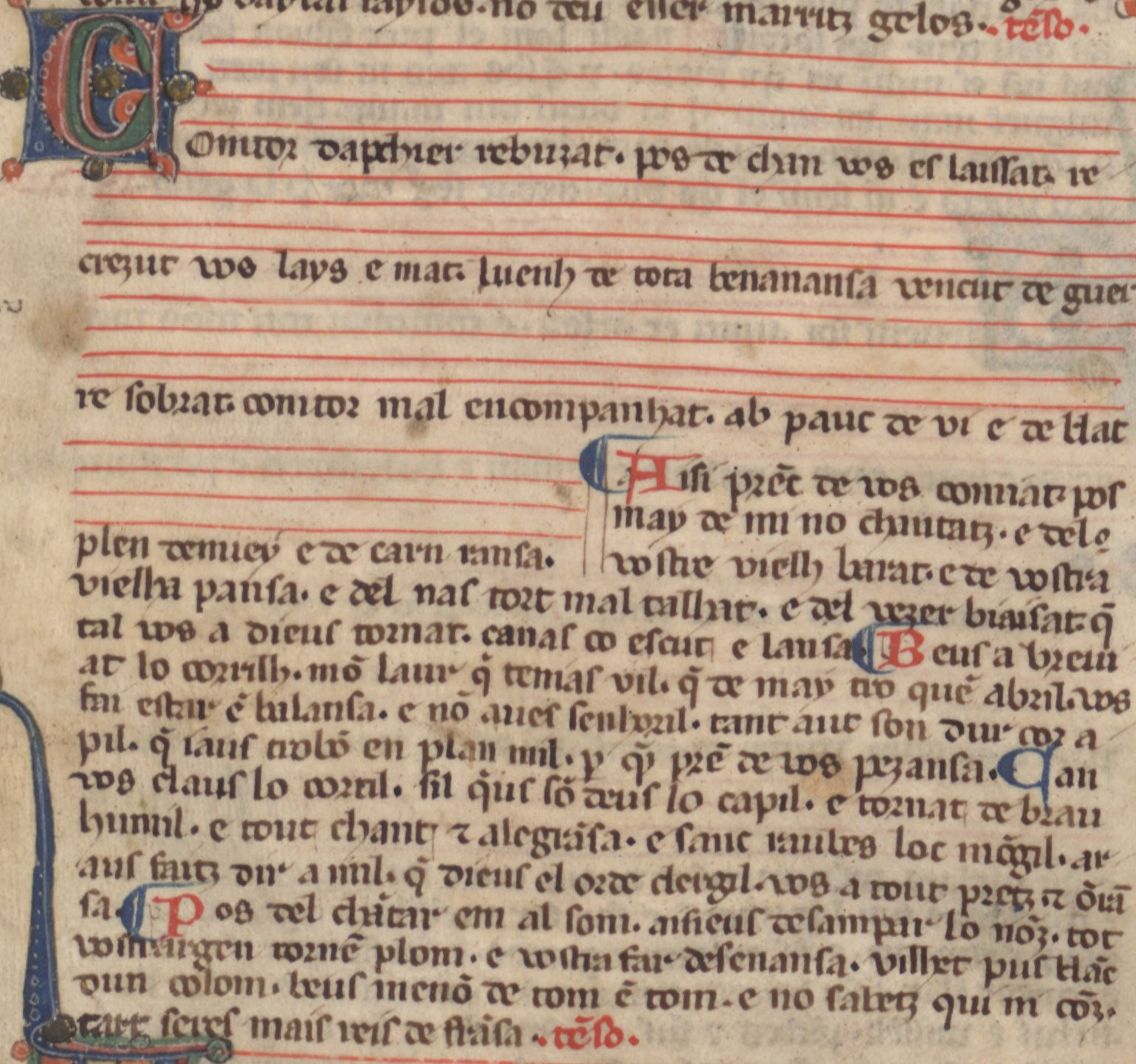
« Comtor d'Apchier rebuzat » : a tenso from Torcafol to Garin d'Apchier (BNF ms. fr. 22543, 14th century

Torcafol or Torcafols (fl. 1175–1200) is the nickname of an occitanian troubadour from Gévaudan.

He is known for his sirventes with his rival Garin d'Apchier.

== Sources ==
- (in French) Appel, Carl (1898). "Garin d'Apchier et Torcafol". Poésies provençales inédites tirées des manuscrits d'Italie (in French). H. Welter. pp. 36–56.
- (in French) Trémolet de Villers, Anne (1993). Trobar en Gévaudan (in French). pp. 31–36.
- (in French) Dalle, J. A. (1972). Choses et gens de Gévaudan. La grande et la petite histoire des communes françaises (in French). Vol. 4. Éditions Roudil.
- (in Italian) Latella, Fortunata (1991). I Sirventesi di Garin d'Apchier e di Torcafol (in Italian). Modène: Mucchi. ISBN 9788870002379.
