= Borlet =

Borlet was a 14th- and 15th-century composer. Little is known about his life. It is thought that his name is an anagram of Trebol, a French composer who served Martin of Aragon in 1409 at the same time as Gacian Reyneau and other composers in the Codex Chantilly.

If this Trebol is the same as Trebor then he has seven surviving compositions. If not then he is only known for his virelai 'He tres doulz roussignol' and its variation 'Ma tre dol rosignol', which is also a virelai.

== See also ==
- Trebor
