= W. de Wycombe =

English composer (fl. late 13th century)

W. de Wycombe (fl. late 13th century; also Wicumbe, Whichbury and Winchecumbe) was an English composer of the high medieval music. He was precentor of the priory of Leominster in Herefordshire. It is possible that he was the composer of one of the most famous tunes from medieval England, "Sumer is icumen in".

== Life and career ==
Wycombe is variously identified as W de Wyc, Willelmus de Winchecumbe, Willelmo de Winchecumbe, or William of Winchcombe. (Note: Sanders (in Grove) considers the identification of the composer with Willelmus de Winchecumbe improbable.) He appears to have been a secular scribe and precentor employed for about four years at the priory of Leominster in Herefordshire during the 1270s. He is also thought to have been a sub-deacon of the cathedral priory as listed in the Worcester Annals or possibly a monk at St Andrew's in Worcester.

Wycombe left a number of documents with his signature, including a collectarium, a precentor's workbook, two rotuli (scrolls) containing music, a summary and treatise on music, a history to which Winchecumbe added music and other books. His name also appears in a Reading manuscript including the rota "Sumer is icumen in", and on one of seven sets of four-part compositions in the Wintonia collection. Two of these compositions are partially preserved and parts of others are to be found in the Worcester Fragments. Of these compositions, only Alleluia, Dies sanctificatus is completely restorable. The works have a four-part polyphonic structure. One more fragment is found copied in the Montpellier Codex.

Wycombe's main period of activity was probably the 1270s and 1280s. He is best known as the composer of polyphonic alleluias. Over 40 settings have been identified in several sources, a group of compositions almost equal in size to that of Léonin, the earlier composer of the continental Notre Dame school, but only one of the 40 can be restored completely; the others exist only in fragments. Some of his work appears in the Worcester Fragments, a collection of 59 manuscript leaves representing about a third of the total surviving polyphony from 13th-century England.

Each of Wycombe's alleluias is in four sections. The second and fourth contain the solo response and verse sections, while the first and third contain free polyphony. Stylistically they are similar to the Reading Rota itself ("Sumer is icumen in"), emphasizing tonic and supertonic, and showing the English preference for the harmonic interval of the third.
