= Worcester Fragments =

- Bodleian Library, Oxford
- Date: ~1250–1350
- Place of origin: Worcester Cathedral Priory
- Language: Middle English
- Material: Music Notation

The Worcester Fragments are a collection of medieval music associated with Worcester, England.

They are referred to as "fragments" because they no longer exist in one unified manuscript but have been reassembled from sheets used as book-binding material in later centuries.

== History ==
The Worcester Fragments were originally created in the late 13th century or early 14th century. The original manuscript was probably broken up in the 1520s, bundled together into several collections of flyleaves that became saved in various books which had historical connections with Worcester. Some collections of fragments have been dated to C.1527–1531.

Parts of what would be later identified as Worcester Fragments were first discovered in 1836. In 1906, The Worcester Cathedral Library was being catalogued, and it was then recognized that these scattered fragments came from the same source. Therefore, it was possible to piece them together. Reconstruction efforts began in 1924. By 1952, all known pieces has been both cataloged and transcribed.

The fragments are currently divided among three locations. The Worcester Cathedral Library holds the majority, and the British Library has fragments of four additional leaves. Fifteen other fragments recovered from late-medieval bindings at Worcester Cathedral Priory are housed at the Bodleian Library at Oxford. They are listed as 'Bodleian Library MS. Lat. liturg. d. 20'.

== Composition ==
There are about 60 known fragments. Together, they comprise 25 short pieces of vocal music. It is the largest known collection of polyphonic music from the 13th century.

None of the fragments, when played, is longer than five minutes, with some as short as one minute long. They demonstrate a variety of musical forms from the period, including the conductus and motet. Parts of several polyphonic compositions attributed to Willelmus de Winchecumbe are included in the Worcester Fragments.

One of the most famous pieces contained within the fragments is a poem titled 'The Departing Soul's Address to the Body', which contains 680 known stanzas. It was first published in 1844.
