= Bamberg Codex =

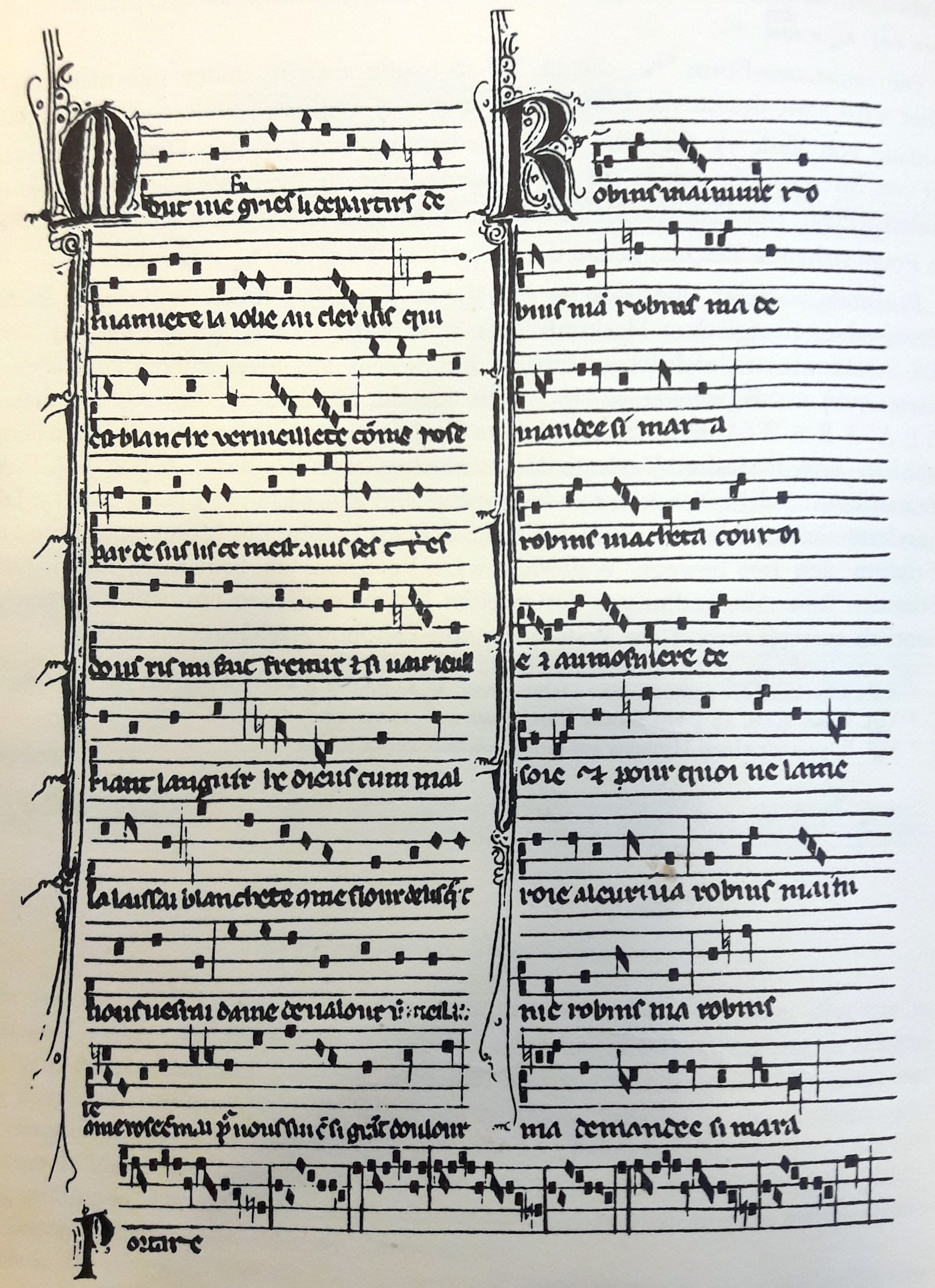

The Bamberg Codex (Bamberg State Library, Msc.Lit.115) is a manuscript containing two treatises on music theory and a large body of 13th-century French polyphony.

The first part of the Bamberg Codex contains 100 double motets, which are three-voice pieces with two contrapuntal lines above a cantus firmus. Forty-four of the motets have Latin texts, 47 have French texts, and 9 are macaronic. This is followed by a conductus and 7 settings of hockets. The musical notation is similar to that used in the Montpellier Codex, although some advances in notational clarity are evident, for instance in multi-column layouts, each voice observes line breaks at the same place in the piece. These motets were likely composed between 1260 and 1290, and are generally in the style associated with Franco of Cologne.

The second part of the Codex contains two theoretical treatises, one by Amerus and one anonymous, as well as two motets added later.

The Codex is likely Parisian in provenance.

== Description/Contents ==
The Bamberg Codex is bound in ivory pigskin with embroidered gold lettering. It is written on parchment and consists of eighty pages classified into ten groups and Arabic numerals appear in pencil in the top right-hand corner of each page. The codex is mostly associated with Franconian notation, although it does include motets. This points to how popular secular music was becoming towards the end of the 13th century and also how music was becoming more accessible to the common folk, many of whom never learned to speak Latin other than reciting it in church services. This is consistent with the Montpellier Codex containing many secular songs in its collection as well, showing the extent of this phenomenon, not constraining it to just one musical school in the period. Different aspects of the manuscript such as the trimming and coloring of the pages, the format of the text, and the amount of wear and tear points to the notion that the codex was compiled in a manner that allowed people to perform the songs without any prior rehearsal.

Most of these motets are three-voice motets, meaning they have three different voices in the written music. There are more than 100 of these motets contained in the codex. Forty-four of these have Latin texts, forty-seven have French texts, and nine have macaronic texts. Macaronic texts are written in a hybrid between two languages, in this case Latin and the vernacular French. There is only one motet in the Codex with four voice parts, the rest have three parts. All of the motets in the Codex of Bamberg are polyphonic and polytextual. The codex also contains two treatises, one by an anonymous writer, and the other by Amerus. This treatise, Practica artis musice, was intended to explain notation systems while also discussing polyphony. Amerus’ work is believed to be among the first treatises from Italy using rhythmic notation. The techniques used for most of the composition of the motets and songs included basic practices used in the era of medieval motets during the 13th century. This included the use of rhythmic modes and an early developed form of the staff. This provided a basis for exact pitch along with a form of our modern staff.

After the main section of the previously mentioned motets, a conductus and 7 hockets follow. A conductus is a type of sacred, but non-liturgical vocal composition for one or more voices. A hocket is a rhythmic linear technique that utilizes the differentiation of certain rhythmic and scale elements. In the medieval practice of a hocket, a single melody is usually shared between two voices so one voice sounds while the other rests and this act alternates between the voices.

List of pieces from the Codex

1. Je ne chant pas / Talens m'est pris de chanter / Aptatur / Omnes (4 voices)
2. Ave, Virgo regia / Ave, plena gracie / Fiat (2 voices, fiddle, harp)
3. In seculum breve (2 fiddles, dulcimer, harp)
4. Entre Adan et Henequel / Chief bien seans /Aptatur (3 voices)
5. Ave, plena gracie / Salve, Virgo regia / Aptatur (2 voices, recorder, fiddle, harp, lute)
6. Neuma (recorder, horn, fiddle, harp)
7. Ave, in styrpe spinosa / Ave, gloriosa / Manere (3 voices)
8. El mois de mai / De se debent / Kyrie (3 voices)
9. In seculum viellatoris (3 fiddles)
10. Mout me fu griès / In omni frate tuo / In seculum (3 voices)
11. Entre Copin / Je me cuidoie / Bele Ysabelot (3 voices)
12. Virgo (2 fiddles, dulcimer, harp)
13. Pouvre secours / Gaude chorus / Angelus (3 voices)
14. Chorus Innocencium / In Bethleem / In Bethleem (2 voices, fiddle, percussion)
15. In seculum d'Amiens breve (recorder, 2 fiddles, lute)
16. O Maria, Virgo davitica / O Maria, maris stella / Misit Dominus (2 voices, recorder, 2 fiddles)
17. Miranda / Salve, mater / Kyrie (7 voices)
18. In seculum longum (recorder, 2 fiddles)
19. Agmina milicie / Agmina milicie / Agmina (3 voices)
20. Quant flourist / Non orphanum / Et gaudebit (4 voices)
21. In seculum d'Amiens longum (recorder, fiddle, harp)
22. me tu griès II / Robins m'aime / Portare (3 voices)
23. Or voi je bien / Eximium / Virgo (2 voices, fiddle, harp)
24. Ave, Virgo regia / Ave, gloriosa / Domino (3 voices)
25. Mors que stimulo / Mors morsu / Mors (6 voices)

== Significance ==
The Bamberg Codex is an important collection of thirteenth-century motets; it provides source material of significant historical and musicological significance. As such, it offers a compact and concise database for the music of the time. Not only does this show the advancement of music both in complexity and the notation but also the spread of secular music through the writings of Amerus. The Bamberg Codex and its perception about the origin and provenance of the manuscript continues to be contested, with some pointing to more French motets than Latin motets in the codex, as proof that the codex belongs to French repertory.

== Citation ==
- Bamberg, Codex, 2003.
- Norwood, Patricia P. “Evidence Concerning the Provenance of the Bamberg Codex.” The Journal of Musicology, vol. 8, no. 4, 1990, pp. 491–504. JSTOR, www.jstor.org/stable/763532.
