= La dousa votz =

La dousa votz ai auzida is a song by troubadour Bernart de Ventadorn. It is sung in Provençal and played in the mixolydian mode. It is a song about unrequited love from a dastardly woman, and “The sweet voice I have heard" of a nightingale soothing lovesickness.
