= Garin d'Apchier =

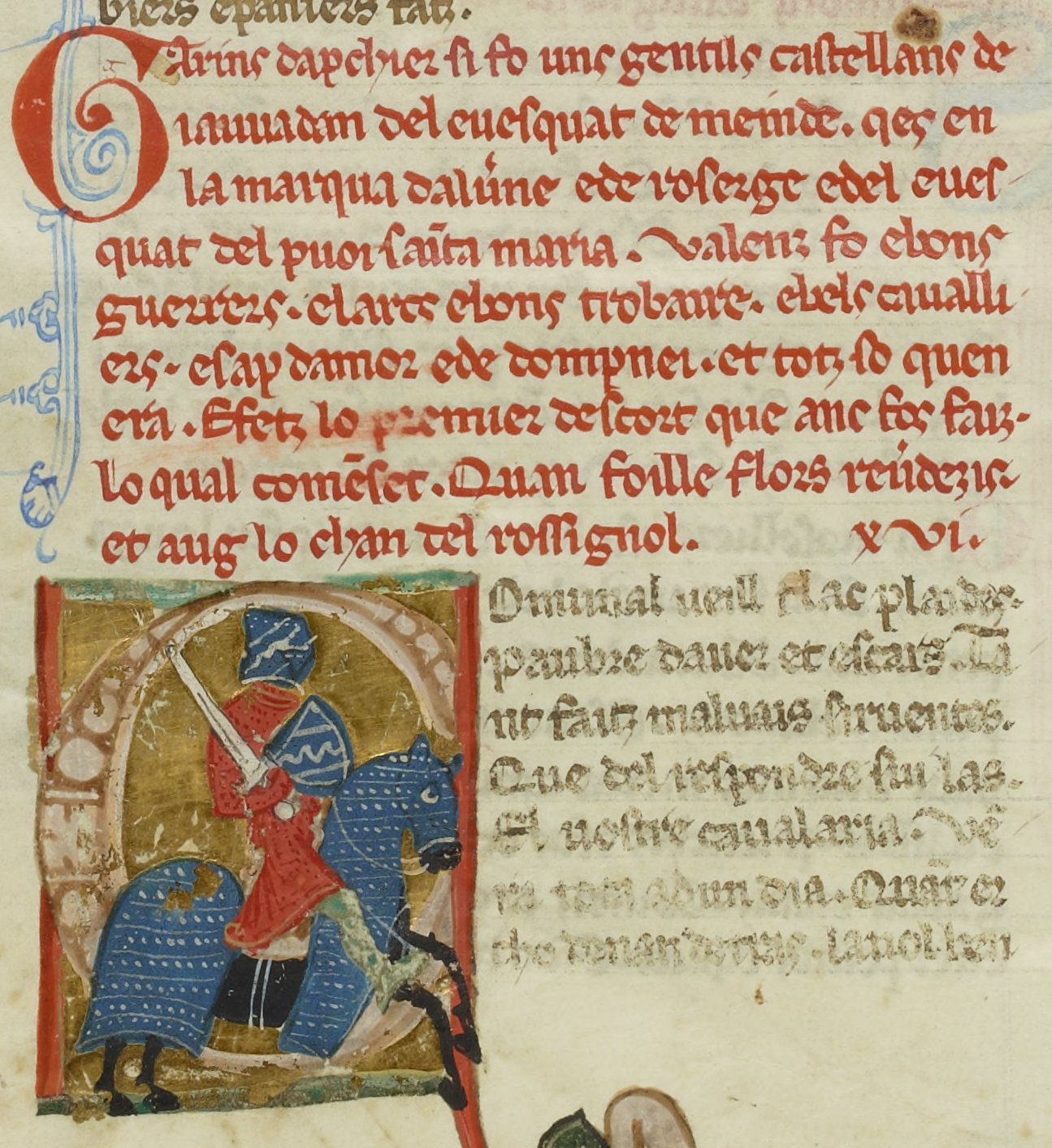
Garins d'Apchier si fo uns gentils castellans de Javuadan del evesquat de Memde, q'es en la marqua d'Alverne e de Roserge e del evesquat del Puoi Sainta Maria. Valens fo e bons guerrers, e l'arcs e bons trobaire, e bels cavaliers. . . "Garin d'Apchier was a gentle cavalier from Gévaudan, from the bishopric of Mende, which is in the march of Auvergne and Rouergue and the bishopric of Le Puy-en-Velay. He was valiant and a good warrior, a good troubadour, and a beautiful knight. . ."

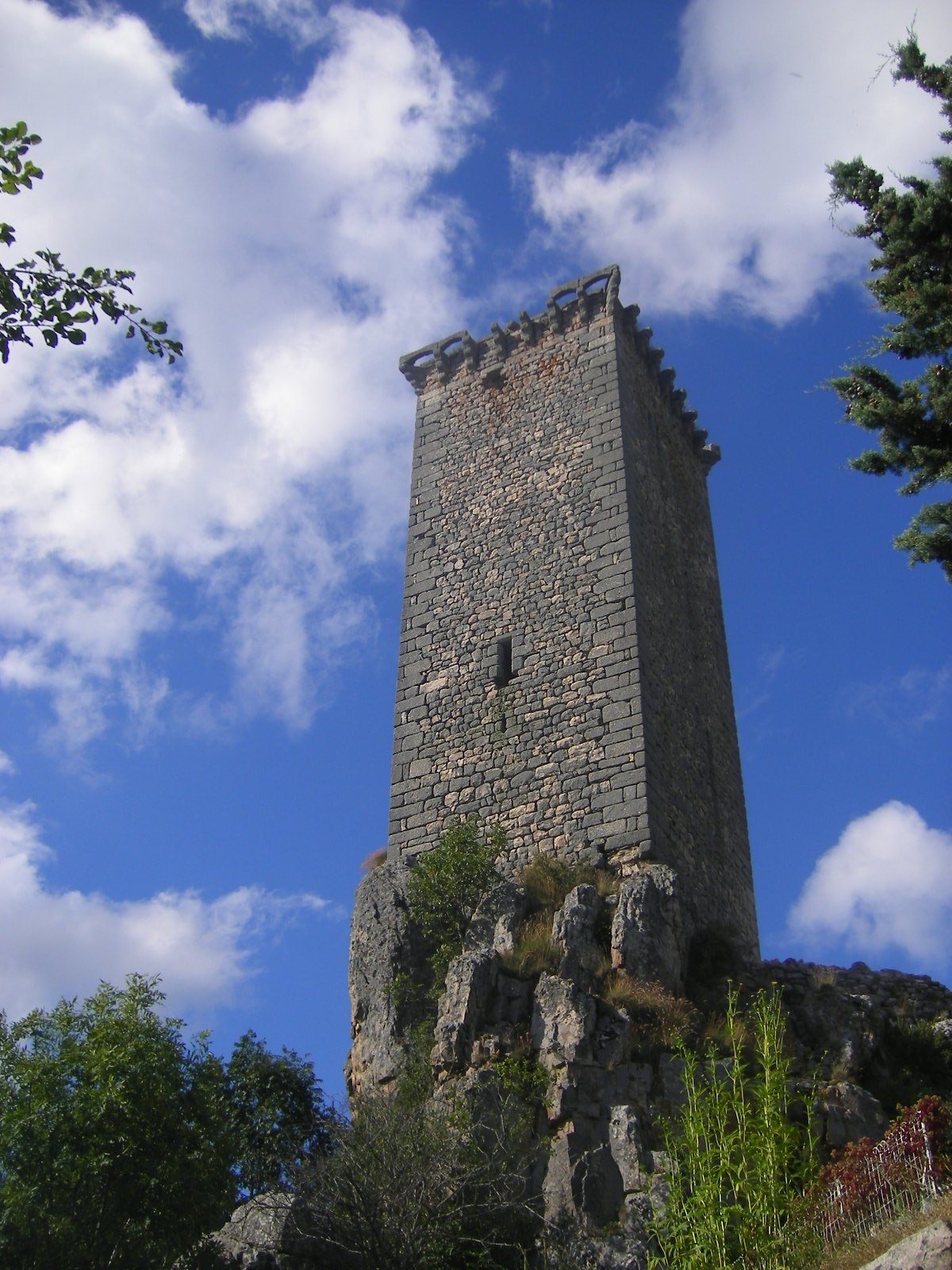
Garin's castle at Apcher.

Garin d'Apchier was an Auvergnat castellan and troubadour from Apcher in the Diocese of Mende in the Gévaudan. His life cannot be dated with precision. According to his vida he was "a valiant and good warrior ... and a handsome knight. And he knew all there was to know about love and gallantry."

Garin left behind three sirventes. According to his vida, he invented the descort genre of lyric poetry when he wrote the piece that begins Quan foill'e flors reverdezis / et aug lo chan del rossignol ("When the leaf and the flower bud / and I hear the song of the nightingale"), but this has now been lost. He wrote a short literary cycle of sirventes with Torcafol.

== Sources ==
- Egan, Margarita, ed. The Vidas of the Troubadours. New York: Garland, 1984. ISBN 0-8240-9437-9.
- Latella, Fortunata. Premessa all’edizione in linea dei sirventesi di Garin d’Apchier e Torcafol. 2002. (in Italian)
