= Organistrum =

Musical instrument

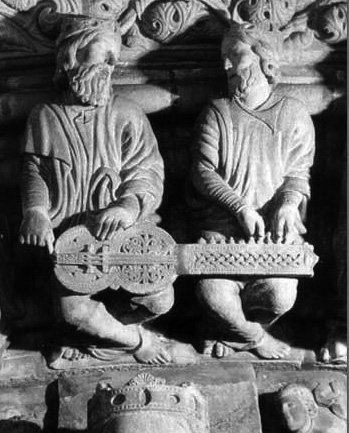
Elders of the Apocalypse playing an organistrum Santiago de Compostela, Spain

The organistrum is an early form of hurdy-gurdy, with a soundbox shaped like an 8 attached to a rectangular extension. Generally considered the ancestor of later hurdy-gurdies, the organistrum differs substantially in that it was played by two individuals: one turned the crank while the other pulled the keys upward to change the musical pitch of the strings. In other examples a player pushed levers forward to create the notes.

== Origins ==
The word organistrum is derived from organum and instrumentum; the former term was applied to the primitive harmonies, consisting of octaves accompanied by fourths or fifths, first practised by Hucbald in the 10th century. This explanation allows tolerable certainty about the period of its invention, at the end of the 10th or beginning of the 11th century. It also explains its construction. A stringed instrument of the period — such as a guitar fiddle, a rotta or oval vielle — was used as a model, while the proportions were increased for the convenience of holding the instrument and of dividing the performance between two persons (this happened in early models). Inside the body was the wheel, rosined like the bow of a violin, to create friction in its 3 melodic strings. The three strings resting on the wheel and supported on a bridge of the same height sounded together as the wheel revolved. In the earliest examples the wooden tangents took the place of fingers on the frets and acted upon all three strings at once, thus producing the harmony known as organum.

== Representations ==
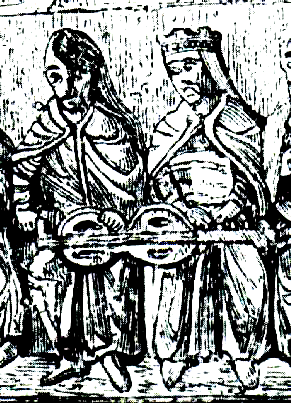
Sketch of the Boscherville relief

The organistrum appears on a bas-relief from the abbey of St Georges de Boscherville (11th century), preserved in the Rouen museum. A royal lady plays it while her maid turns the crank. It has the place of honour in the centre of the band of musicians representing the twenty-four elders of the Apocalypse in the tympanum of the Gate of Glory of the cathedral of Santiago de Compostela (12th century). A fine example appears in a miniature of a psalter of English workmanship (12th century), forming part of the Hunterian collection in Glasgow University.
