= Gacian Reyneau =

Burgundian composer

Gacian Reyneau (fl. 1398–1429) was a Burgundian composer at the court of Martin of Aragon. His sole surviving attributed work, the rondeau Va t'en mon cuer is one of the later works in the 1350-1420 span of the Codex Chantilly, written in the then "modern" simpler style. An edition of the rondeau is found in Willi Apel Corpus Mensurabilis Musicae Vol.53 1970. Several recordings have been made.
