= Kazimierz Wojciechowski =

Blessed Kazimierz Wojciechowski SDB

Orders
- Ordination: 19 May 1935 by Stanisław Rospond

Personal details
- Born: 16 August 1904 Jasło, Austria-Hungary (now Poland)
- Died: 27 June 1941 (aged 36) Auschwitz concentration camp

Sainthood
- Beatified: 6 June 2026; Kraków, Poland by Cardinal Marcello Semeraro

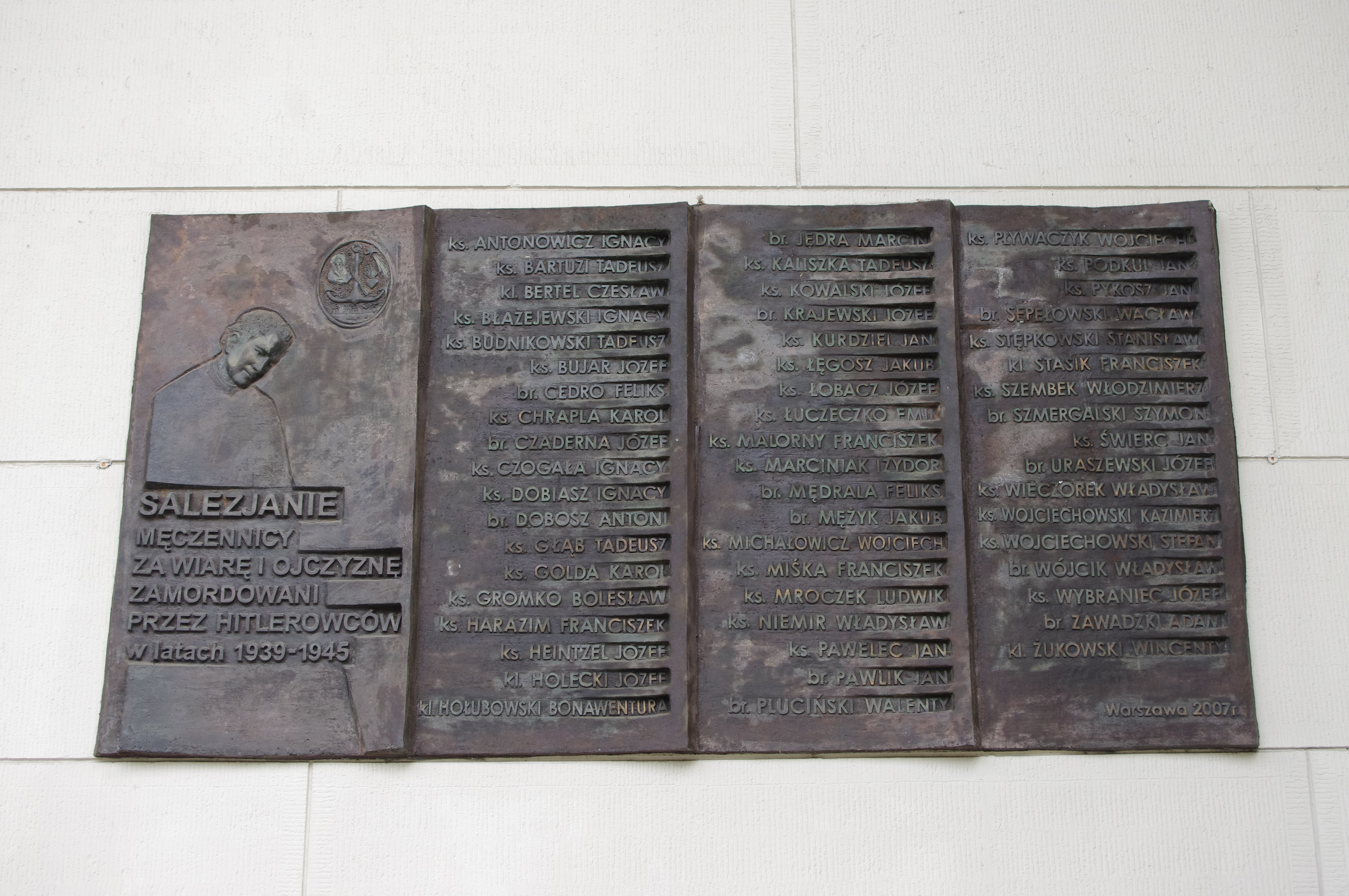
Plaque commemorating Salesian Martyrs in a Warsaw basilica; Wojciechowski is listed 6th from the bottom on the right.

Kazimierz Wojciechowski, SDB (16 August 1904 – 27 June 1941) was a Polish Catholic priest, a member of the Salesians of Don Bosco. He was involved in the education of the youth, and after the Nazi invasion of Poland was arrested by the Gestapo, imprisoned at Montelupich, and subsequently deported to the Auschwitz concentration camp, where he was murdered by two prisoner functionaries the day after arrival.

== Life and death ==
Wojciechowski was born in the Polish city of Jasło, one of the three children of Andrzej Wojciechowski, a railway employee, and his wife Marja Wojciechowska (née Boskówna). His father died when Wojciechowski was five-years' old. Owing to the efforts of his mother struggling single-handedly to support the family he was enrolled at the age of 8 at the Salesian-run boarding school for poor children (the Zakład Salezjański im. Lubomirskich w Krakowie) located in the ulica Rakowicka № 27 in Kraków. At school he was described as a vivacious and content child. In 1916 he entered a similar Silesian institution for older children located at the city of Oświęcim (the future site of Auschwitz during the Second World War) where in 1920 (while in the fourth year of the gimnazjum) he expressed the wish to enter the Salesian novitiate in Klecza Dolna. Accepted by the Salesians of Don Bosco, he professed his religious vows on 2 October 1921. Subsequently, he continued his studies at a Salesian academy in Kraków (the Wyższe Seminarium Duchowne Towarzystwa Salezjańskiego), and upon their completion was given a position at a minor seminary of the Salesians at Ląd in central Poland as an assistant tutor in mathematics and a singing-teacher (see picture to the right). He also taught music and singing at Salesian educational institutes at Antoniewo, Warsaw, Aleksandrów Kujawski, and in Oświęcim. He began his theological studies in Kraków in 1930, and upon their completion received holy orders at the hands of Bishop Stanisław Rospond (1877–1958) on 19 May 1935. He then taught for a year at a Salesian minor seminary in Daszawa near Stryj in Poland (now Stryi in Ukraine), on his return to Kraków taking on the duties of a catechist in elementary schools and those of a director of an oratorium and patron of Catholic youth organizations.

During the September Campaign Wojciechowski remained in Kraków rendering assistance to persons displaced by the hostilities of war. When the Nazis allowed the opening of schools in the General Government in November 1939, he returned to his school work.

In the evening hours of Friday, 23 May 1941, Wojciechowski — together with eleven of his Salesian confrères, including ten priests and one lay friar — was arrested by the Gestapo at the house in the ulica Konfederacka № 6 in the Dębniki district of Kraków (the site of a Salesian parish; see picture to the right) and imprisoned in the ulica Montelupich. At the Montelupich Prison Wojciechowski was informed that the reason for his arrest was his educational work fanning the patriotic sentiment among the Polish youth. After a detention of 34 days in duration at Montelupich, Wojciechowski was deported on 26 June 1941 to the nearby Auschwitz concentration camp, 66 km (41 miles) away. On arrival at the camp he received the inmate number 17342. The next day, 27 June 1941, Wojciechowski was impressed into a disciplinary work detail, the so-called Strafkompanie consisting of 12 prisoners engaged in gruelling excavation of the gravel yard that bordered on the concentration camp — the now famous historic site known in Polish as Żwirowisko and in German as Kiesplatz. During the morning shift of that day the supervising kapo broke Wojciechowski's teeth with a single blow from a shovel handle and separately injured his head with a lash from a riding crop. He had apparently attracted the attention of the kapo by his athletic and muscular build, which incited jealousy. This was also the time frame within which two of Wojciechowski's fellow-Salesians, Ignacy Dobiasz and Jan Świerc, were murdered and removed to crematorium. During the lunch break Wojciechowski was unable to eat on account of the sustained wounds. On the afternoon shift he was beaten again and when he complained he was thrown into a previously excavated gravel pit, told to lie down next to another Salesian friar, Franciszek Harazim (1885–1941; inmate number 17375), whom he observed lying at the bottom of the pit in a state of unconsciousness, and together with him was suffocated to death by having a single wooden pole thrown across both his and Harazim's necks, which was then weighed down by the bodies of two prisoner functionaries — a kapo and a barrack leader (blockälteste) — who stood on the pole at either end. Wojciechowski was 36-years' old.

The beatification process for Wojciechowski began on 17 September 2003. The diocesan phase of this process was concluded on 24 May 2011; his positio received approval from the Dicastery for the Causes of Saints on 28 March 2023. On 24 October 2025, he was recognized by Pope Leo XIV as having been martyred in odium fidei; He was beatified on 6 June 2026 by Marcello Semeraro, prefect for the Dicastery for the Causes of Saints, in Kraków.

== Bibliography ==
- Jacek Chrobaczyński, Słownik biograficzny nauczycieli w Małopolsce w latach II wojny światowej, 1939–1945: ofiary wojny, żołnierze, działacze konspiracyjni, nauczyciele w jawnym i tajnym szkolnictwie, Kraków, Wydawnictwo Naukowe WSP [ Wyższej Szkoły Pedagogicznej ], 1995, page 247. ISBN 8385898824. (A biographical dictionary of Lesser Poland-region teachers martyred during the Second World War.)
- Waldemar Żurek, Męczennik Żwirowiska: Sługa Boży ks. Kazimierz Wojciechowski SDB (1904–1941), Kraków, Wydawnictwo Poligrafia Salezjańska, 2005. ISBN 8388659308, ISBN 9788388659300. (The title translates as "The Martyr of the Gravel Pit".)
- Biography on the Biuletyn Informacyjny "Męczennicy" of Pelplin (see online).

== See also ==
- 108 Martyrs of World War II
- Servant of God
- List of Servants of God
