= Görlitz Synagogue =

Synagogue in Görlitz, Germany

- German: Kulturforum Görlitzer Synagoge
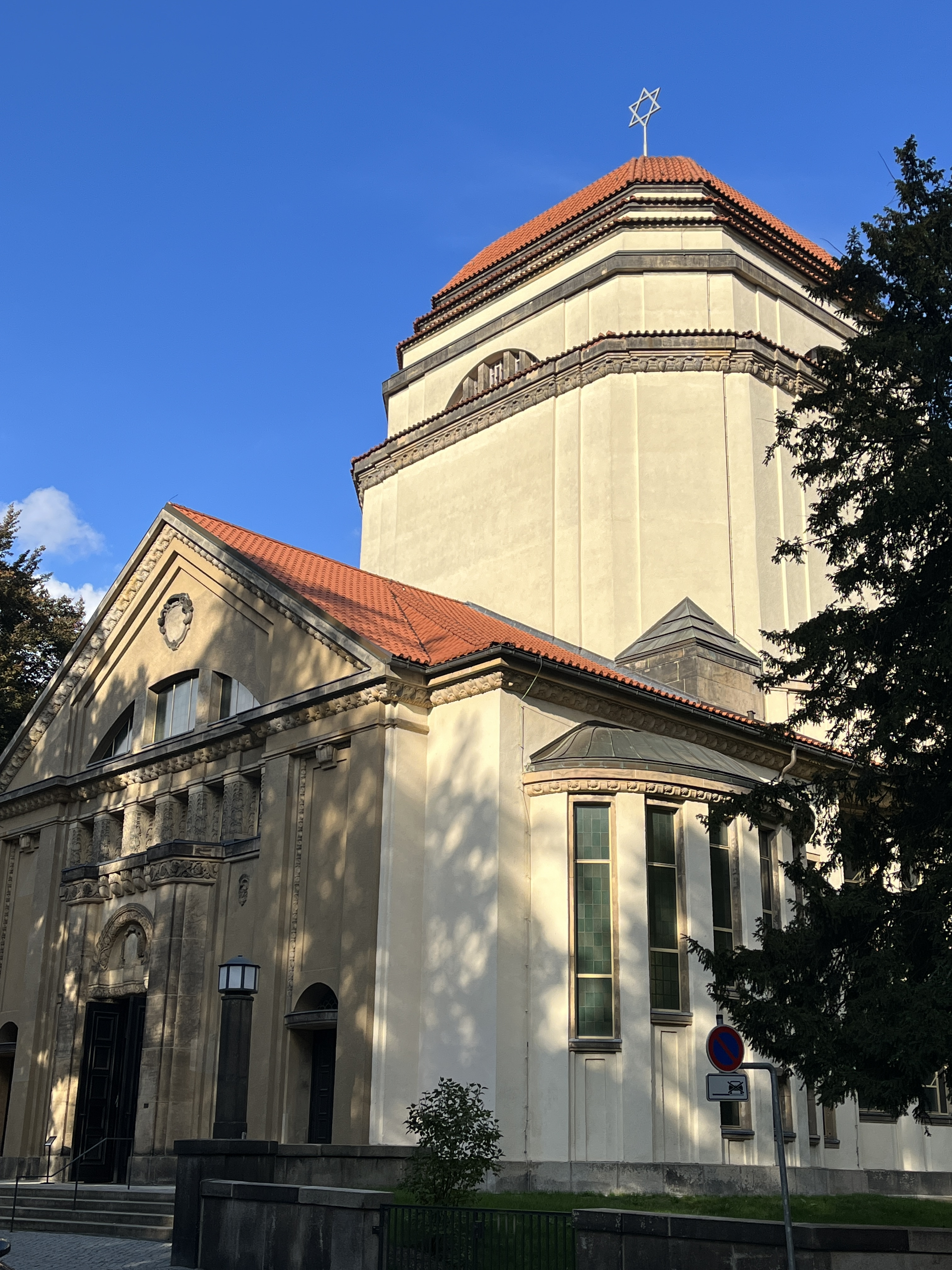
- The synagogue, following restoration, in 2022

Religion
- Affiliation: Judaism
- Rite: Nusach Ashkenaz
- Ecclesiastical or organizational status: Synagogue
- Status: Active (1911–1940); Inactive (1940–1945); Active (1945–1963); Inactive (1963–2021); Active (since 2021)

Location
- Location: Otto-Müller-Straße, Görlitz
- Country: Germany
- Interactive map of Görlitz Synagogue
- Coordinates: 51°09′10″N 14°59′28″E

Architecture
- Architects: William Lossow; Hans Max Kühne
- Type: Synagogue architecture
- Style: Art Nouveau
- Established: c. 1850s (as a congregation)
- Groundbreaking: 1909
- Completed: 1911

Specifications
- Capacity: 230 seats
- Materials: Brick

Website
- synagoge-goerlitz.de/geschichte-und-bedeutung

The Görlitz Synagogue (German: Kulturforum Görlitzer Synagoge) is a Jewish congregation and synagogue, located on Otto-Müller-Straße, in Görlitz, Germany. Built between 1909 and 1911 in the Art Nouveau style, the synagogue was the main place of worship for the city's Ashkenazi Jewish community. Despite an arson attack, the synagogue was one of the few synagogues in the area to survive Kristallnacht, sustaining only minor damage. The damage was lessened as firefighters ignored the Nazi German orders to let the synagogue burn. With the city's Jewish population depleted, the unused synagogue became a ruin in the following decades.

A restoration project began in 1991 and was completed in December 2020. Owing to the COVID-19 pandemic, the opening ceremony was postponed until July 12, 2021. On September 12, 2022, a new Magen David was placed on top of the synagogue.

Also in Görlitz, a former Ashkenazi synagogue, now factory, is located at Langenstrasse 24, built in the 19th century.

== History ==
The Jewish community in Görlitz grew from 150 residents in 1852 to 643 residents in 1880. The Old Synagogue (Langenstrasse) in the historic part of the town (which still stands and is used as a house of literature) became too small for the growing Jewish community. The architects William Lossow and Max Hans Kühne (famous for designing the main train station in Leipzig) made architectural plans for the new synagogue in Görlitz. They chose Art Nouveau as the leading style of the building, which differed from the more oriental-looking style of synagogues of that time. After two years of construction, the synagogue was opened on March 7, 1911.

From 1933 to 1945 under the reign of Nazi Germany, Jews fled Görlitz and/or were deported. The synagogue survived Kristallnacht on November 9, 1938, without major structural damage. The arson attack wasn't foiled, but the fire was extinguished by the fire department before any severe damage was done to the building's structure. The final religious service took place in September 1940.

After World War II, the Soviet military administration transferred ownership to the nearby Jewish community in Dresden. The small community in Dresden couldn't afford the maintenance costs of the building and sold it back to the Görlitz city administration (GDR) in November, 1963.

After German reunification, funds were raised and efforts were undertaken to save the building from collapse. The restoration between 1991 and 2020 cost approximately €10 million.

The 70th anniversary of the Kristallnacht pogrom was commemorated by the Görlitz City Council, through the synagogue support group Förderkreis Görlitzer Synagoge, e. V., on November 9, 2008.

The building comprises the Kuppelsaal, originally with room for about 550 worshippers, restored to accommodate 310 visitors; and the Wochentags-Synagogue, with room originally for approximately 50 worshippers, that now accommodates 20. The city council decided that the Wochentags-Synagogue will be retained for Jewish worship. As the Jewish community in Görlitz has reduced significantly from its peak, the Kuppelsaal was used for tours to show the Jewish history of Görlitz and can be booked for events and conferences.

On August 20, 2021, the first Jewish worship after 80 years was held in the synagogue.

On December 16, 2021, fragments of the Torah scroll believed lost in the pogrom night were handed over to the city of Görlitz. They were in the custody of the Kunnerwitz priest for over 50 years.

== Reconstructing the Magen David ==
The Magen David on the roof of the synagogue was broken off and destroyed the day after Kristallnacht. After the Jewish Community of Dresden sold the building to the Görlitz city administration in November 1963, the building wasn't consecrated anymore. Plans for restoration in the early 1990s didn't intend to re-install the Magen David. Discussions between the city and the FGS about the rebuilding of the Magen David in 2008 were blocked by the city administration. At that time, the cost of rebuilding the Magen David was estimated to be €13,000. With an open letter of the society for promoting the synagogue (Förderkreis Görlitzer Synagoge e.V.) in mid-2020, discussions about re-installing the Magen David began again.

For several years the Jewish community in Dresden declined to support a re-installation of a new Magen David; however, in 2017 both the city administration and the Jewish community reached agreement. During roof refurbishment in the 1990s structural support was not put in place to install the Magen David. Hence, in 2020, structural engineers were commissioned to find a proper solution. The estimated cost of €70,000 was supported by donations. Alex Jacobowitz, a musician and chairman of the Jewish community in Görlitz, agreed to a significant donation; and in May 2021 a gift of €70,000 to the city was received from an anonymous donor. On September 12, 2022, a new Magen David was placed on top of the synagogue.

== Gallery ==
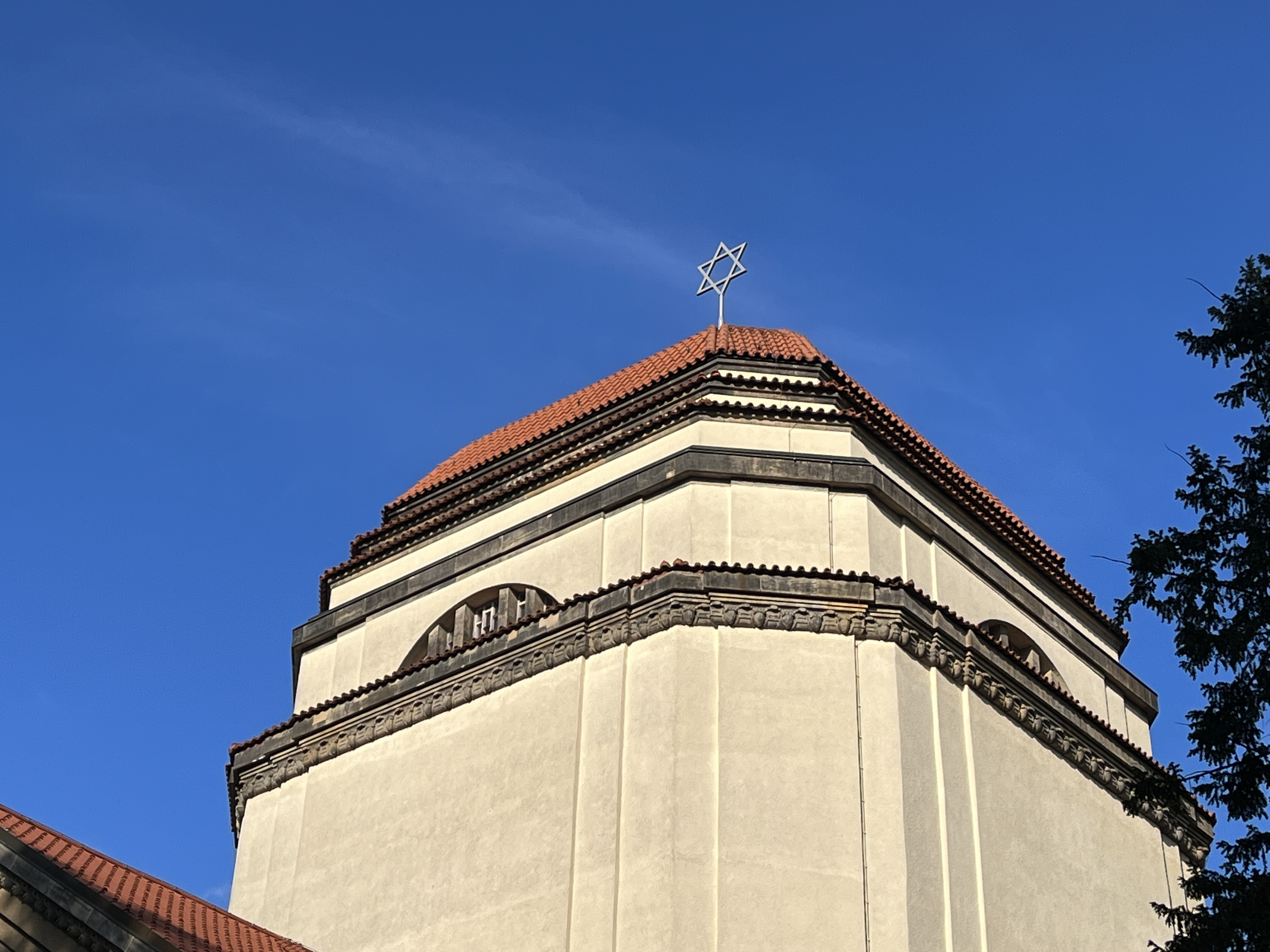
Dome with Magen David

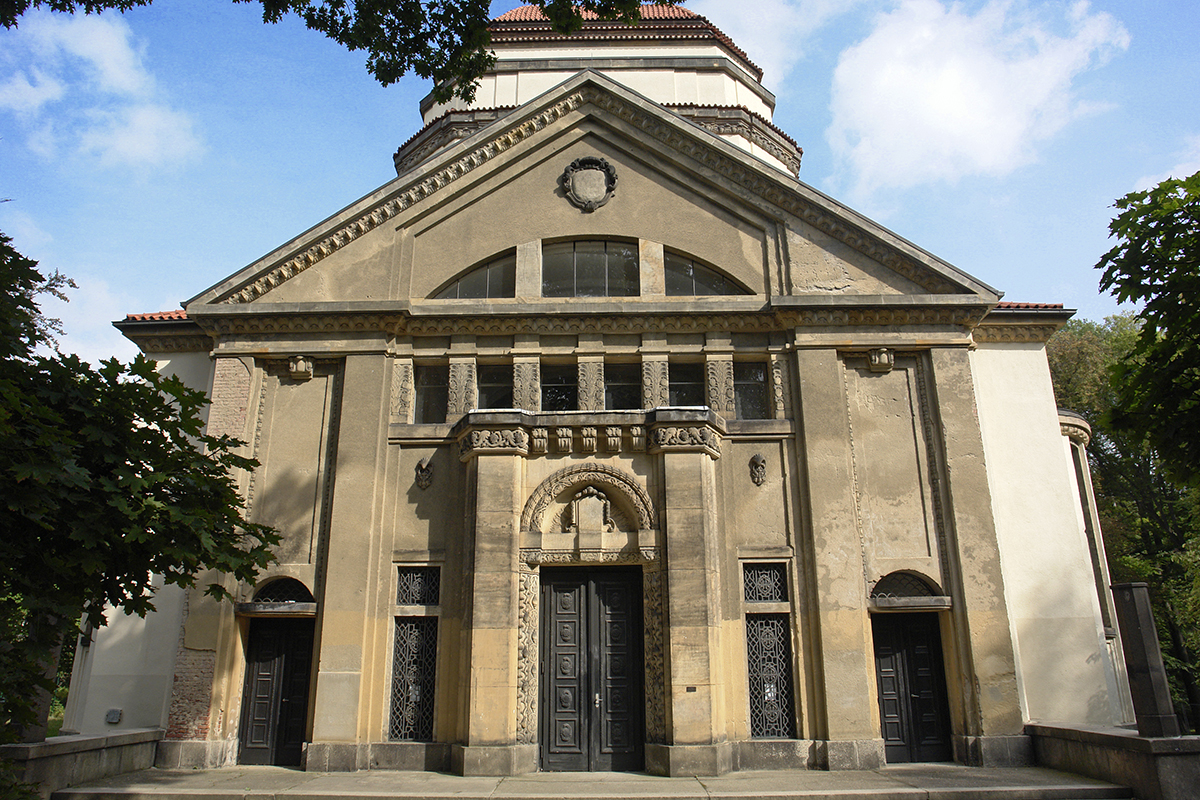
Portal

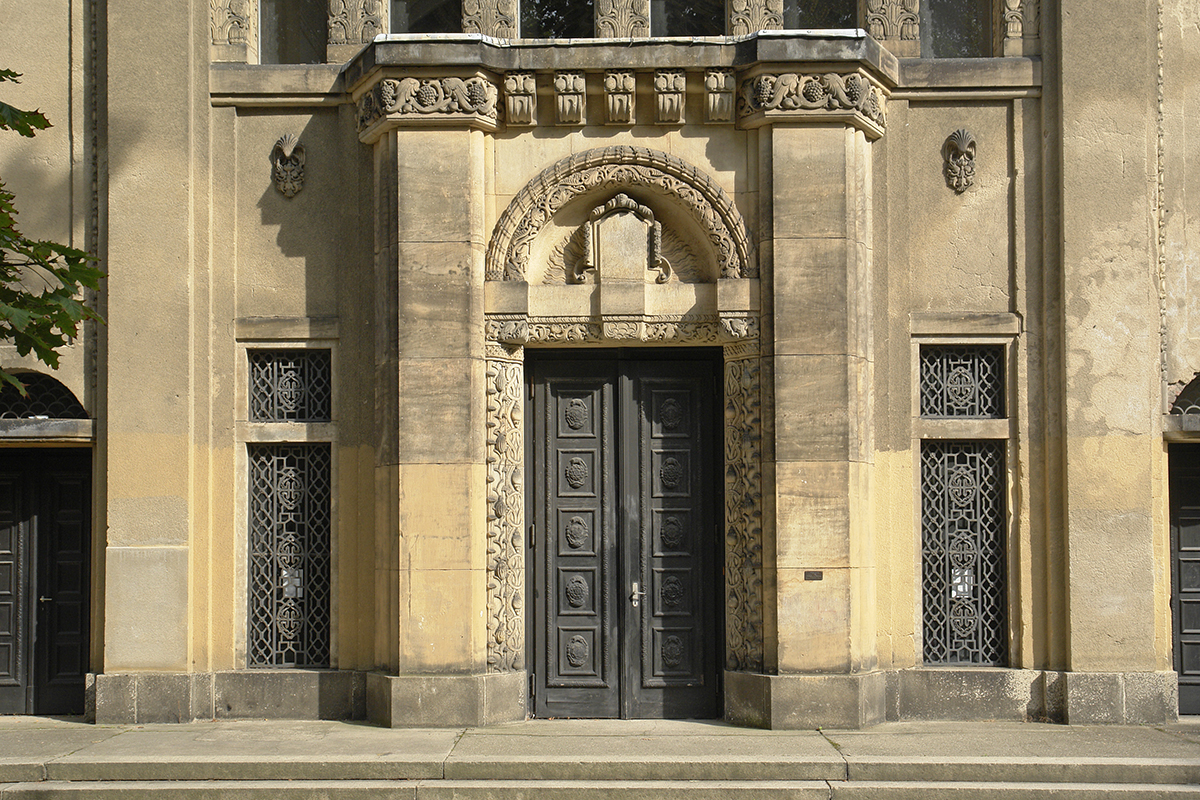
Entrance

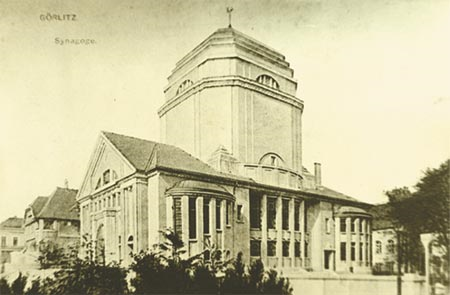
The synagogue in 1912

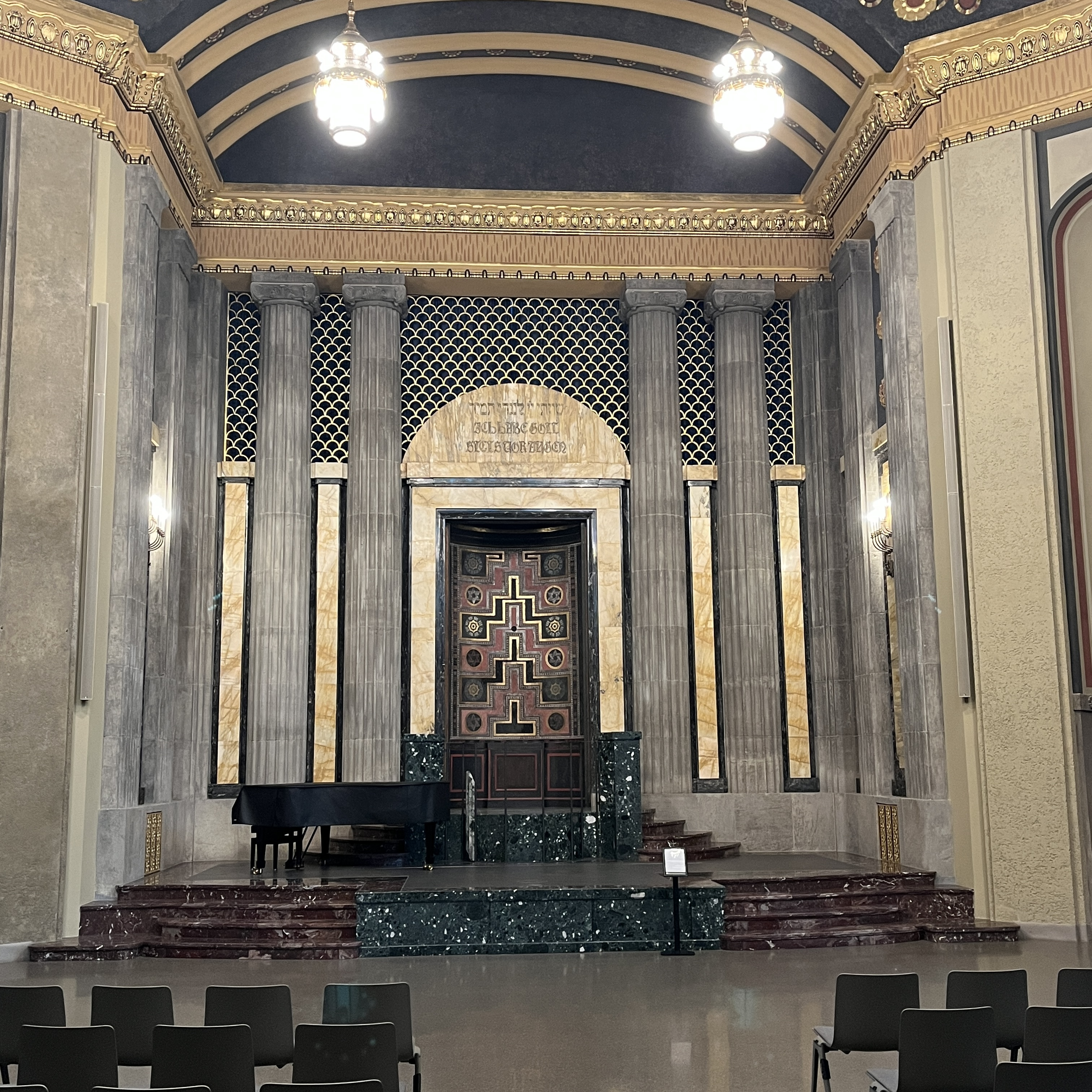
Torah Shrine

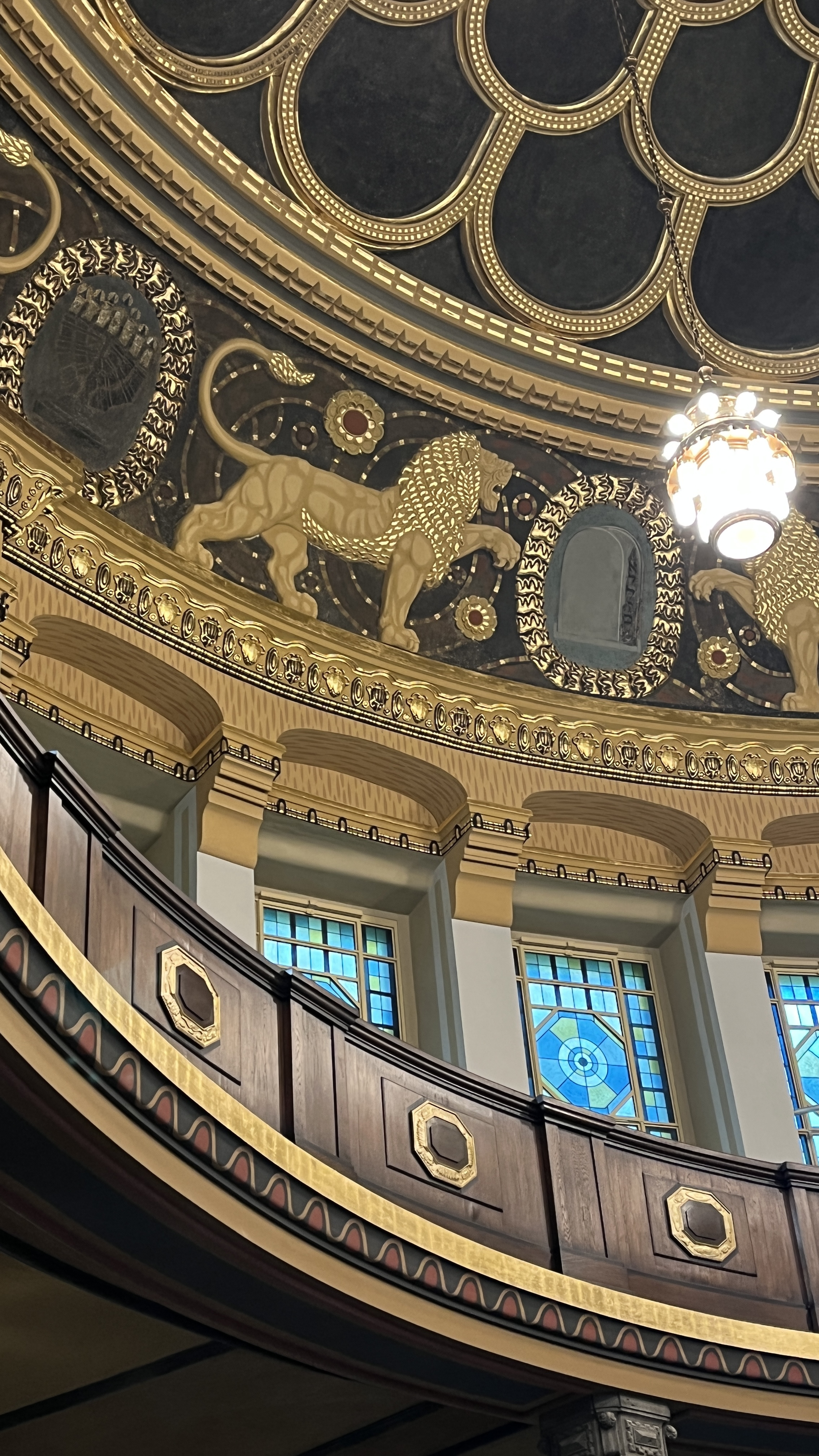
Lion Frieze in Dome Hall

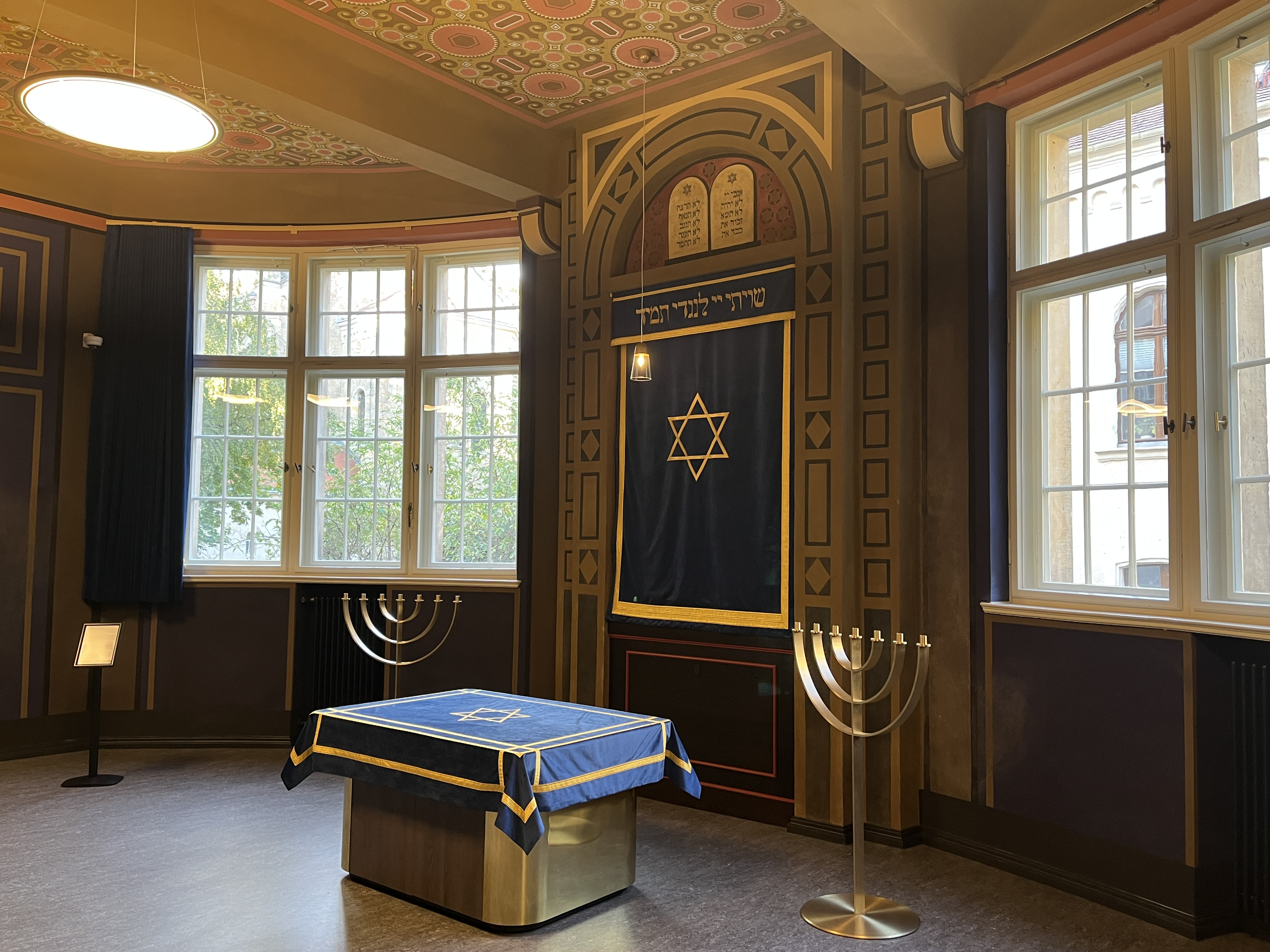
Wochentags-Synagogue

== See also ==
- History of the Jews in Germany
- List of synagogues in Germany (in German)
