= Babica =

Babica may refer to the following places:

- Babica, Lesser Poland Voivodeship, Poland
- Babica, Podkarpackie Voivodeship, Poland
- Babica (Kuršumlija), a community in Serbia
