= Monophony =

Musical texture

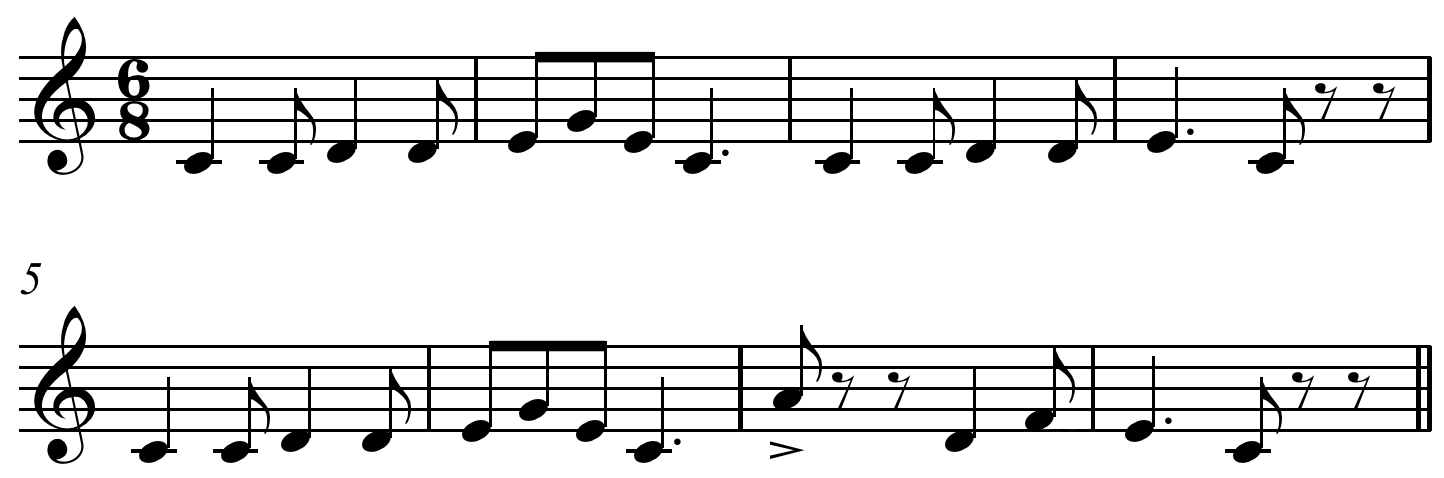
This melody for the traditional song "Pop Goes the Weasel" is monophonic as long as it is performed without chordal accompaniment.

In music, monophony is the simplest of musical textures, consisting of a melody (or "tune"), typically sung by a single singer or played by a single instrument player (e.g., a flute player) without accompanying harmony or chords. Many folk songs and traditional songs are monophonic. A melody is also considered to be monophonic if a group of singers (e.g., a choir) sings the same melody together at the unison (exactly the same pitch) or with the same melody notes duplicated at the octave (such as when men and women sing together). If an entire melody is played by two or more instruments or sung by a choir with a fixed interval, such as a perfect fifth, it is also said to be monophony (or "monophonic"). The musical texture of a song or musical piece is determined by assessing whether varying components are used, such as an accompaniment part or polyphonic melody lines (two or more independent lines).

Monophony differs from heterophony (two singers or instrumentalists doing varied versions of the same melody together), polyphony (two or more singers or instrumentalists playing independent melodic lines at the same time), homophony (a melody accompanied by chords), or monody (a single melodic line with instrumental accompaniment) elements throughout the melody to create different atmospheres and styles. Monophony may not have underlying rhythmic textures and must consist of only a single melodic line.

Pange Lingua sung
This is the plainchant version (mode iii) of Pange Lingua sung to its traditional Latin text.

The Four Ogives
Erik Satie The Four Ogives. Their calm, slow melodies are built up from paired phrases reminiscent of plainchant.

Liber Usualis, Antiphon "O Adonai II: Great Advent Antiphon"
A monophonic Antiphon from the Gregorian Chant collection Liber Usualis

== Western singing ==
According to the modern medieval scholar Ardis Butterfield, monophony "is the dominant mode of the European vernacular genres as well as of Latin song. ... In polyphonic works, it remains a central compositional principle."

=== Plainchant ===
The earliest recorded Christian monophony was plainchant or plainsong (of which one well-known style was called Gregorian chant) a single unaccompanied vocal melody sung by monks. Sung by multiple voices in unison (i.e. the same pitch and rhythm), this music is still considered monophonic. Plainsong was the first and foremost musical style of Italy, Ireland, Spain, and France. In the early 9th century, the organum tradition developed by adding voices in parallel to plainchant melodies. The earliest organum merely augmented the texture of the melody by adding a second voice in parallel octaves or parallel fifths, which could still be considered monophonic; however, by the 11th century the organum had developed a style called "free organum" in which the voices were more independent, evolving into a polyphonic tradition.

Gregorian chant of the Kyrie (plainsong)

=== Troubador song monophony ===
Most troubadour songs were monophonic. Troubadour songs were written from 1100–1350 and they were usually poems about chivalry or courtly love with the words set to a melody. Aristocratic troubadours and trouvères typically played in courtly performances for kings, queens, and countesses. Poets and composers in the 14th century produced many songs which can be seen as extensions of the Provençal troubador tradition, such as secular monophonic lais and virelais. Jehan de Lescurel (or Jehannot de l'Escurel), a poet and composer from northern French from the Trouvère style also wrote monophonic songs in the style of virelais, ballades, rondeaux and diz entés. Minnesänger were similar to the French style but in Middle High German.

=== Geisslerlieder or Flagellant songs ===
A tradition of Lauda, or sacred songs in the style of Troubador songs, was popularized in the 13th and 14th centuries by Geisslerlieder, or Flagellant songs. These monophonic Laude spirituale songs were used in the 13th and 17th century by flagellants, as recorded in the medieval chronicle Chronicon Hugonis sacerdotis de Rutelinga (1349).

=== Lutheran church chorale ===
Monophony was the first type of texture in the Lutheran Church. A well-known example is Martin Luther's hymn "Ein feste Burg ist unser Gott" ("A Mighty Fortress Is Our God"), written as a monophonic tune sometime between 1527 and 1529. Many of Luther's hymns were later harmonized for multiple voices by other composers, and were also used in other polyphonic music such as the cantatas of Johann Sebastian Bach.

== Monophony with instrumental doubling ==
See Voicing (music)#Doubling

DeLone more loosely defines monophony as "passages, movements, or sections in which notes sound alone, despite instrumental doubling" even if "such passages may involve several instruments or voices."

== Music of India ==
Indian classical music is an ancient musical tradition where monophonic melodies called ragas are played over drones, sometimes accompanied by percussion and other accompaniment. The two major traditions are:

- Hindustani music from the North of India
- Carnatic music from the South of India, encompassing compositions in Kannada, Telugu, Tamil, Sanskrit, and Malayalam.

== See also ==
- Drone (music)
- Duophonic
- Voicing (music)#Doubling
