= Klecza Górna =

- Village
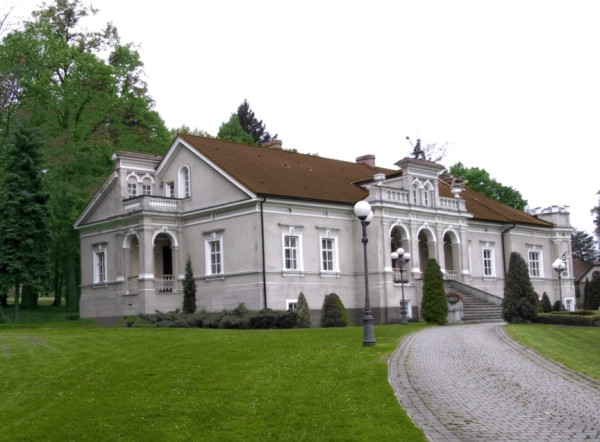
- Manor

- Location within Poland
- Coordinates: 49°52′N 19°34′E
- Country: Poland
- Voivodeship: Lesser Poland
- County: Wadowice
- Gmina: Wadowice
- Population: 716

Klecza Górna [ˈklɛt͡ʂa ˈɡurna] is a village in the administrative district of Gmina Wadowice, within Wadowice County, Lesser Poland Voivodeship, in southern Poland.
