= Emil Zegadłowicz =

Polish writer

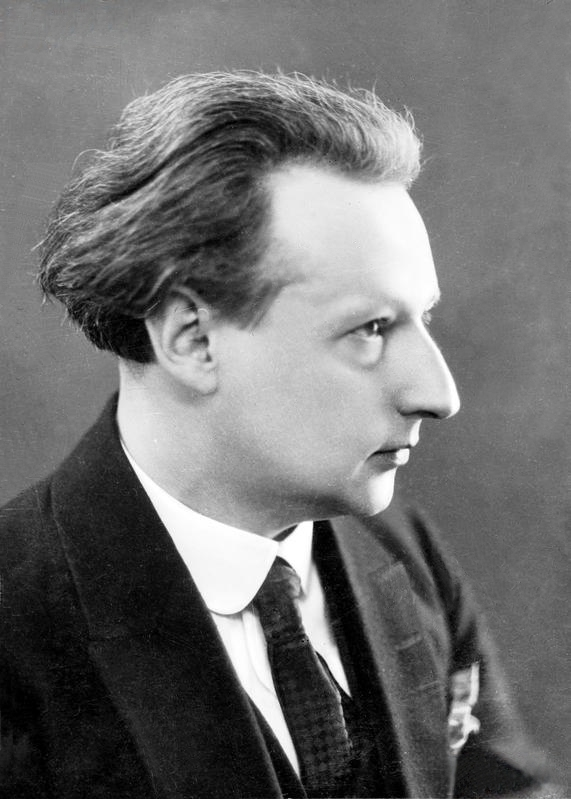
- Born: 20 July 1888; Biała, Kingdom of Galicia and Lodomeria, Austria-Hungary
- Died: 24 February 1941 (aged 52); Sosnowitz, Gau Upper Silesia, Nazi Germany
- Occupations: Poet, writer, translator
- Writing career
- Genre: Expressionism
- Notable works: Zmory, Motory

Emil Zegadłowicz (20 July 1888 – 24 February 1941) was a Polish poet, prose writer, novelist, playwright, translator, expert of art; co-originator of Polish expressionism, member of expressionists' group Zdrój, co-founder of group Czartak.

== Biography ==
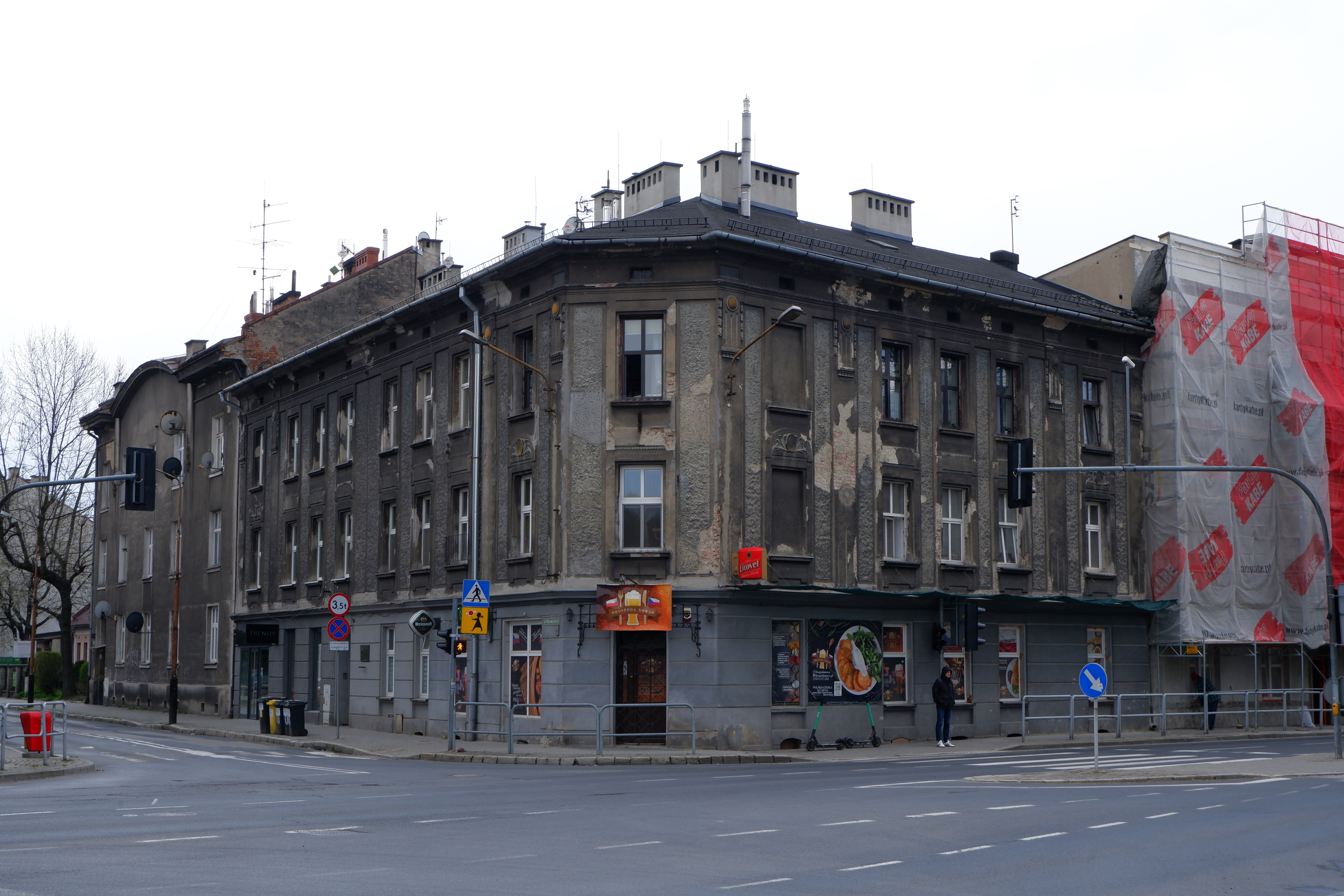
Tenement house in Biała, birthplace of Emil Zegadłowicz

Zegadłowicz was born on 20 July 1888 in Biała, now part of Bielsko-Biała in to the family of a teacher. From 1906 to 1911 he studied Polish philology, German philology and history of art at Jagiellonian University in Kraków, then he continued his studies in Vienna and Dresden. Although born in a German language island of Bielsko and Biała, he wasn't much connected with this region and lived in Gorzeń Górny near Wadowice and Poznań.

From 1917 to 1922 he collaborated with group of Poznań expressionists related with periodical Zdrój. In 1919 became an officeholder of the Ministry of Culture and Art. He initiated and co-founded regional literary group and periodical Czartak. From 1927 to 1931 was a literary manager of Polish Theatre in Poznań. He was an editor of Roman Catholic periodical Tęcza (1928–1929), editor of theatre magazine Świat Kulis, programme director in Poznań broadcasting station of Polskie Radio. In 1933–1934 he was a literary manager in theatre of Katowice. In 1934 he became an editor of periodical Wieś. Later Zegadłowicz fall afoul of Roman Catholic Church and the Right, and in 1936 became a sympathiser of the Left.

He died on 24 February 1941 in Sosnowiec, German-occupied Poland.

== Works ==
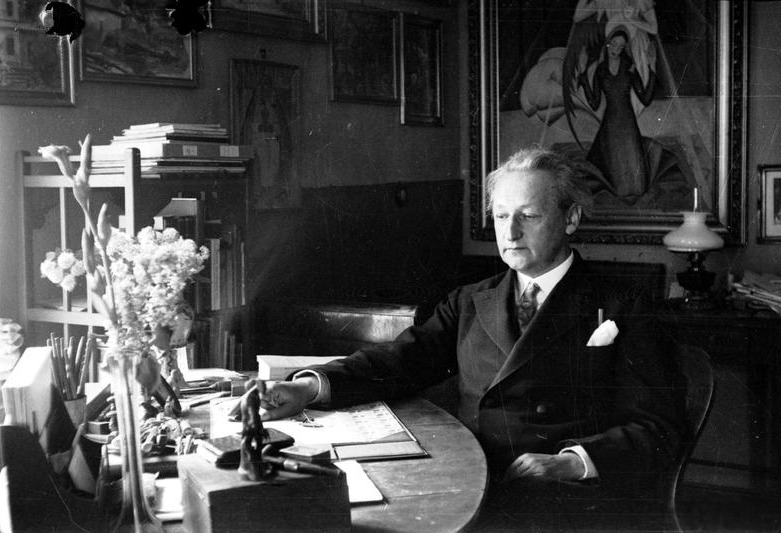
Poet in his home, Gorzeń Górny, June 1933.

- Powsinogi beskidzkie (1923)
- Kolędziołki beskidzkie (1923)
- Żywot Mikołaja Srebrempisanego (1927–1929)
- Zmory (1935)
- Motory (1938)
- Wasz korespondent donosi (1939, theatre play, missing)
- Domek z kart (1940, theatre play)
