= Roków =

- Village
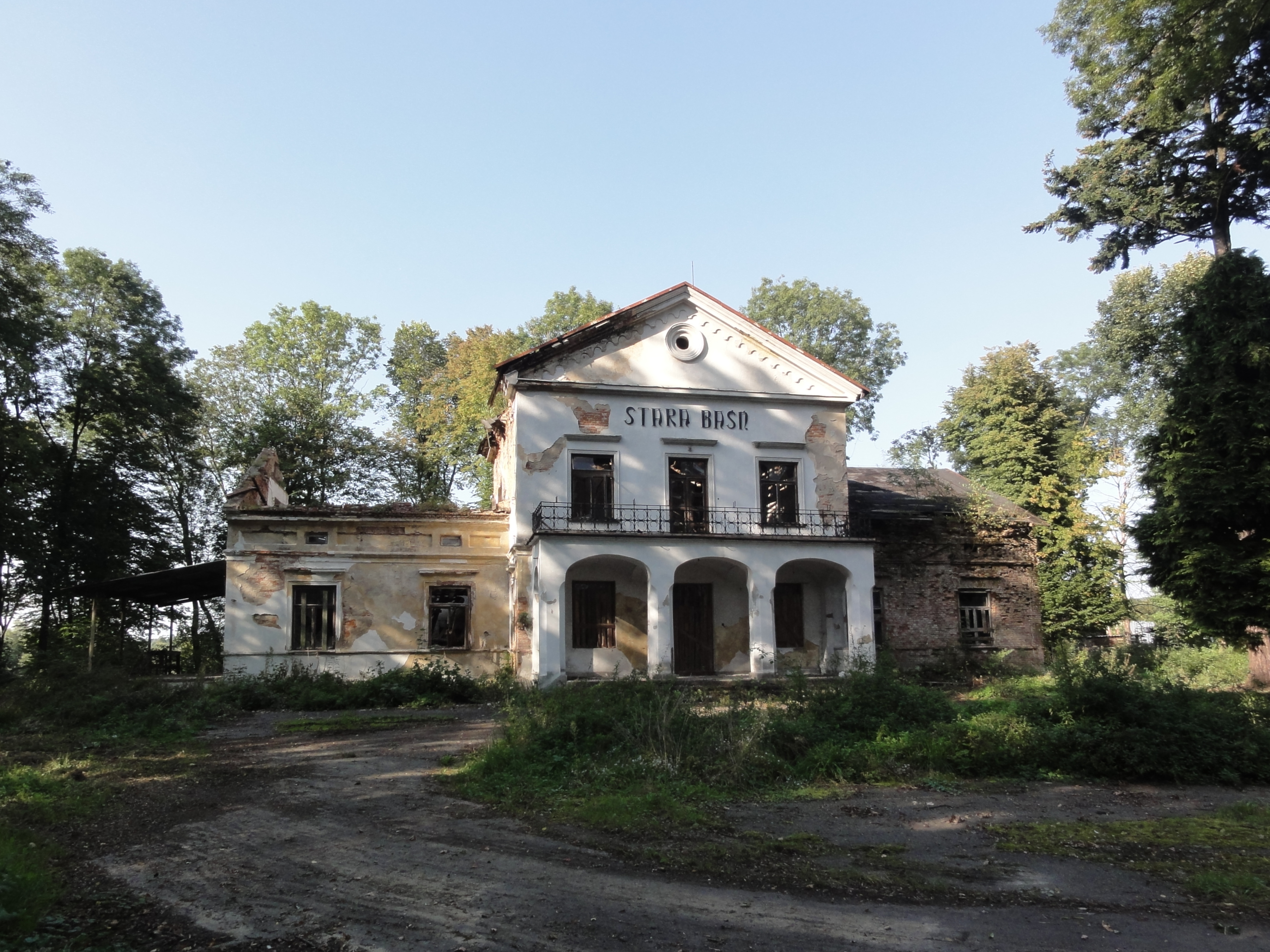
- Palace in Roków

- Location within Poland
- Coordinates: 49°55′N 19°31′E
- Country: Poland
- Voivodeship: Lesser Poland
- County: Wadowice
- Gmina: Wadowice
- Population: 316

Roków [ˈrɔkuf] is a village in the administrative district of Gmina Wadowice, within Wadowice County, Lesser Poland Voivodeship, in southern Poland.
