= Janina Brzostowska =

Polish poet, novelist and translator

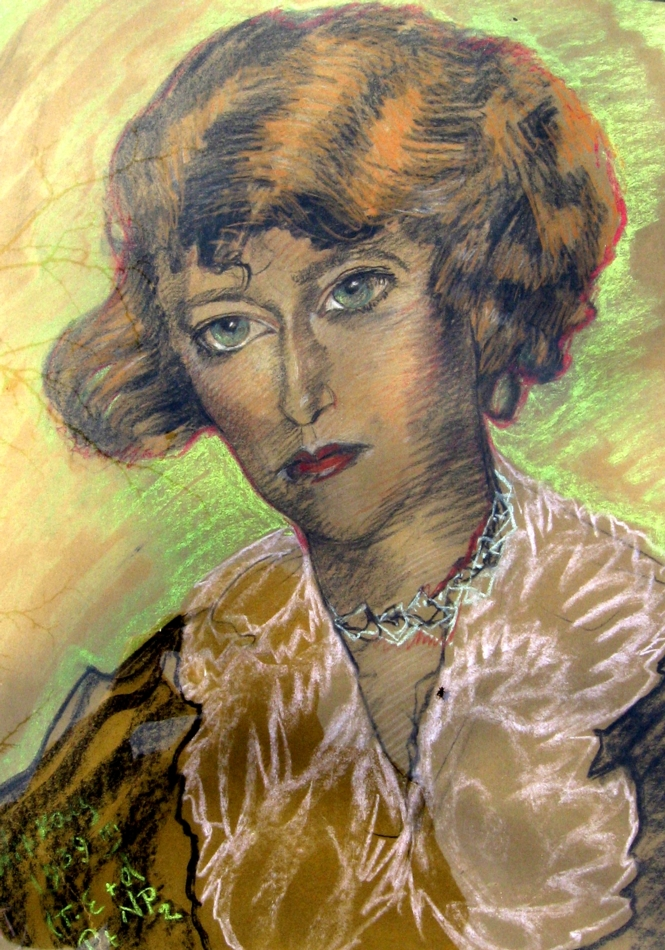
1939 portrait by Stanisław Ignacy Witkiewicz

Janina Brzostowska (9 July 1897 – 18 March 1986) was a Polish poet, novelist and translator.

== Life ==
Janina Brzostowska was born on 9 July 1897 in Wadowice, the daughter of a high school principal. She studied Polish and French at the Jagiellonian University in Kraków, where her family moved. In 1924 she joined the "Czartak" group of poets, and published her first volume of poetry, On Land and My Love, in 1925. She then formally left Czartak in 1929, though she maintained ties with the other poets there.

Brzostowska moved to Warsaw, publishing her first novel, The Jobless of Warsaw, in 1933. The novel was removed from publication by the censors. Her second novel, A Woman Conquers the World, dealt with a woman's coming of age. From 1938 to 1939, Brzostowska helped edit the bimonthly Skawa. In 1939 she published two volumes of lyrical verse, dealing with love and the passage of time. During the German occupation of Poland, Brzostowska joined the resistance movement. Deported from Warsaw after the 1944 Uprising, she was one of the first to return to the ruins of the city. She kept writing poetry after the war, publishing a complete translation of the Songs of Sappho in 1961.

== Works ==
=== Poetry ===
- (tr.) Pieśni by Sappho, 1961
- Zanim noc... [Until the night...], 1961
- Czas nienazwany [Time without name], 1964
- Obrona światła [In defence of light], 1968
- Pozdrowienie [Greetings], 1969
- Szczęścia szukamy [In search of happiness], 1974
- Eros, 1977
- Poezje zebrane [Collected poems], 1981.

=== Novels ===
- Bezrobotni Warszawy [The Jobless of Warsaw], 1933
- Kobieta zdobywa swiat [A Woman Conquers the World], 1937
