= Gmina Wadowice =

Gmina Wadowice Wadowice Commune
- Gmina
- Coat of arms
- Interactive map of Gmina Wadowice
- Coordinates (Wadowice): 49°53′N 19°30′E
- Country: Poland
- Voivodeship: Lesser Poland
- County: Wadowice
- Seat: Wadowice

Area
  - Total: 113 km^{2} (44 sq mi)

Population (2006)
  - Total: 37,481
  - Density: 332/km^{2} (859/sq mi)
  - Urban: 19,149
  - Rural: 18,332
- Website: http://www.wadowice.pl/

Gmina Wadowice is an urban-rural gmina (administrative district) in Wadowice County, Lesser Poland Voivodeship, in southern Poland. Its seat is the town of Wadowice, which lies approximately 38 kilometres (24 mi) south-west of the regional capital Kraków.

The gmina covers an area of 113 square kilometres (43.6 sq mi), and as of 2006 its total population is 37,481 (of which the population of Wadowice is 19,149, and the population of the rural part of the gmina is 18,332).

== Villages ==
Apart from the town of Wadowice, Gmina Wadowice contains the villages and settlements of Babica, Barwałd Dolny, Chocznia, Gorzeń Dolny, Gorzeń Górny, Jaroszowice, Kaczyna, Klecza Dolna, Klecza Górna, Ponikiew, Ponikiew-Chobot, Roków, Stanisław Górny, Wysoka and Zawadka.

== Neighbouring gminas ==
Gmina Wadowice is bordered by the gminas of Kalwaria Zebrzydowska, Mucharz, Stryszów, Tomice, Wieprz and Zembrzyce.
