= Alex Jacobowitz =

American musician and street performer

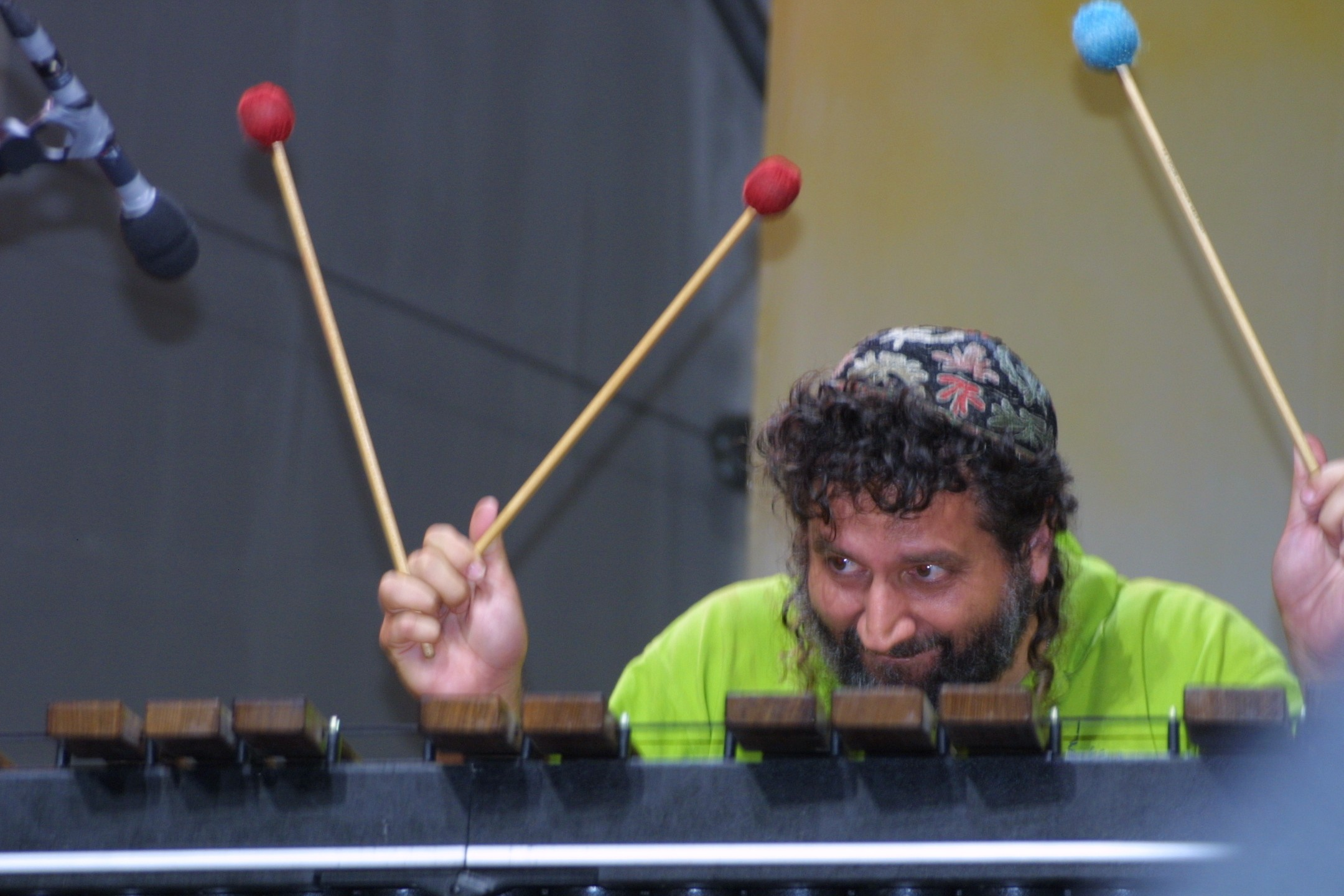

Background information
- Born: May 19, 1960 (age 66); New York City
- Occupation: Street performer
- Instruments: Marimba, Xylophone

Alex Jacobowitz (born 19 May 1960 in New York) is a classically trained concert artist and street performer who plays the marimba and xylophone.

== New York ==
During the early 1980s he studied music at the State University of New York at Binghamton, studying marimba privately with Gordon Stout at Ithaca College, John Beck at the Eastman School of Music and privately with Leigh Howard Stevens. Soon thereafter, he began a busking career in the late 1980's, playing on the streets of New York City, including at Lincoln Center's "Meet the Artist" program, Yeshiva University, Zabar's, Central Park, the 84th Street Synagogue, International House, the New York Hilton, Metropolitan Museum of Art, and Coney Island's "Sideshows by the Seashore". Alex Jacobowitz commissioned Edith Borroff to compose "Concerto for Marimba and Small Orchestra" in 1981, and it was premiered on November 23, 1981 with the State University of New York at Binghamton's University Symphony Orchestra, under conductor Paul Jordan. This work might be the first marimba concerto composed by a woman.

From 1984-1989 he was an Official Street Performer at the South Street Seaport in Lower Manhattan, a member of Musicians Under New York, and Young Audiences of Rochester and the Northeast Intermediate Unit#19 (Pennsylvania). He has performed at Arts Councils and Imagination Celebrations throughout New York State. He has performed on Entertainment Tonight, and has been an artist-in-residence at Artpark (New York) and Holland Village (Japan). He received his Master's Degree in Music Performance in 2021 from Ithaca College in New York.

== Europe ==
In 1991, he moved to Europe, mainly performing in Germany, and living in Berlin. Jacobowitz performed classic and Jewish traditional music on German television (ARD, ZDF, Third Programmes), and occasionally in Hungary, Israel, Italy, Luxembourg, South Korea, Poland, Portugal, Switzerland, Russia and Ukraine. In 2006, he was invited to perform at the Busker's Festival in Ferrara, Italy, and his music was often featured in radio, including NPR in the USA, Bayerischer Rundfunk in Germany and SFR1 in Switzerland.

== Klezmer ==
In 1994, he began the study of traditional Jewish instrumental music (klezmer) with Giora Feidman. In 1997, he saw Brave Old World in concert, and trained under Alan Bern, their musical director.

Solo klezmer appearances include festivals in Jerusalem, Schleswig-Holstein, Safed, Kraków, Fürth, Bamberg, synagogues throughout Germany, including Oranienburgerstrasse Synagogue in Berlin, Chabad Houses in Prague, Geneva, Zürich, the Jewish Museum in Frankfurt, Hackescher Hoftheater in Berlin, Kibbutz Nahal Oz, Kibbutz Ma'ale HaChamisha, and settlement Mitzpe Jericho.

He has performed with Shelly Lang's Neginah Orchestra (NYC), the Jerusalem Symphony Orchestra, and the Berlin Kammerphilharmoniker. He has performed Jewish music at Pisa's Jewish Festival (Italy, 2011) Sydney's Shir Madness festival (Australia, 2010), the Warsaw Jewish Festival (Poland, 2012), the Trondheim Jewish Culture Festival (Norway, 2012), the Düsseldorf Jewish Film Festival (2012, Germany), the Budapest Jewish Film Festival (Hungary, 2012) and the 4th Munich (München) Jüdische Filmtage (Jewish Film Festival, January 2013), the Jewish Cultural Days in Vienna (2014), Jewish Week in Leipzig (2015).

Since 2010 he has been performing klezmer music with violinists Yona (Stas) Rayko or Mark Kovnatskiy at Jewish cultural festivals throughout Europe. At Witwatersrand University in Johannesburg, South Africa in 2013 he premiered Jeanne Zaidel-Rudolph's "Hebrotica" for solo marimba, a work dedicated to him. He has premiered Danse la princesse Dunya, a work for solo marimba by French composer Serge Bach in 2020, and commissioned and premiered Alan Bern's solo marimba work Gedanken (2021).

== Books ==
- Ein Klassischer Klezmer: Reisegeschichten eines jüdischen Musikers in German, his autobiographical book was published by Tree of Life Productions in Munich, in 1998, 2000, 2016 and 2020.
- Die Neue Görlitzer Synagoge in German, about the history and architecture of the synagogue in Görlitz, (Germany) was published in July, 2021 by Verlag Hentrich & Hentrich Berlin, ISBN 978-3-95565-463-4.
- The New Synagogue in Görlitz in English, about the history and architecture of the synagogue in Görlitz, (Germany) was published in December, 2021 by Verlag Hentrich & Hentrich Berlin, ISBN 978-3-95565-507-5.
- Orte für die Seele im Heiligen Land: Prominente und ihre Lieblingsplätze. (Places for the Soul in the Holy Land: Prominent People and their Favorite Spaces), article about the Old City of Jerusalem's Jewish Quarter, in German, St. Benno Verlag GmbH, Erfurt, November 2022, ISBN 978-3-7462-6251-2.
- Clara Hepner: Eine Lesebuch in German; selections from the writings of German-Jewish author Clara Hepner, a short biography, an exhaustive index of her works, and an evaluation by Gabriele von Glasenapp. Published by Hentrich & Hentrich Berlin and Leipzig, in April, 2023. ISBN 978-3-95565-543-3 (Edited and annotated by Alex Jacobowitz)
- 100+ Synagogen in Deutschland in German, about 147 synagogues in Germany. 896 pages, hardcover. Published by Hentrich & Hentrich Berlin and Leipzig, in June 2025. ISBN 978-3-95565-639-3.

== Awards ==
He is the recipient of a Meet the Composer award. His Art of Xylos CD was released in 2002 by Sony-BMG under the Arte Nova label, and was nominated for the Echo Prize under the crossover category. He won competitions in Montreal (1981), Lucerne (1994), Ludwigsburg (2004) and Osnabrück (2007). In 2015, 2018 and 2020 he was accepted to the Central Council of Jews in Germany's (Zentralrat der Juden in Deutschlands) Artist Roster, which provides German government funding for his concerts in Jewish communities there; in August 2017 he was featured in their newspaper, the Jüdische Allgemeine. In 2019 he was declared a National Artist in Israel.

== Recordings ==
- ¡Marimba! - Bach, Beethoven, Couperin. Analogue. (1986)
- Aria - Classical works by Bach, Beethoven, Mozart, Scarlatti, Albéniz, Tárrega. Digital. (1995)
- The Art of Touching Wood - the music of J.S. Bach. Digital. (1996)
- Spanish Rosewood - the music of Spain: D. Scarlatti, Granados, Tárrega, Albéniz, etc. Digital (1997)
- Etz Chaim (Tree of Life) - Jewish traditional: Synagogue music, Yiddish and Israeli songs, klezmer. Digital (1998)
- The Art of Xylos - de Falla, J.S. Bach, Tárrega, Mussorgsky, Schumann, Beethoven, Mozart, Satie, etc. Surround (2002) BMG Entertainment
- Fantasy - the music of J.S. Bach. Surround (2006)
- Shvartse Chasene - Bear Family Records (2009)
- Feast of Xylophory - Albéniz, Beethoven, Couperin, Klezmer, Mozart, Satie, Fissinger, Wilder, etc. (2014)
- Hoffman’s Doina - with Brave Old World, Laurel Records. (2019)
- Vexations - music of Erik Satie, Laurel Records, (2020)

== Film appearances ==
- Heavenly Sounds (צלילים לאלהים) - Dir. Idit Gideoni, Channel 2, 1991, Israel
- Spielmänner - Bayerischer Rundfunk, 1995, Germany
- Denk ich an Deutschland...: Ein Fremder. - Dir. Peter Lilienthal, 2001, Germany
- Magic Marimbas - Dir. Eveline Hempel, Mitteldeutscher Rundfunk, 2003, Germany
- Klezmer on Fish Street - Dir. Yale Strom, independent, 2004, USA
- Da Spielt die Musik - Dir. Benedikt Kuby, Bayerischer Rundfunk, 2005, Germany
- Auf jüdischem Parkett - Dir. Esther Slevogt & Arielle Artsztein, Zweites Deutsches Fernsehen, Germany, 2005
- Klezmer in Germany - Dir. Caroline Goldie & Krzysztof Zanussi, BBC, WDR, Czech TV. England & Germany, 2007
- Jewish Blues - Dir. Marian Marzynski, PBS, USA, 2011
- Married to the Marimba - Dir. Alan Rosenthal & Larry Price, independent, Israel, 2011
- Held der Strasse - Dir. Sigrid Faltin, Südwestrundfunk, German Television, July 2012
