= Stanisław Górny =

- Village
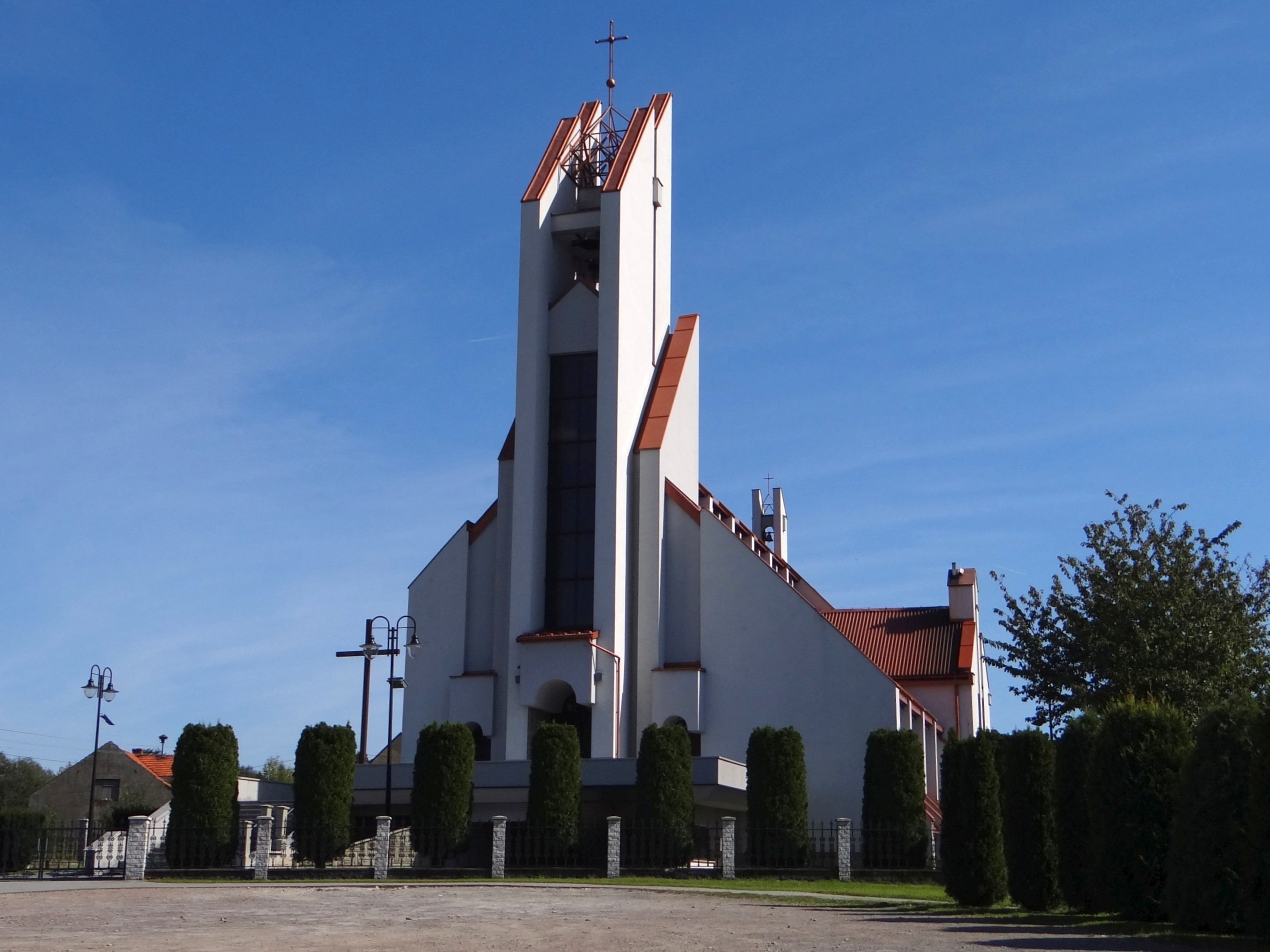
- Church of the Immaculate Heart of the Virgin Mary

- Location within Poland
- Coordinates: 49°55′N 19°38′E
- Country: Poland
- Voivodeship: Lesser Poland
- County: Wadowice
- Gmina: Wadowice

Population
  - Total: 1,017

Stanisław Górny [staˈniswaf ˈɡurnɨ] is a village in the administrative district of Gmina Wadowice, within Wadowice County, Lesser Poland Voivodeship, in southern Poland.
