= Gorzeń Dolny =

- Village
- Location within Poland
- Coordinates: 49°51′52″N 19°29′54″E
- Country: Poland
- Voivodeship: Lesser Poland
- County: Wadowice
- Gmina: Wadowice
- Highest elevation: 320 m (1,050 ft)
- Lowest elevation: 275 m (902 ft)
- Population: 458

Gorzeń Dolny [ˈɡɔʐɛɲ ˈdɔlnɨ] is a village in the administrative district of Gmina Wadowice, within Wadowice County, Lesser Poland Voivodeship, in southern Poland.

The village of Gorzeń was first mentioned in 1390 and was differentiated into two parts after the 16th century (since the 19th century known respectively as Gorzeń Dolny and Gorzeń Górny).
