= Chocznia =

- Village
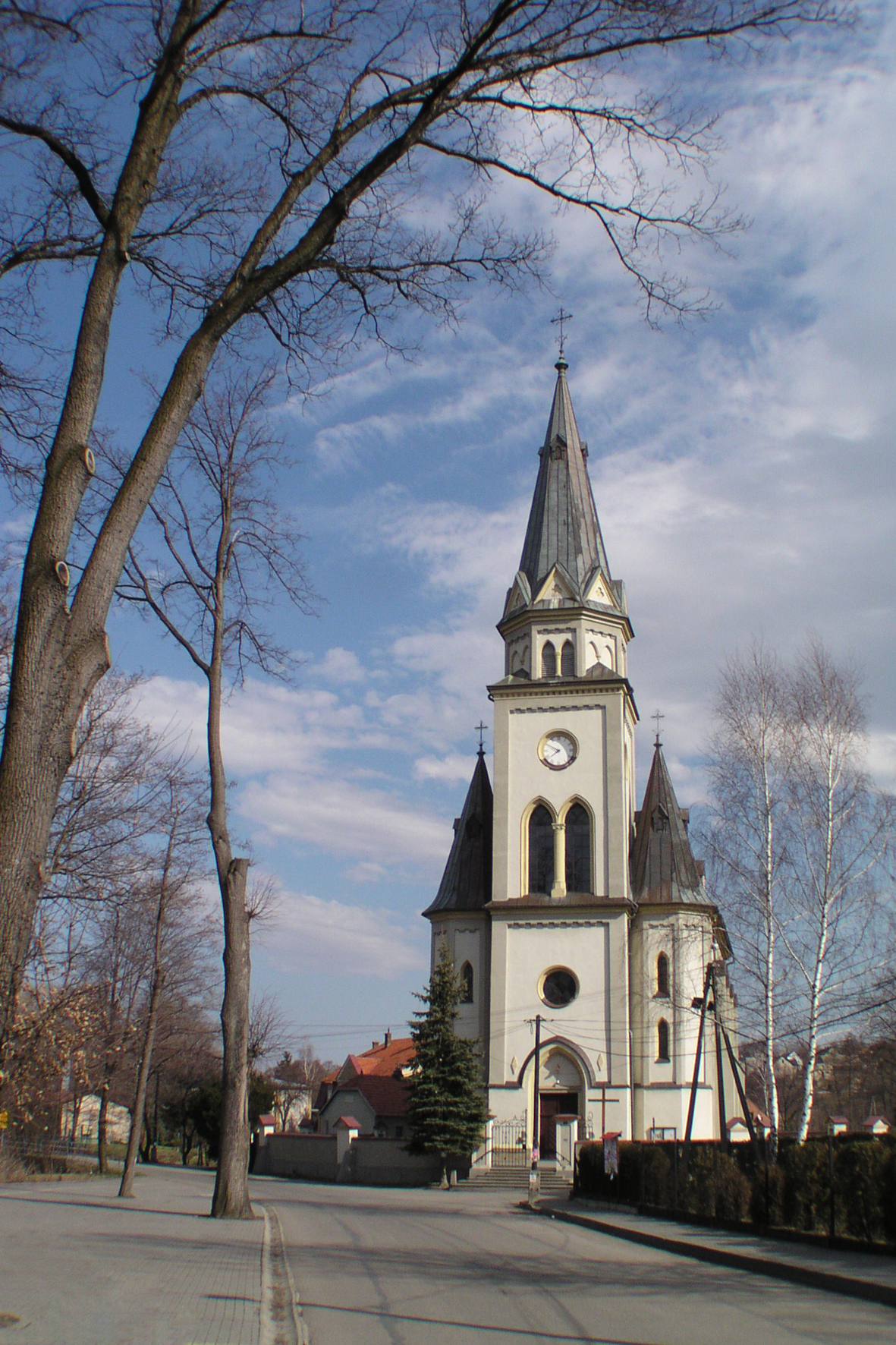
- Church of the Nativity of Saint John the Baptist

- Location within Poland
- Coordinates: 49°53′N 19°27′E
- Country: Poland
- Voivodeship: Lesser Poland
- County: Wadowice
- Gmina: Wadowice
- First mentioned: 1355

Population
  - Total: 5,510

Chocznia [ˈxɔt͡ʂɲa] is a village in the administrative district of Gmina Wadowice, within Wadowice County, Lesser Poland Voivodeship, in southern Poland.

The village was first mentioned in historical records in 1355. It lies approximately 2.5 kilometres northwest of Wadowice and developed as a residential settlement along a regional road linking Kraków and Bielsko‑Biała. As of 2021, Chocznia had a population of 5,635 inhabitants.
