= Edith Borroff =

American musicologist and composer (1925–2019)

Edith Borroff (August 2, 1925 – March 10, 2019) was an American musicologist and composer. Her compositions include over 60 commissioned works, including pieces for the stage; for her primary instrument—the organ; choral, vocal, and orchestral music; and several critical editions of works by previous composers such as Jubilate by J.-J. Cassanéa de Mondonville (Pittsburgh, 1961). She also wrote at least 7 books, including the textbook Music in Europe and the United States: a History (Englewood Cliffs, NJ, 1971/R), as well as various peer-reviewed articles and publications.

== Life and career ==
Borroff was born in New York City, the daughter of professional musicians Marie Bergerson and (Albert) Ramon Borroff, and sister of poet Marie Borroff. The family moved to Chicago in 1941. Borroff studied at the Oberlin Conservatory of Music and the American Conservatory of Music, graduating with a Bachelor of Music in 1946, a Master of Music in composition in 1948. Her education included studying organ with Claire Coci at Oberlin College and voice with Frances Grund.

She joined the faculty at Milwaukee-Downer College from 1950–54 while continuing her studies at the University of Michigan in Ann Arbor, graduating with a Ph.D. in historical musicology by 1958. Her dissertation was titled The instrumental works of Jean-Joseph Cassanéa de Mondonville.

In a 2011 interview with the American Composers Alliance, Borroff shared that she had always considered herself a composer. She started composing at a very young age. According to her, she was not allowed to pursue a degree in composition and settled for a degree in historical musicology but continued to compose and had over 60 commissions as a composer.

An extensive, yet selective, list of her works appears in the biographical article on Borroff in the Oxford Music Online/Grove Music dictionary accessible from most privatized university library databases.

After completing her studies, Borroff worked as a composer and music professor. She taught at Hillsdale College (where she also was associate dean) 1958–1962, University of Wisconsin-Milwaukee 1962–1966, Eastern Michigan University 1966–1972, and State University of New York at Binghamton, 1973 to 1992. Her Concerto for Marimba and Small Orchestra was premiered with that university's orchestra in 1981, with Alex Jacobowitz as marimba soloist and Paul Jordan as conductor.

Borroff retired from teaching in 1992. Her papers are housed at the Newberry Library. She died in Durham, North Carolina on March 10, 2019.

== Works ==
=== For the stage ===
- Spring over Brooklyn (musical), 1952
- Pygmalion (incid music, G.B. Shaw), S, chbr chorus, ww qnt, 2 perc, 1955
- La folle de chaillot (J. Giraudoux), S, perc, pf, 1960
- The Sun and the Wind
- a Musical Fable (op, 3 scenes, E. Borroff), 1977

=== For 4 or more instruments ===
- String Quartet, c. 1942
- Grande rondo, string quartet, c. 1943
- String Trio, 1944, rev. 1952
- Theme and Variations for violincello and piano, c. 1944
- Quintet, cl, str, 1945
- String Quartet no.3, e minor, 1945
- Minuet, string orchestra, 1946
- Woodwind Quintet, D major, c. 1947
- Woodwind Quintet, C major, 1948
- Vorspiel über das Thema ‘In dulci jubilo’, 2 flutes, 2 horns, piano, 1951
- Variations for Band, 1965
- Chance Encounter (Romp or Rehearsal?), string quartet, 1974
- Game Pieces, suite, woodwind quintet, 1980
- Mar Concerto, 1981
- Suite: 8 Canons for 6 Players, percussion, 1984
- Mottoes, suite, 8 saxophones, 1989
- 2 Pieces from the Old Rag Bag, sax quartet, 1989

=== For chorus and instruments ===
Selected works:

- The Christ-Child Lay on Mary's Lap (text G.K. Chesterton) for SSA choir (a cappella)
- Passacaglia for organ (1946)
- Sonata for horn and piano (1954)
- Voices in Exile, 3 Canons for flute and viola (1962)
- Five Pieces for viola and piano (1989)
- Trio for viola, horn and piano (1999)

=== Scholarly publications ===
- An Introduction to Elisabeth-Claude Jacquet de La Guerre (Brooklyn, NY, 1966)
- Music of the Baroque (Dubuque: W.C. Brown, 1970)
- Music in Europe and the United States: a History (Englewood Cliffs, NJ, 1971/R)
- ed.: Notations and Editions: a Book in Honor of Louise Cuyler (Dubuque, IA, 1974/R)
- with M. Irvin: Music in Perspective (New York, 1976)
- Three American composers (Lanham: University Press of America, 1986)
- American Operas: A Checklist (Warren, Mich.: Harmonie Park Press, 1992)
- Music Melting Round: a History of Music in the United States (New York: Ardsley House, 1995)
- William Grant Still (was cited as forthcoming per Regier)
