= Wysoka, Wadowice County =

Wysoka
- Village
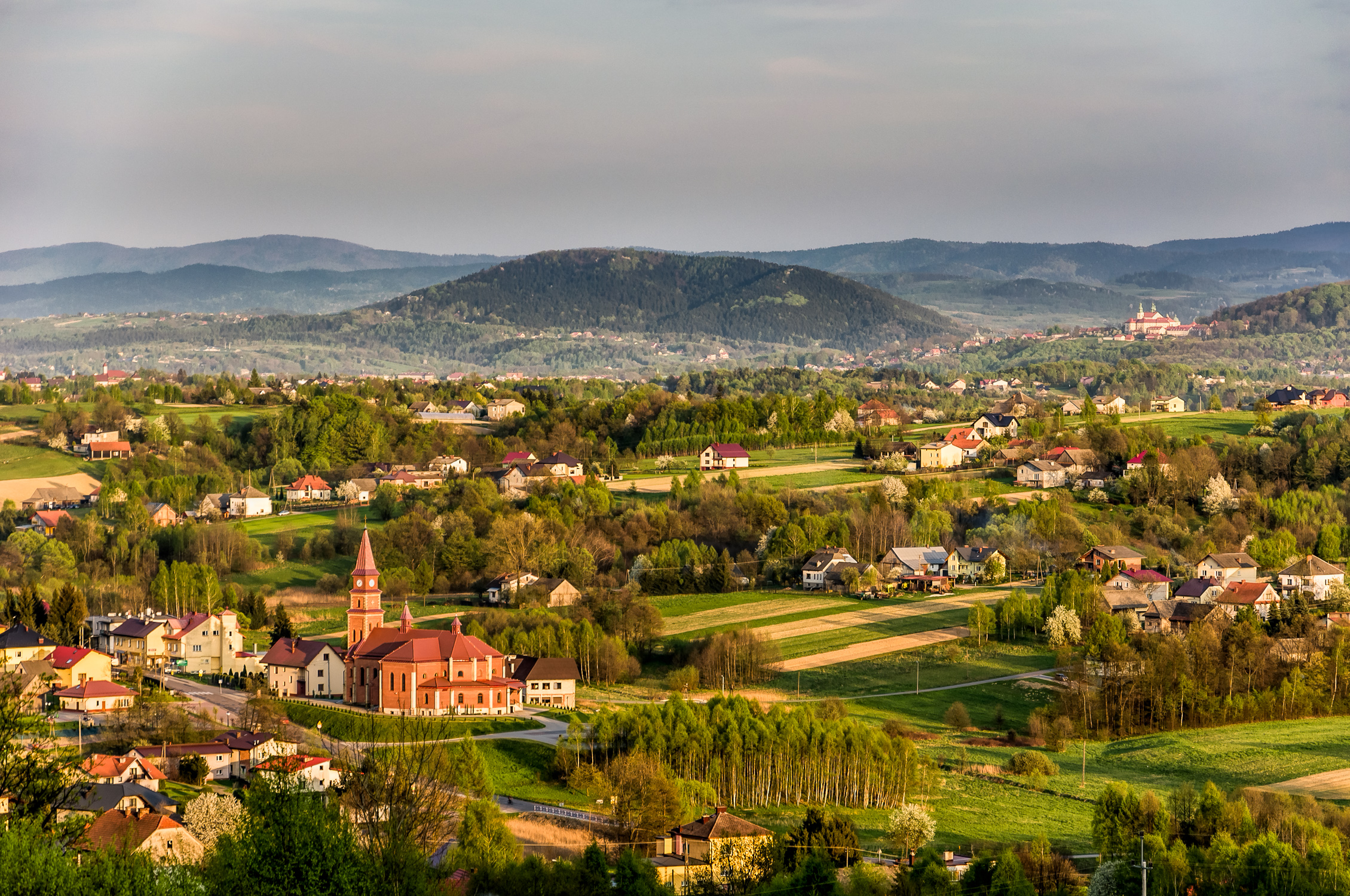

- Location within Poland
- Coordinates: 49°55′N 19°36′E
- Country: Poland
- Voivodeship: Lesser Poland
- County: Wadowice
- Gmina: Wadowice
- Highest elevation: 390 m (1,280 ft)
- Lowest elevation: 300 m (980 ft)
- Population: 1,833

Wysoka [vɨˈsɔka] is a village in the administrative district of Gmina Wadowice, within Wadowice County, Lesser Poland Voivodeship, in southern Poland.
