= Czartak =

Czartak (Polish pronunciation: [ˈtʂart̪ak]) was a regional literary group in Poland, founded after World War I by Emil Zegadłowicz. Its most famous member was Zofia Kossak-Szczucka. Other members included Edward Kozikowski, Jan Nepomucen Miller and Janina Brzostowska.

Czartak's program may be described as a mystical naiveté that joined a love of nature with a disgust for modern civilization. Czartak's writers were fascinated by expressionism.
