= Ponikiew-Chobot =

- Village
- Location within Poland
- Coordinates: 49°50′24″N 19°30′38″E
- Country: Poland
- Voivodeship: Lesser Poland
- County: Wadowice
- Gmina: Wadowice
- Population: 286

Ponikiew-Chobot [pɔˈnikʲɛf ˈxɔbɔt] is a village in the administrative district of Gmina Wadowice, within Wadowice County, Lesser Poland Voivodeship, in southern Poland.
