= Marie Borroff =

American poet (1923–2019)

- Born: September 10, 1923; New York City, U.S.
- Died: July 5, 2019 (aged 95); Branford, Connecticut, U.S.
- Occupations: Poet; translator; professor
- Title: Sterling Professor of English
- Relatives: Edith Borroff (sister)

Academic background
- Education: University of Chicago (B.A., M.A.); Yale University (Ph.D.)

Marie Edith Borroff (September 10, 1923 – July 5, 2019) was an American poet, translator, and the Sterling Professor of English emerita at Yale University.

== Life ==
Borroff was born in New York City in 1923, the daughter of professional musicians Marie Bergerson and (Albert) Ramon Borroff, and sister of composer Edith Borroff. She graduated from the University of Chicago with a BA and MA in 1946, and from Yale University with a Ph.D. in 1956. In 1959, she became the first woman to teach in the English Department at Yale. In 1965, she was the first woman appointed to be an English professor. She retired in 1994.

An Endowed Chair at Yale has been named for her (Marie Borroff Professor of English), presently held by Ardis Butterfield.

== Works ==
- Sir Gawain and the Green Knight: A Stylistic and Metrical Study. Yale University Press. 1963.
- Marie Borroff, ed. (1963). Wallace Stevens; a collection of critical essays. Prentice-Hall.
- Sir Gawain and the Green Knight: a new verse translation. Translated by Marie Borroff. Norton. 1967.
- Pearl: a new verse translation. Translated by Marie Borroff. W. W. Norton. 1977. ISBN 978-0-393-09144-1.
- Language and the Poet. University of Chicago Press. 1979. ISBN 978-0-226-06651-6.
- Marie Borroff; Mary Teresa Tavormina; Robert F. Yeager, eds. (1995). The Endless Knot: Essays on Old and Middle English in Honor of Marie Borroff. D.S. Brewer. ISBN 978-0-85991-480-2.
- Sir Gawain and the Green Knight: Patience; and Pearl: verse translations. Translated by Marie Borroff. W.W. Norton. 2001. ISBN 978-0-393-97658-8.
- Stars and Other Signs. Yale University Press. 2002. ISBN 978-0-300-09570-8.
- Traditions and Renewals: Chaucer, the Gawain-Poet, and Beyond. Yale University Press. 2003. ISBN 978-0-300-09612-5.
- Albert Gelpi, ed. (1993). "From "Recent Poetry"". Denise Levertov: selected criticism. University of Michigan Press. ISBN 978-0-472-06416-8.
