= Georg Muschner (author) =

German playwright, poet, and author

Georg Muschner (October 25, 1875 – September 17, 1915) also known by the pseudonym Muschner-Niedenführ) was a German playwright, poet, author and editor, active at the beginning of the 20th century.

== Biography ==
Born in then Prussian Reichenbach, he moved to Munich around 1904. In addition to his substantial writings for artistic periodicals, he also edited important magazines, bringing himself into creative contact with influential writers of the time, including Erich Mühsam, Richard Dehmel (1903), Friedrich Lienhard, Hans Böttcher, (aka Joachim Ringelnatz), Munich playwright Frank Wedekind and many others. In 1910, along with Theodore Etzel, he founded Die Lese, a literary magazine published yearly in Munich, which purported to bring the reader the best that German literature had to offer each year. For a time, he was sole editor at Die Lese.

Muschner was also a lieutenant in the Prussian Army. When he was called up to active service during the First World War, Etzel took over editing responsibilities. Muschner fell in battle in Galicia on the eastern front, on September 17, 1915.

He never married, but had a ten-year relationship with German-Jewish writer Clara Hepner while living in Munich, and published her works in Die Lese. After his death, she furthered the posthumous publication of Muschner's works.

== Works ==
- Frau Eva: das Buch unsrer Liebe (Leipzig, 1901)
- Beitrag zu einer Geschichte der neueren Literatur, by Cäsar Flaischen (editor Muschner, 7 editions, 1903)
- Das Riesengebirge. Ein Hand- und Reisebuch. (Berlin Schall, 9 editions, 1904)
- Betrachtungen über Kunst (1906)
- Ernst Liebermann - München (1906)
- Das Hamburger Bismarck-Denkmal (1906)
- Persönlichkeits-Kunst (1906–7)
- Fritz Erlers Wiesbadener Fresken (1907–1908)
- Schloss Rehnitz in der Mark (1909)
- Zehn Gebote für Brautpaare (1909, and republished posthumously in 1917)
- Aquarien und Terrarien für Kinderzimmer (1909)
- Der Landstreicher: und andere Erzählungen by Carl Hauptmann, W. Bühler, M. Körner (editor Muschner, 2 editions, 1910 & 1912)
- Über die Brücke (poetry collection, 3 editions, 1911)
- Das Glücksschiff: Geschichten vom Rhein by Wilhelm August Schmidtbonn, (editor Muschner, 2 editions, 1912–1913)
- Und bin ich einmal verschollen... (posthumously published poetry, 1919).
