= Zawadka, Wadowice County =

Zawadka
- Village
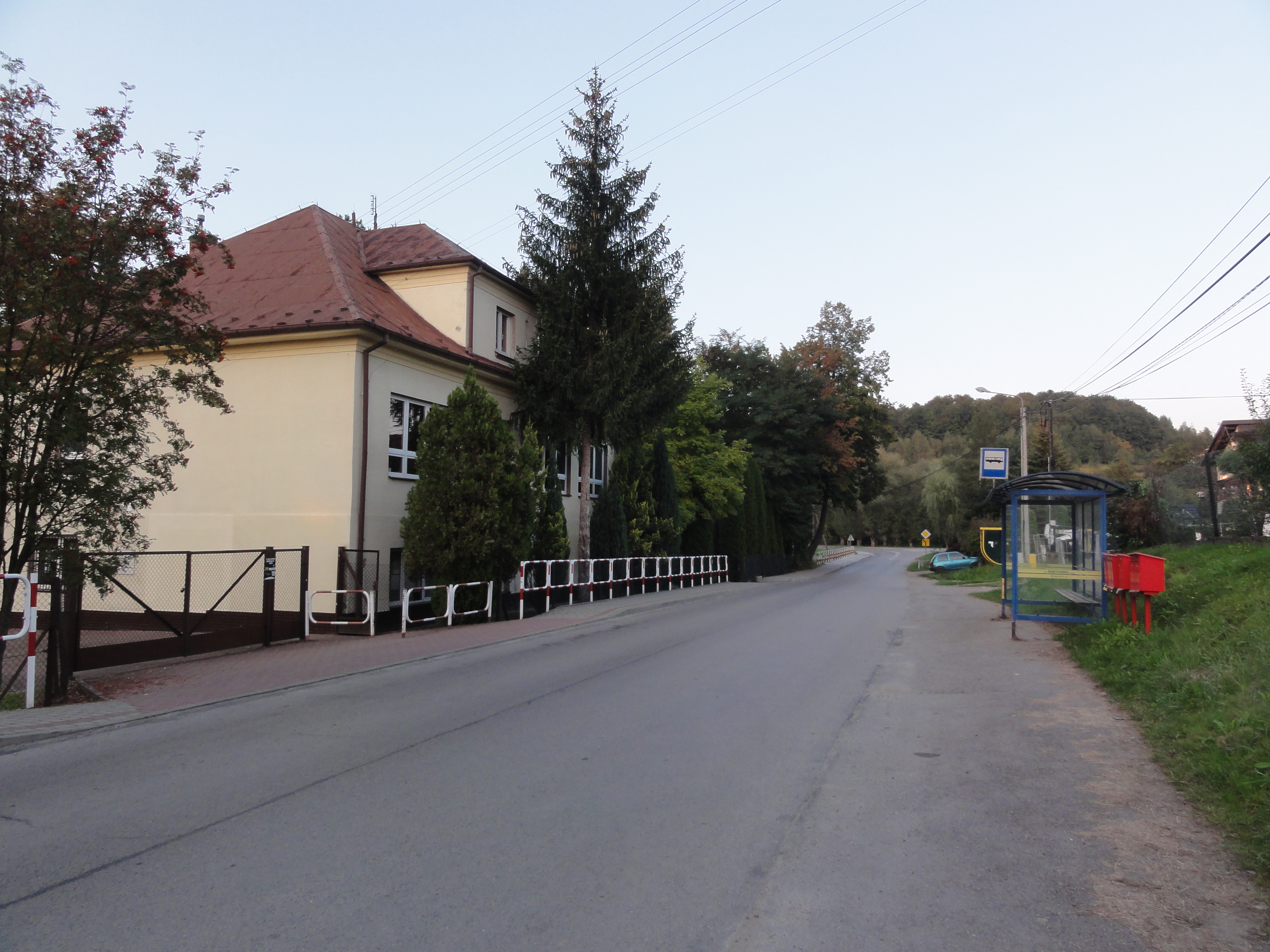

- Location within Poland
- Coordinates: 49°51′8″N 19°28′3″E
- Country: Poland
- Voivodeship: Lesser Poland
- County: Wadowice
- Gmina: Wadowice
- Highest elevation: 350 m (1,150 ft)
- Lowest elevation: 300 m (980 ft)
- Population: 748

Zawadka [zaˈvatka] is a village in the administrative district of Gmina Wadowice, within Wadowice County, Lesser Poland Voivodeship, in southern Poland.
