= Kaczyna =

- Village
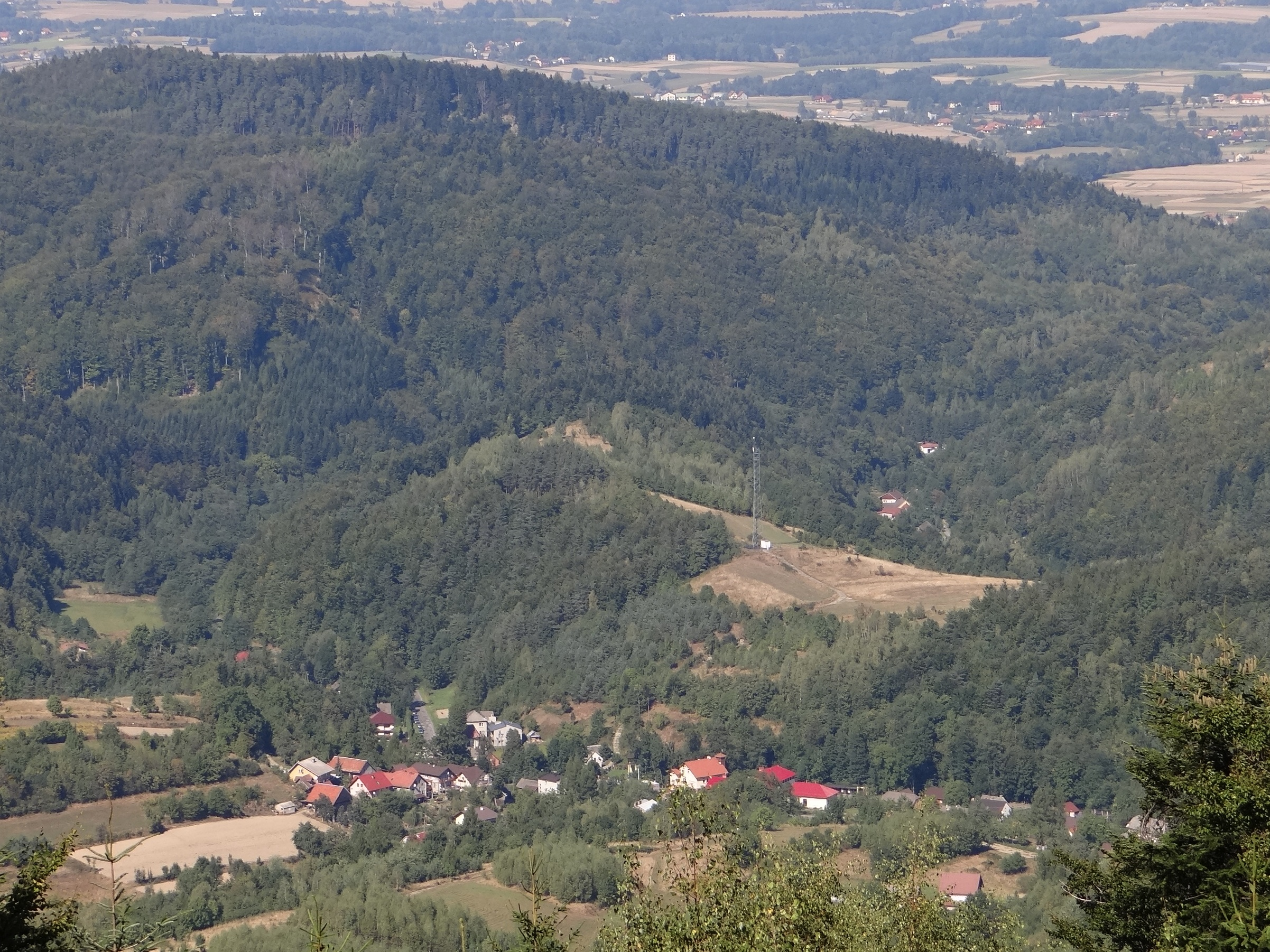

- Location within Poland
- Coordinates: 49°50′N 19°26′E
- Country: Poland
- Voivodeship: Lesser Poland
- County: Wadowice
- Gmina: Wadowice
- Population: 366

Kaczyna [kaˈt͡ʂɨna] is a village in the administrative district of Gmina Wadowice, within Wadowice County, Lesser Poland Voivodeship, in southern Poland.
