= Gorzeń Górny =

- Village
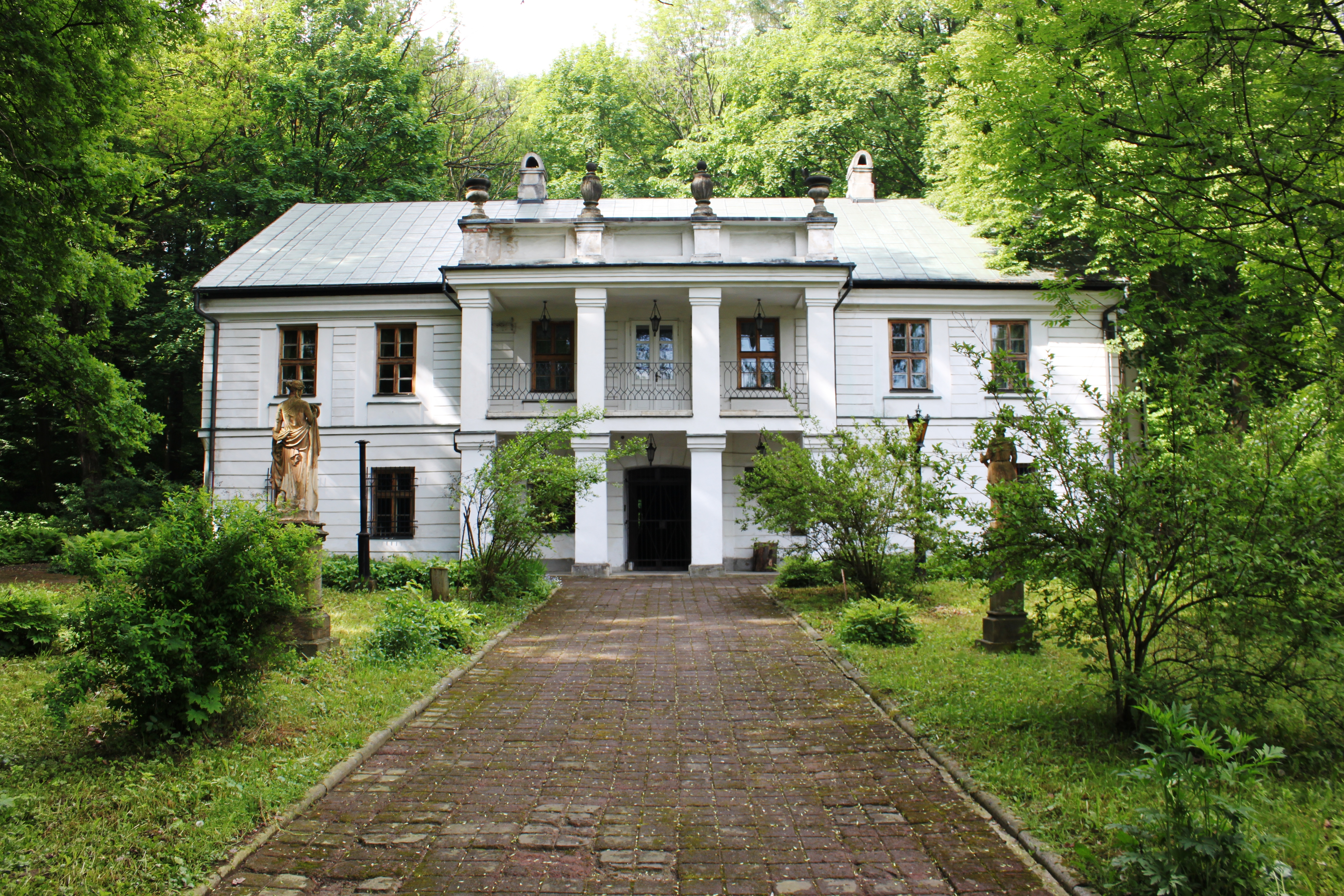
- Manor house in Gorzeń Górny

- Location within Poland
- Coordinates: 49°51′21″N 19°29′55″E
- Country: Poland
- Voivodeship: Lesser Poland
- County: Wadowice
- Gmina: Wadowice
- Highest elevation: 320 m (1,050 ft)
- Lowest elevation: 275 m (902 ft)
- Population: 277

Gorzeń Górny [ˈɡɔʐɛɲ ˈɡurnɨ] is a village in the administrative district of Gmina Wadowice, within Wadowice County, Lesser Poland Voivodeship, in southern Poland.

The village of Gorzeń was first mentioned in 1390 and was differentiated into two parts after the 16th century. Since the 19th century they were known respectively as Gorzeń Dolny and Gorzeń Górny.

There is a manor house from the late 18th century, where Emil Zegadłowicz used to live and work.
