= Clara Hepner =

German-Jewish writer

Clara Hepner (December 9, 1860 – August 11, 1939) also known by the pseudonym Klara Hepner, or Clara Muschner, Klara Muschner, sometimes Clara Hepner-Muschner, born Clara Freund in Görlitz, in Lower Silesia, Germany. She is best known as a poet and author of children's stories.

== Personal life and family ==
She was the eldest of the six children of Dorothea (Sarah, known as Doris) Freund (1832–1915) and Rabbi Dr. Siegfried Freund (1829–1915), who was the main rabbi of the Jewish community in Görlitz, Germany from 1853 to 1909 - over 50 years.

In 1881 she married Salo (Salomon) Hepner, with whom she lived in Görlitz for a number of years before they moved to Berlin. Shortly before their divorce in October, 1903, she moved to Munich, where she struggled to create an existence as a writer.

Around that time she began a relationship with Georg Muschner (1875–1915), who was also living in the Nymphenburg area of Munich. He was simultaneously an Austrian playwright, poet, editor, and an Austrian Army lieutenant. He died in September 1915 while fighting at Jaroszowice on the Eastern Front during the First World War. They had not married, but she added his name to her own for a few years after his death (several sources wrongly give Hepner as being her maiden name) before returning to using only her own (married) name. Both her parents died at the end of that same year.

== Career as a writer ==
Clara Hepner discovered a talent for writing late in life, publishing her first book in 1906 (Sonnenscheinchens Erste Reise, The Little Sunbeam's First Journey) at age 46, still under the German Empire. Her manuscript translation of Gaspard de la Nuit from French to German had been rejected for publication by the Insel-Verlag in Leipzig the year before, in 1905. She wrote some poems that were set to music around 1910, but primarily she earned a reputation for herself as a German author of children's stories during the Weimar Republic. Her stories were illustrated by famous artists of the day, like József Divéky, Lore Friedrich-Gronau, Josef Mauder, Ernst Liebermann, Ernst Kutzer, Anna Löffler-Winkler, Else Wenz-Viëtor, Fritz Lang, Otto Ubbelohde, Willy Planck, Hugo Wilkens among others.

After the Nazis rose to power in January 1933, her main publishing house (Franckh'sche Verlagshandlung in Stuttgart) at first was allowed to continue printing her books but came under increasing pressure to fire Jewish and "politically suspect" authors. Forced to abandon her apartment in Munich under the anti-Jewish laws of the Nazi government, she committed suicide in Munich on August 11, 1939, at age 78, and was buried in the New Jewish Cemetery there.

== Writings ==
- Die Geschichte vom Kuckuck in Pussi Mau, Schaffstein, Cologne (ca. 1904)
- Der Tod published in Jugend, Vol. 28 (1905)
- Sonnenscheinchens Erste Reise (1906), 2nd Edition Scholz, Mainz (1925)
- Eine unappetitliche Geschichte published in Jugend, Vol. 42 (1908)
- Neue Märchen: Mit Bildern von Josef Mauder. Verlag der Jugendblätter (Carl Schnell), Munich (1908, 1909)
- Der Himmelswagen - A Comedy for Small and Large People in Four Acts (1908)
- Hundert Neue Tiergeschichten (1910)
- Der Erdgucker (1911)
- Der Tod published in Kinderland : Blätter für ethische Jugenderziehung (1911)
- Warum das Meerwasser salzig ist : nach einer norwegischen Volkssage in Kinderland (1912)
- Vom tapferen Eichhörnschen in Kinderland (1912)
- Mensch und Tier in Kinderland (1913)
- Die Hygiene der jungen Mädchen published in Kinderland : Blätter für ethische Jugenderziehung (1913)
- Eine Mutter, published in Kinderland: Blätter für ethische Jugenderziehung; (1914)
- Die beiden Lokomotiven (1914)
- Indische Fabeln : Bodhisattva dem Weisen nacherzählt with illustrations of von Diveky (1914)
- Seine letzte Nuß - Neue Tiergeschichten, K.Thienemanns Verlag (~1915 & reprint 1926)
- L. I, published in Kinderland : Blätter für ethische Jugenderziehung; (1915)
- Die Freunde published in Kinderland : Blätter für ethische Jugenderziehung; (1915)
- Feldgraue Tiergeschichten in Kinderland (1916)
- Ungeladene Erntegäste in Kinderland (1917)
- Sonnenscheinchens erste Reise: Märchen u. Erzählungen f. Klein u. Groß. Schall & Rentel, 1920.
- Eine Arbeiterin and Im Rachen des Todes in Deutsches Mädchenbuch, Vol. 27, Thienemanns Verlag, Stuttgart (ca. 1920)
- Auf der Kuckuckswiese (1921)
- Märchen-Almanach: N. F., Vol. 1 (1922)
- Der Meister und seine Schüler (1922)
- Arachne und andere Tiergeschichten (1922)
- Lux, der Leithund und andere Tiergeschichten: Mit 4 farbigen und vielen schwarzen Holzschnitten von Fritz Lang, K. Thienemann, Stuttgart (1922 & Reprint 1946)
- Hundert Neue Tiergeschichten 8th edition, Franckh'sche Verlag, Stuttgart (approximately 1922)
- Mariannes Abenteuer mit dem Küchenvölkchen, erz. f. Mädels, die kochen wollen (1922)
- Was der Storch in Afrika erlebte. Märchen aus Feld, Wald und Heide nach Karl Ewald. Illustrations by Willy Planck. Franckh'sche Verlagshandlung, Stuttgart (1923).
- Der Mann von Geburt und die Frau aus dem Volke: Ein Roman aus d. Leben/Marie Sophie Schwartz, edited by Clara Hepner. Heimat u. Welt-Verlag Dieck & Co., Stuttgart (1923)
- Der Meisterfänger (1925)
- Die drei Schlüffelein (1925)
- Woher die gelben Blumen kommen (1925)
- Was Tiere erleben, Verlagsanstalt Tyrolia, Innsbruck (1925)
- Gulnar die Meerfrau und andere Märchen
- Das Wichtl und andere Märchen aus der Zeit nach Grimm (1927)
- Lustige und traurige Geschichten aus dem Leben eines Huhnes (O. Bowen, Hennchen Gakelei) - Translation from English, 1927
- Bei den Kranken in Unser Heim in der Sonne, editor Maria Domanig, Verlagsanstalt Tyrolia A.G., Innsbruck
- Tiergeschichten für Kinder, drei Erzählungen von Klara Hepner (1929)
- Warum grad der Hase die Ostereier bringt, Vom furchtsamen Hasen, Wackelohr in Neue Märchen/Erzählungen/Gedichte, from Das neue Frida Schanz Buch, editor W.G. Schreckenbach, Verlag Löwensohn, Fürth, 1929
- Rudi, Rosel und Reiß, der Hund Abenteuerliche Ferienerlebnisse (1932)
- Der bestrafte Spatz und viele andere Tiergeschichten, Franckh'sche Verlag / Kosmos, Stuttgart (1935)
- Sonnenscheinchens Erste Reise, (reprint) Scholz, Mainz (1937)
