= Jan Świerc =

Polish Catholic priest (1877–1941)

Blessed Jan Świerc SDB
- Church: Catholic Church

Orders
- Ordination: 6 June 1903 by Agostino Richelmy

Personal details
- Born: 29 April 1877 Königshütte, German Empire (now in Poland)
- Died: 27 June 1941 (aged 64) Auschwitz-Birkenau, German-occupied Poland

Sainthood
- Beatified: 6 June 2026; Kraków, Poland by Cardinal Marcello Semeraro

Jan Świerc (29 April 1877 – 27 June 1941) was a Polish Catholic priest who was affiliated with the Salesians of Don Bosco. He was the parish priest for Przemyśl-Zasanie and St. Stanislaus Kostka Parish in Kraków before being murdered at the Auschwitz concentration camp. His beatification process started in 2003, and he was recognised as a martyr in 2025; he was beatified in Kraków in 2026.

== Early life and education ==
Jan Świerc was born in Königshütte, German Empire, on 29 April 1877, to Matthew and Francesca Rother. He conducted secondary studies in Italy due to support from the Salesians of Don Bosco and graduated in Turin in 1897. He became a Salesian and he conducted his novitiate in Ivrea. He studied philosophy and theology in Turin.

== Career ==
On 6 June 1903, Świerc was ordained as a priest by Cardinal Agostino Richelmy in Turin. He returned home in 1903, and became the first rector in Oświęcim. In 1911, he was appointed as the head of the Lubomirski Institute in Kraków. He provided care for wounded Austria-Hungary soldiers during World War I. He was director and parish priest in Przemyśl-Zasanie from 1925 to 1934, and oversaw the construction of St. Joseph's Church. He was a close advisor to Bishop Anatol Nowak. On 8 July 1938, he became the director and parish priest for the St. Stanislaus Kostka Parish in Cracow. Karol Wojtyła, the future Pope John Paul II, was a member of this parish church.

The Gestapo arrested Świerc on 23 May 1941, and imprisoned him in Montelupi Prison before being sent to the Auschwitz concentration camp on 26 June. On 27 June, he was tortured and murdered by a kapo known as Bloody Franz. The church in the area was forced into clandestine activities following the murder of its priests and recruited men such as Jan Tyranowski to serve as lay leaders.

== Legacy ==
The process for Świerc's beatification started on 17 September 2003, and was completed at the diocesan level on 24 May 2011. A decree recognising the martyrdom of Świerc and eight other Polish priests murdered at Auschwitz and Dachau was presented by Cardinal Marcello Semeraro and approved by Pope Leo XIV on 24 October 2025. He was beatified on 6 June 2026 by Marcello Semeraro, prefect of the Dicastery for the Causes of Saints, at a ceremony held in Kraków.

== Works cited ==
=== Books ===
- Bernstein, Carl; Politi, Marco (1997). His Holiness: John Paul II and the History of Our Time. Penguin Books. ISBN 0140266917.
- Weigel, George (1999). Witness to Hope: The Biography of Pope John Paul II. Cliff Street Books. ISBN 006018793X.

=== News ===
- "Poland – Fr Jan Świerc and his eight companions, Polish Salesian martyrs, have been proclaimed Blessed". Agenzia Info Salesiana. 8 June 2026.
- Campisi, Tiziana (24 October 2025). "Pope approves beatification for priests martyred under Nazism and Communism". Vatican News. Archived from the original on 14 November 2025.
- Wysocka, Sylwia (25 October 2025). "Papież zatwierdził dekret ws. męczeństwa polskich salezjanów zamordowanych w Auschwitz i Dachau". Ministry of Culture and National Heritage. Archived from the original on 14 November 2025.

=== Web ===
- "Jan Swierc and 8 companions". Salesians of Don Bosco. Archived from the original on 14 November 2025.
- "Jan Świerc e 8 Compagni". Dicastery for the Causes of Saints. Archived from the original on 14 November 2025.
- "Ks. Jan Świerc SDB". Salesians of Don Bosco. Archived from the original on 14 November 2025.
- "Sługa Boży ks. Jan Świerc". Salesian Sisters of Don Bosco. Archived from the original on 14 November 2025.
- "Świerc Jan (1877-1941)". Upper Silesian Pantheon in Katowice. Archived from the original on 14 November 2025.
