= Ardis Butterfield =

Music and literature scholar

Academic background
- Education: Trinity College, Cambridge; University of Bristol

Academic work
- Discipline: Musicology
- Institutions: Yale University

Ardis Butterfield is a scholar of medieval music and literature. She is the Marie Borroff Professor of English, and Professor of Music and French at Yale University United States.

== Education ==
Butterfield read English at Trinity College, Cambridge, followed by a master's degree in medieval literature at the University of Bristol, both in England, after which she returned to Trinity College to complete a PhD. Her PhD was entitled 'Interpolated lyric in medieval narrative poetry' (1988).

== Career ==
Butterfield was a lecturer and then Professor of English at University College London. In 2009, Butterfield co-founded the Medieval Song Network, a research group, in London, England, UK.

In 2012, Butterfield became a professor of English at Yale University. In 2018, Butterfield became a senior research fellow at University of Cambridge. In 2018, Butterfield had been appointed as the Marie Borroff Professor of English at Yale University. Butterfield is leading a team to develop a Digital Archive of Medieval Song.

== Awards ==
- R.H. Gapper Prize

== Bibliography ==
- The Familiar Enemy: Chaucer, Language and the Nation in the Hundred Years War (Oxford University Press, 2009)
- Poetry and Music in Medieval France (Cambridge University Press, 2003)
- ed. Chaucer and the City
