= Klecza Dolna =

- Village
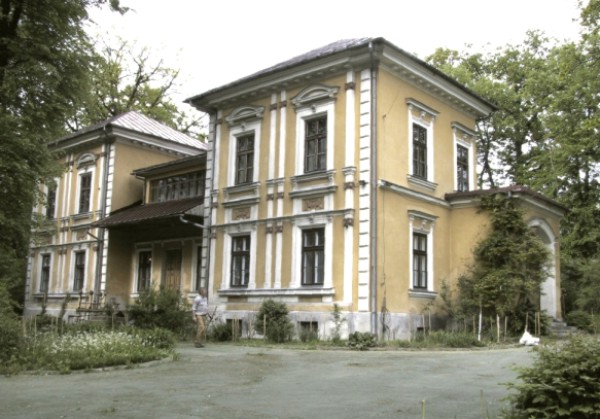
- Manor

- Location within Poland
- Coordinates: 49°52′15″N 19°32′54″E
- Country: Poland
- Voivodeship: Lesser Poland
- County: Wadowice
- Gmina: Wadowice
- Population: 2,188

Klecza Dolna [ˈklɛt͡ʂa ˈdɔlna] is a village in the administrative district of Gmina Wadowice, within Wadowice County, Lesser Poland Voivodeship, in southern Poland.
