= Jaroszowice =

- Village
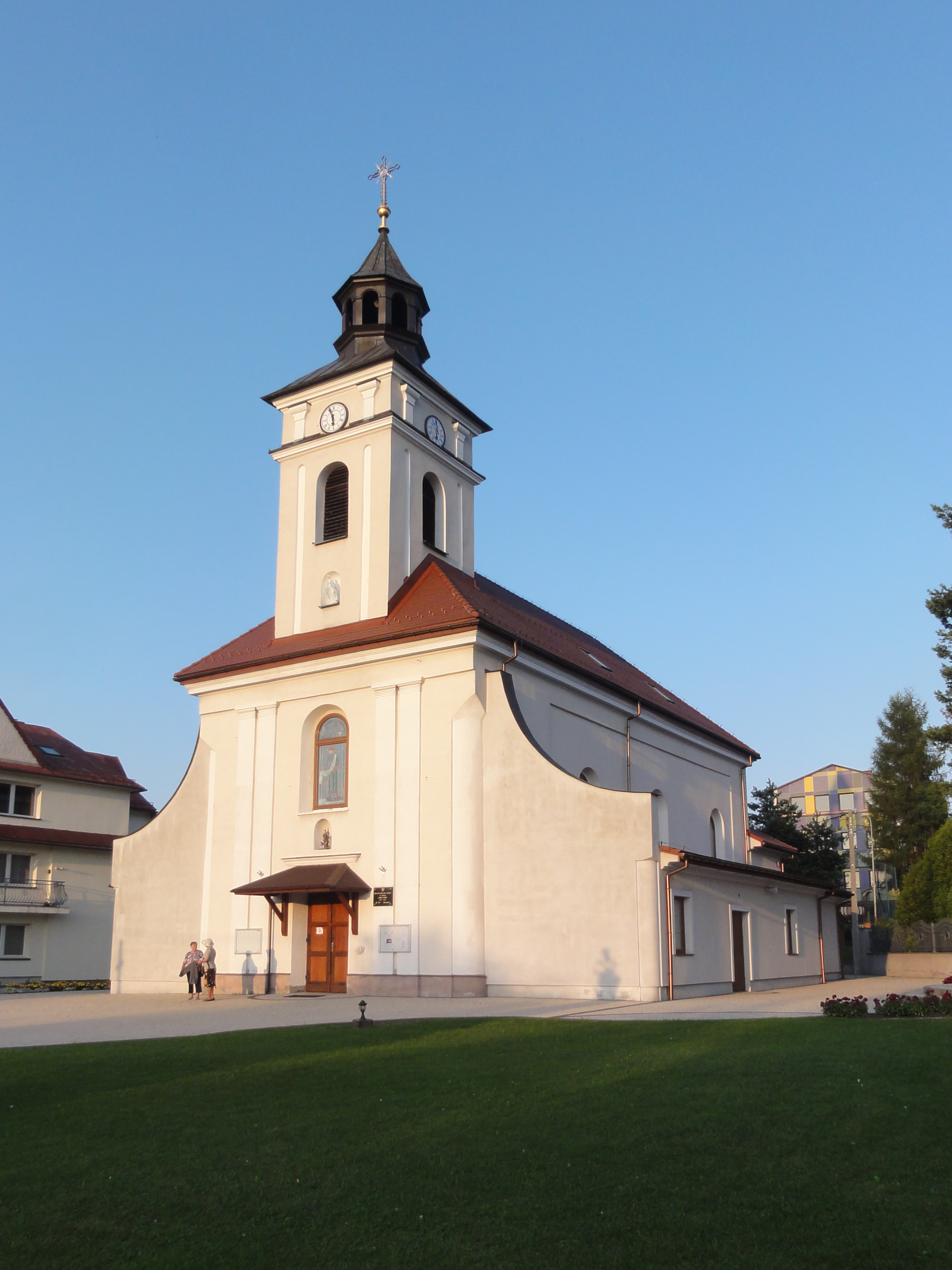
- Church of Saint Isidore

- Location within Poland
- Coordinates: 49°52′N 19°32′E
- Country: Poland
- Voivodeship: Lesser Poland
- County: Wadowice
- Gmina: Wadowice

Population
  - Total: 1,700

Jaroszowice [jarɔʂɔˈvit͡sɛ] is a village in the administrative district of Gmina Wadowice, within Wadowice County, Lesser Poland Voivodeship in southern Poland.
