= Babica, Lesser Poland Voivodeship =

Babica
- Village
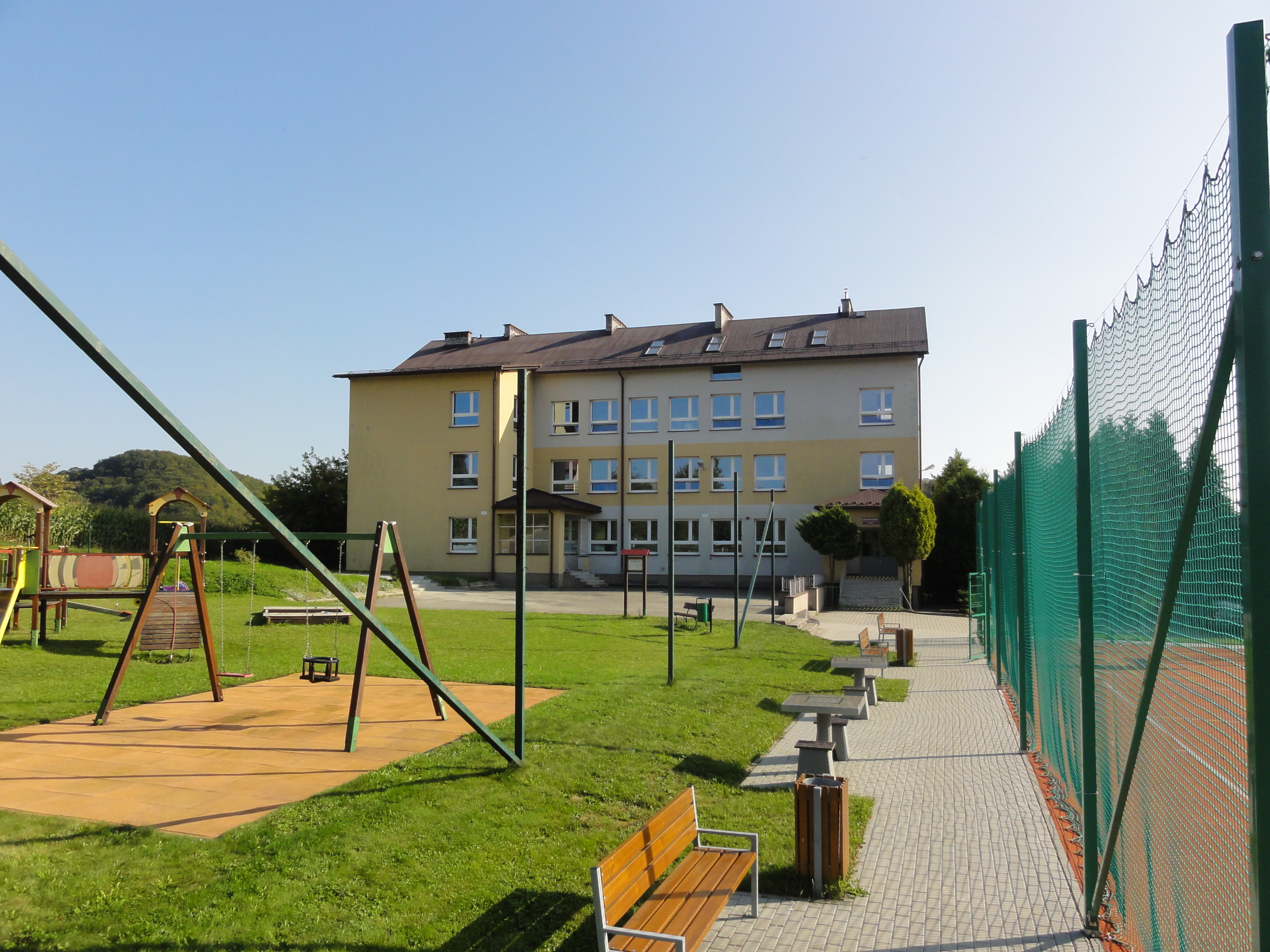
- Elementary school

- Location within Poland
- Coordinates: 49°54′18″N 19°32′51″E
- Country: Poland
- Voivodeship: Lesser Poland
- County: Wadowice
- Gmina: Wadowice
- Highest elevation: 320 m (1,050 ft)
- Lowest elevation: 280 m (920 ft)
- Population: 840

Babica [baˈbit͡sa] is a village in the administrative district of Gmina Wadowice, within Wadowice County, Lesser Poland Voivodeship, in southern Poland.
