= Elements of music =

Ingredients that form music

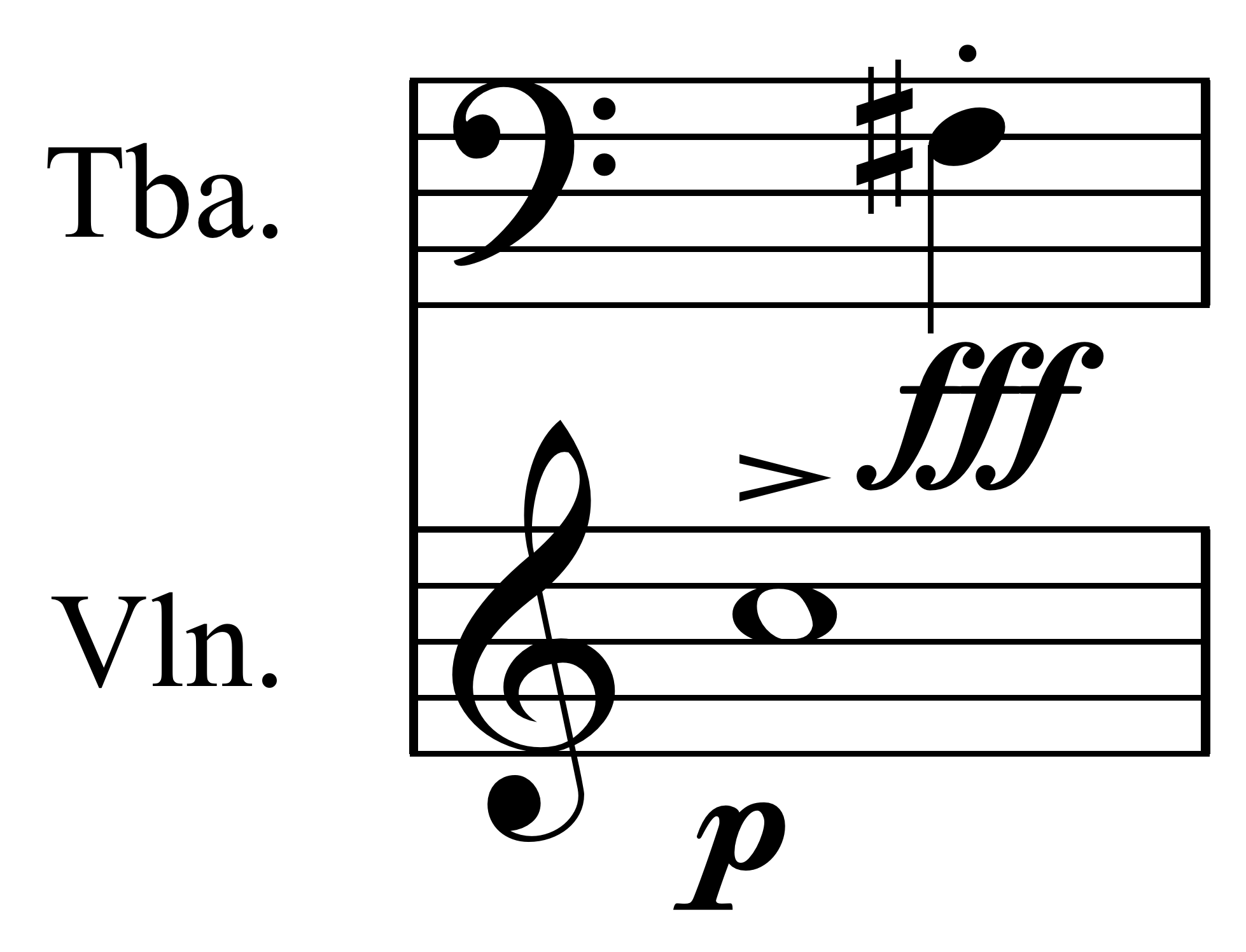
Notation indicating differing pitch, dynamics, articulation, and instrumentation

Music can be analysed by considering a variety of its elements, or parts (aspects, characteristics, features), individually or together. A commonly used list of the main elements includes pitch, timbre, texture, volume, duration, and form. The elements of music may be compared to the elements of art or design.

== Selection of elements ==
According to Howard Gardner, there is little dispute about the principal constituent elements of music, though experts differ on their precise definitions. Harold Owen bases his list on the qualities of sound: pitch, timbre, intensity, and duration while John Castellini excludes duration. Gordon C. Bruner II follows the line of temporal-based deductions in association with musical composition, denoting music's primary components as "time, pitch, and texture." Most definitions of music include a reference to sound and sound perception can be divided into six cognitive processes. They are: pitch, duration, loudness, timbre, sonic texture and spatial location.

A 'parameter' is any element that can be manipulated (composed) separately from other elements or focused on separately in an educational context. Leonard B. Meyer compares distinguishing parameters within a culture by their different constraints to distinguishing independent parameters within music, such as melody, harmony, timbre, "etc." The first person to apply the term parameter to music may have been Joseph Schillinger, though its relative popularity may be due to Werner Meyer-Eppler. Gradation is gradual change within one parameter, or an overlapping of two blocks of sound.

Meyer lists melody, rhythm, timbre, harmony, "and the like" as principal elements of music, while Narmour lists melody, harmony, rhythm, dynamics, tessitura, timbre, tempo, meter, texture, "and perhaps others". According to McClellan, two things should be considered, the quality or state of an element and its change over time. Alan P. Merriam proposed a theoretical research model that assumes three aspects are always present in musical activity: concept, behaviour, and sound. Virgil Thomson lists the "raw materials" of music in order of their supposed discovery: rhythm, melody, and harmony; including counterpoint and orchestration. Near the end of the twentieth century music scholarship began to give more attention to social and physical elements of music. For example: performance, social, gender, dance, and theatre.

According to the theory of the emotional origins of music proposed by David Teie, the primary elements of music can be traced back to two sources.

1. The sounds of the womb heard by the fetus during brain development, account for pulse, meter, predominance of discrete single-frequency units (notes), continuousness, and the most common frequency range of melodic instruments.
2. Emotionally generated vocalizations account for timbre, dissonance/consonance, and the ubiquity of musical instruments that produce resonance-enhanced periodic sounds.

== Definition of music ==
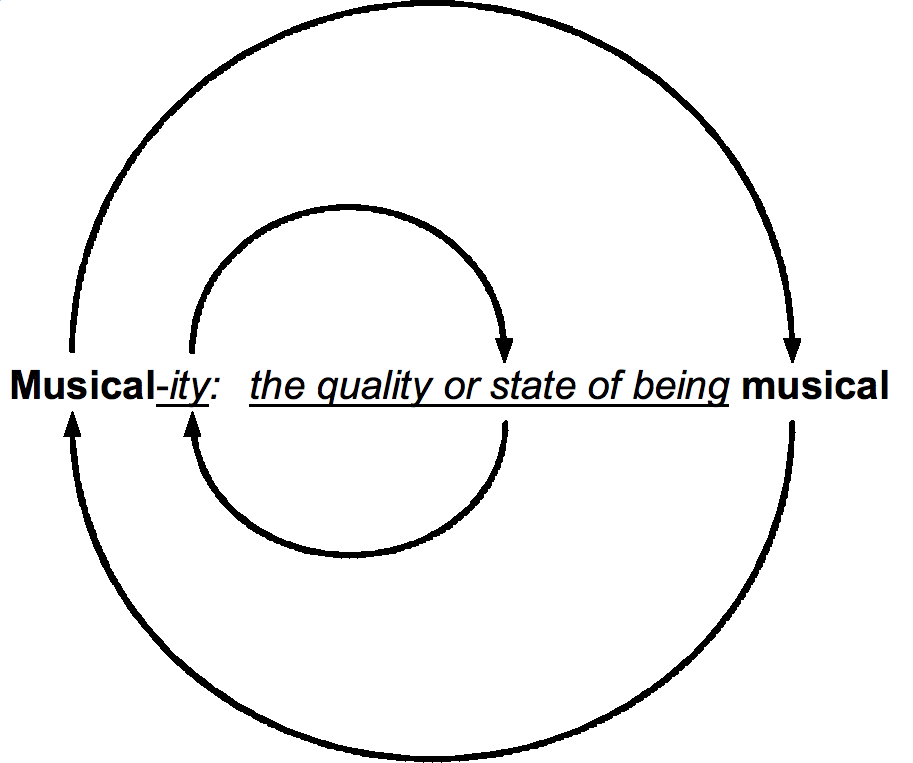
Circular definition of "musicality"

Does the definition of music determine its aspects, or does the combination of certain aspects determine the definition of music? For example, intensional definitions list aspects or elements that make up their subject.

Some definitions refer to music as a score, or a composition: music can be read as well as heard, and a piece of music written but never played is a piece of music notwithstanding. According to Edward E. Gordon the process of reading music, at least for trained musicians, involves a process, called "inner hearing" or "audiation", where the music is heard in the mind as if it were being played. This suggests that while sound is often considered a required aspect of music, it might not be.

Jean Molino points out that "any element belonging to the total musical fact can be isolated, or taken as a strategic variable of musical production." Nattiez gives as examples Mauricio Kagel's Con Voce [with voice], where a masked trio silently mimes playing instruments. In this example sound, a common element, is excluded, while gesture, a less common element, is given primacy. However Nattiez goes on to say that despite special cases where sound is not immediately obvious (because it is heard in the mind): "sound is a minimal condition of the musical fact".

== Universal aspect ==
There is disagreement about whether some aspects of music are universal, as well as whether the concept of music is universal. This debate often hinges on definitions. For instance, the fairly common assertion that "tonality" is a universal of all music may necessarily require an expansive definition of tonality. A pulse is sometimes taken as a universal, yet there exist solo vocal and instrumental genres with free and improvisational rhythm—no regular pulse—one example being the alap section of an Indian classical music performance. Harwood questions whether a "cross-cultural musical universal" may be found in the music or in the making of music, including performance, hearing, conception, and education.

One aspect that is important to bear in mind when examining multi-cultural associations is that an English-language word (i.e. the word "music"), not a universal concept, is the object of scrutiny. For this reason it is important to approach apparently equivalent words in other languages with caution. Based on the many disparate definitions that can be found just in English language dictionaries,) it seems there is no agreement on what the word "music" means in English, let alone determining a potentially equivalent word from another culture.

Kenneth Gourlay describes how, since different cultures include different elements in their definitions of music, dance, and related concepts, translation of the words for these activities may split or combine them, citing Nigerian musicologist Chinyere Nwachukwu's definition of the Igbo term "nkwa" as an activity combining and/or requiring singing, playing musical instruments, and dancing. He then concludes that there exists "nonuniversality of music and the universality of nonmusic".

== Other terms ==
Other terms used to discuss particular pieces include:

- Note—an abstraction that refers to either a specific pitch or rhythm, or the written symbol
- Chord—a simultaneity of notes heard as some sort of unit
- Chord progression—a succession of chords (simultaneity succession)

For a more comprehensive list of terms see: Outline of music

== See also ==
- Combinatoriality
- New musicology
- Noise in music
- Permutation (music)
- Philosophy of music
- Process music
- Serialism
- Set (music)
- Sound art
