= Emotional origins of music =

The theory of the emotional origins of music, first proposed by David Teie, is based on the proposition that "... human music presents, concurrently and consecutively, a quickly changing array of acoustic triggers that are specific to Homo sapiens... each capable of inducing an emotional response." The relevant acoustic triggers come from two primary sources: 1) sounds heard by the fetus in the womb, and 2) emotionally generated vocalizations.

== Fetal memory ==
The fetal memory, described as "Limbic system development memory"includes elements of music that are found in the music of all cultures: pulse, meter, notes, syllabic contour, melodic rhythm, melodic accents, phrase length, phrase contour, and melodic frequency range. There are four conditions of fetal development that allow for the development of lasting memories from the sonic environment of the womb:

1. The fetus is able to hear for four months prior to birth and responds to the mother's heartbeat.
2. The sound of the maternal heartbeat and voice are loud enough in the womb to dominate the basal noise.
3. Well-organized information that is incoming as the brain is being organized will tend to remain organized.
4. The brain structures responsible for emotions are almost completely formed at birth.

== Emotional vocalizations ==
Emotional vocalizations form the basis for the musical features timbre, tonality, frequency range, melodic contour, melodic rhythm, accents of melody, loudness, rate of syllabic repetition, vocal tract variables, tempo range, and the pervasive use of resonance-enhanced periodic sounds. Sounds that closely match templates of recognition of emotionally generated vocalizations trigger appropriate emotional responses. For example, the scream is recognized by our auditory processing as a human alarm call, triggering an attentive/fear response in the listener. The acoustic features of the scream present a loud periodic sound that has a harsh timbre. When an electric guitar presents loud periodic sounds that have been modified by a "fuzz box" creating a harsh timbre, the resulting combination is close enough to a match to the human alarm template for auditory processing to activate structures in the limbic system, triggering an attentive emotional response.
