= David Teie =

American zoomusicologist

David Teie is an American cellist and zoomusicologist. He is best known for creating Music for Cats, an album of music specifically designed to appeal to cats.

== Career ==
Teie received his bachelor's and master's degrees from the Peabody Conservatory and was a Fulbright scholar. In 1984, Teie joined the National Symphony Orchestra. He served as the acting principal cellist of the San Francisco Symphony for the 1999-2000 season, during which he collaborated and performed with heavy metal band Metallica. Teie served as music director of the Eclipse Chamber Orchestra from 2013 to 2016.

Inspired by his music career, Teie has conducted research on music and cognition, publishing articles in Biology Letters of the Royal Society and Applied Animal Behavior Science, and contributing a chapter to the Oxford University Press book Evolution of Emotional Communication offering a comprehensive theory of the origins and affective processes of music. Teie was a lecturer at the University of Maryland, College Park.

== Music for animals ==
Teie has undertaken several projects attempting to design music for specific non-human species. The foundation of the species-specific music that he composed was based on the discoveries and postulations from his theory of the emotional origins of music. One of the earliest was his project with the University of Wisconsin, where Teie managed to create music that appealed to Tamarin monkeys significantly more than typical music designed to appeal to humans. After the success of that project, Teie launched a Kickstarter campaign to raise $20,000 in funding for his project to create music designed for cats; he raised almost $250,000. Teie tested his music on cat audiences in cat cafés despite being allergic to cats. This music includes sounds cats find comforting and reminiscent of kittens, as well as music in pitches humans cannot hear but cats can. Using his music composition skills, Teie sought to "write music that would provide a shared emotional experience for cats and their humans." His album Music for Cats was released by Universal Music Group in 2016 and reached 33 in the UK Official Charts’ Top 40.

== Publications ==
- Snowdon, Charles T.; Teie, David; Savage, Megan (2015-05-01), "Cats prefer species-appropriate music", Applied Animal Behaviour Science, 166, Elsevier: 106–111, doi:10.1016/j.applanim.2015.02.012
