= List of medieval music theorists =

Medieval music is the music of the Western Europe during the Middle Ages, from approximately the 6th to 15th centuries. The first and longest era of Western classical music, medieval music saw the presence of various music theorists, such as Boethius, Hucbald, Guido of Arezzo, Johannes Cotto, Franco of Cologne and Philippe de Vitry.

== Medieval music theorists ==
Also a composer May have been a composer

Medieval music theorists
| Name | Lifetime | Nationality | Music theory works | Ref(s) |
|---|---|---|---|---|
| Boethius | c. 480 – 524 | Roman | De institutione musica | |
| Cassiodorus | c. 485 – 585 | Roman | Institutiones | |
| Isidore of Seville | c. 559 – 636 | Spanish | Etymologiarum sive Originum libri xx and De ecclesiasticis officiis | |
| Alcuin | c. 735 – 804 | Anglo-Saxon | De octo tonis and an unknown music treatise (both of uncertain authorship) | |
| Rabanus Maurus | c. 780 – 856 | Frankish | Throughout various works | |
| Johannes Scottus Eriugena | c. 810 – c. 877 | Irish | De divisione naturae and De divisione naturae | |
| Aurelian of Réôme | fl. 840–850 | Frankish | Musica disciplina | |
| Regino of Prüm | c. 842 – 915 | German | De synodalibus causis and Epistola de armonica institutione; Octo toni de musicae artis | |
| Hucbald | c. 850 – 930 | Benedictine | (De) Musica | |
| Remigius of Auxerre | fl. 862–c. 900 | Latin | The ninth book of De nuptiis Philologiae et Mercurii | |
| Odo of Cluny | c. 878 – 942 | French | Dialogus? | |
| Odo of Arezzo | fl. Late 10th century | Italian | | |
| Notker Labeo | c. 950 – 1022 | Benedictine | Five short essays | |
| Guido of Arezzo (Guido da Arezzo; Guido Aretinus) | c. 991 – after 1033 | Italian | Micrologus, Prologus in antiphonarium | |
| Wulfstan the Cantor | fl. 992–6 | English | Brevilioquium super musicam | |
| Odo de Saint-Maur-des-Fossés? | fl. 992–1029 | ? | Dialogus? Enchiridion musices? | |
| Otloh of Sankt Emmeram | c. 1010 – 1070 | Benedictine | None surviving; cited in William of Hirsau's De musica | |
| Hermann of Reichenau | 1013 – 1054 | Benedictine | Musica | |
| Berno of Reichenau | before 1014 – 1048 | Probably German | De quibusdam rebus ad misse officium pertinentibus and De consona tonorum diversitate | |
| William of Hirsau | c. 1030 – 1091 | Benedictine | De musica (Note: A second work, De musica et tonis, may be attributed to him, although it is now lost.) | |
| Aribo Scholasticus | fl. c. 1068–78 | Unknown | De musica | |
| Frutolf of Michelsberg | mid-11th century – 1103 | Unknown | Breviarium | |
| Theogerus of Metz | c. 1050 – 1120 | German | Musica | |
| Hugh of St Victor | c. 1096 – 1141 | Augustinian | A chapter in the Didascalicon | |
| Johannes Cotto | fl. c. 1100 | Unknown | De musica | |
| Guido of Eu | fl. mid-12th century | Cistercian | Regule de arte musica | |
| Theinred of Dover | fl. 12th century | English | De legitimis ordinibus pentachordorum et tetrachordorum | |
| Bartholomeus Anglicus | before 1200 – 1272 | English | Throughout De proprietatibus rerum | |
| Roger Bacon | c. 1214 – c. 1292 | English | Throughout various works | |
| Petrus de Picardia | fl. 1250 | French | Ars motettorum compilata breviter | |
| Elias Salomo | fl. 2nd half of the 13th century | French | Scientia artis musice | |
| Egidius de Zamora | fl. c. 1260–1280 | Spanish | Ars musica | |
| Magister Lambertus | fl. c. 1270 | Unknown | Tractatus de musica | |
| Amerus | fl. 1271 | English | Practica artis musice | |
| Hieronymus de Moravia | died after 1271 | Unknown | Tractatus de Musica | |
| Franco of Cologne | fl. mid to late 13th century | German | Ars cantus mensurabilis | |
| Engelbert of Admont | c. 1250 – 1331 | Austrian | De musica | |
| Jacobus of Liège | c. 1260 – after 1330 | Franco-Flemish | Speculum musice | |
| Johannes de Garlandia | fl. c. 1270 – 1320 | French | De Plana Musica and De Mensurabili Musica | |
| Johannes Balox | fl. late 13th century | Unknown | Abbreviatio magistri Franconis a[uctore] Johanne dicto Baloce | |
| Hugo Spechtshart | c. 1285 – 1359/60 | German | Flores musicae omnis cantus Gregoriani and Chronicon Hugonis sacerdotis de Rutelinga ad annum | |
| Petrus de Cruce | fl. c. 1290 | French | Tractatus de tonis (Note: Ars motettorum of Petrus de Picardia and Ars musicae mensurabilis secundum Franconem are attributed to him by some modern scholars.) | |
| Petrus Le Viser | fl. c. 1290–1300 | ? | | |
| Johannes de Muris | c. 1290–95 – 1344 | French | Notitia artis musicae, Compendium musicae practicae, Musica speculativa secundum Boetium, Libellus cantus mensurabilis, and Ars contrapuncti | |
| Philippe de Vitry | 1291–1361 | French | Ars nova | |
| Walter Odington | fl. 1298–1316 | English | Summa de speculatione musice | |
| Henricus of Zeelandia | fl. 14th century | South Netherlandish | Tractatus de cantu perfecto et imperfecto | |
| Johannes Vetulus de Anagnia | fl. 14th century | Italian | Liber de musica | |
| Willelmus | fl. 14th century | Unknown | Breviarium regulare musice | |
| Johannes de Grocheio | fl. c. 1300 | French | De musica | |
| Johannes Boen | early 14th century – 1367 | Dutch | Ars [musicae] and Musica | |
| Marchetto da Padova | fl. 1305–19 | Italian | Lucidarium in arte musice plane and Pomerium in arte musice mensurate | |
| Simon Tunsted | c. 1310 – 1369 | English | Quatuor Principalia Musicae | |
| Robert de Handlo | fl. 1326 | English | Regule cum maximis magistri Franconis cum additionibus aliorum musicorum | |
| Henricus Helene | fl. 1335 | French | Summula musice | |
| Petrus frater dictus Palma ociosa | fl. 1336 | French | Compendium de discantu mensurabili | |
| Egidius de Francia | fl. mid-14th century | French | De motettis componendis | |
| John of Tewkesbury | fl. 1351–92 | English | Quatuor principalia musice (Note: Contains long excerpts from other music theorists, including: Boethius, Isidore of Seville, Guido d’Arezzo, Magister Lambertus and Franco of Cologne.) | |
| John Hanboys | fl. c. 1370 | English | Summa | |
| Philippus de Caserta | fl. c. 1370 | Italian? | Incipiunt regule contrapuncti secundum magistrum phylippotum de Caserta: Sciendum est quod contrapunctum est fundamentum biscanti (Note: Two other surviving works by Caserta – Secundum magistrum Philipotum de caserta: Contrapunctus est fundamentum biscanti and Regula contrapunctus secundum philippotum de Caserta: Nota quod novem sunt speties contrapuncti – overlap heavily with Incipiunt. Some musicologists attribute De contrapuncto quaedam regulae utiles to Caserta.) | |
| Johannes Ciconia | c. 1370 – 1412 | Franco-Flemish | Nova musica | |
| Ugolino of Forlì | c. 1380–1452 | Italian | Declaratio musicae disciplinae | |
