= Conductus =

Sacred Latin song in the Middle Ages

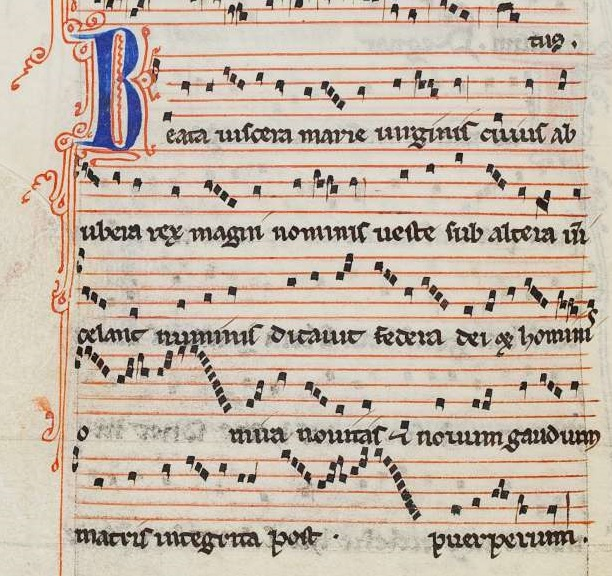
Conductus Beata viscera digital facsimile of Wolfenbüttel 1099

The conductus (plural: conducti or conductūs) was a sacred Latin song in the Middle Ages, one whose poetry and music were newly composed. It is non-liturgical since its Latin lyric borrows little from previous chants. The conductus was northern French equivalent of the versus, which flourished in Aquitaine around the Saint Martial school. The term is first found in the twelfth-century Aquitanian repertories, but the major collections of conducti are those of the Notre Dame school of Paris. The conductus typically includes one, two, or three voices. A small number of the conducti are for four voices. Stylistically, the conductus is a type of discant (i.e. note-against-note polyphony). Its form can be strophic or through-composed form. The genre flourished from the early twelfth century to the middle of thirteenth century. It was one of the principal types of vocal composition of the ars antiqua period of medieval music history.

== History ==
=== Origins of the name ===
The origin of the term "conductus" remains obscure. The noun is derived from the verb conducere, which can mean to lead, guide, or escort. Thus according to one hypothesis, the genre was called "conductus" because it served to accompany a procession while the lectionary was carried from its place of safekeeping to the place from which it was to be read. A manuscript in the Institución Colombina, Seville, records that the conductus Salve festa dies was used for the same role as the hymn with the same name and was sung during the procession to the altar. But conducere can also mean "to bring together" or "join together." According to this hypothesis, the genre was called "conductus" because it brings sequence or hymn together and the conductus was based on a condensed version of a sequence or hymn. An example is the conductus Orienti oriens, which is derived from the sequence Noster cetus iste letus.

=== Development ===
The genre of the conductus most likely originated in the south of France around 1150 and reached its peak development during the activity of the Notre Dame School in the early thirteenth century. The conductus is the northern counterpart of the versus. In some sources, the versus and conductus can be interchangeably used, since both of them are strophic and accentual Latin poems. However, the conductus might be different from Aquitanian versus due to its inclusion of a caudae at the end. The melismatic flourish (caudae) in the conductus can separate the text out and disrupt the overall structure while Aquitanian melismas keeps the flow going.

Much of the surviving repertoire is contained in the Florence Manuscript and also the manuscript Wolfenbüttel 1099. In early documents, the conductus was often called "Benedicamus trope" or "benedictio." The early conducti are simple and free from the section of melismatic flourishes known as caudae. Caudae appear more often in conducti composed after 1200. Most conducti in the large thirteenth-century manuscript collections from Notre Dame are for two or three voices.

=== Authorship ===
Many but not all conducti are anonymous. Some are attributed to some well-known poets and musicians of the time, such as Philip the Chancellor, Walter of Châtillon, Bernard of Clairvaux, Peter of Blois, and Perotinus. For instance, the text of the conductus Beata viscera was written by Philip the Chancellor and its music was attributed to Perotinus.

Common subjects of the poems are the lives of the saints, feasts of the Lord, the Nativity, as well as more current subjects such as exemplary behavior of contemporary witnesses to the faith, such as Thomas Becket. Some conducti from later period consist of songs which criticize abuses by the clergy, including some that are quite outraged. Other conducti refer to significant historical events. Philip the Chancellor's composition, Aurelianis civitas is associated with a student riot of 1200 in a French city, Orléans. In the poem, Philip lamented the conflict and its fatal consequences.

== Musical characteristics ==
=== Number of voices ===
The conductus can include either one voice or multiple voices, known as monophonic and polyphonic compositions. The surviving repertories indicates the monophonic conducti are about double sizes of the polyphony type. But it was the polyphonic conductus that become one of principal musical genres in Parisian polyphony. Some melodies form monophonic compositions provide the basis for the multiple-voice writing.

=== Form ===
The composition can be either in strophic or through-composed form. Unlike the motet, the conductus is not "based on pre-existing material." The composer invented the overall structure. In strophic form, the structure of each stanza is the same. In through-composed form, each stanza does not repeat. The strophic composition is typical in the earlier works. The through-composed composition came after 1200.

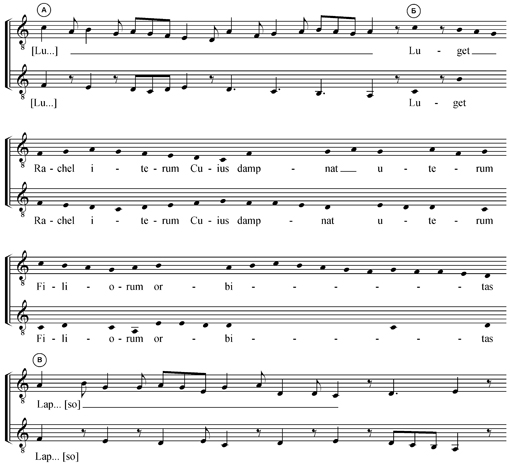
Transcription of the beginning of the 2 part conductus Luget Rachel iterum (Notre-Dame polyphony, Anonymous). Melismatic sections (cum cauda) A and В are originally mensurated (here transcribed by modal rhythmic laws). Syllabic section Б (sine cauda) is not mensurated in the original; here transcribed with quarters without stems

=== Style and declamation ===
In the conductus, the voices sang together in a style known as discant. Stylistically, it was different from the other principal liturgical polyphonic style of the time, organum, in which the voices usually moved at different speeds. The text declamation of the conductus can be either syllabic/neumatic or melismatic. The syllabic/neumatic type is coined the term musica cum littera. Monophonic pieces are mostly syllabic. The latter is called musica sine littera. The melismatic declamation can be applied to the caudae or the entire piece. The medieval theorist, Franco de Cologne refers to the conductus as discant. He advocated writing a beautiful melody in the tenor. Discantus positio vulgaris, one of the earliest conductus sources, mentions "conducts as a species of discantus."

=== Rhythm ===
The conductus is non-metrical, which means it is not sung in a strict rhythmic pattern. The German editor, Guido Maria Dreves, who compiled the conductus poem, suggests that each syllable is more likely to be sung in the same value. When the mensural notation later took over the unmeasured notation in the conductus, the conductus rhythm has changed. The Metz fragment shows the recopying of conductus in mensural notation occurred between 1260 and 1300. Thus, the conductus rhythm was later expressed by the rhythmic modes.

== Performance ==
In the documented liturgical use, the conductus was most likely a substitute for the versicle of "Benedicamus domino," which was performed at the end of Mass or the Office. "The performance of conducti is associated with the introduction of a reading within the liturgy." It serves as a cue for the following part of the ceremony. For the non-liturgical use, the conductus was sung during "the public readings in the chapter house and monastic refectory."

Medieval singers improvised the refrains of the conductus. The refrains serve as a visual cueing for the repetition of music and text. By changing the lyrics and rhythmic delivery of the refrains, singers can add improvisatory meaning to the conductus. Other improvisation includes creating new correspondence between music and text or changing the duration of each syllable. The conductus repertory with larger numbers of stanzas require singer's improvisatory skill.

== Reception history ==
The conductus flourished from the early twelfth century to the middle of thirteenth century. It was prominent in the thirteenth Parisian polyphony. Around 1300, the conductus became less popular. Early fourteenth century theorist Jacques of Liège, a vigorous defender of the ars antiqua style against the new "immoral and lascivious" ars nova style, lamented the disinterest of contemporary composers in the conductus. The conductus lasted longest in Germany, where it was documented into the fourteenth century. English conducti of the late thirteenth and early fourteenth centuries often use the technique of rondellus.

== References by medieval authors ==
Johannes de Garlandia (c. 1250) states that "The conductus is to be known that these figures are placed sometimes without text, sometimes with text; sine littera, as in caudae or in conducti, cum littera as in motets......It is seen in conducti or motets applied without text or with text, if they are properly notated."

Franco of Cologne (c. 1280) was the first to define conductus as a type of discant: "Cum littera et sine fit discant us in conductis." ("Both the tenor and the polyphonic superstructure must be invented by the composer.")

Anonymous IV (c. 1275) gives a few comments on polyphonic conducti in his treatise. Observing from Perotinus's conducti, he finds that the conductus contained both monophonic and polyphonic pieces with or without caudae. He also highlights that "all voices of conducti are customarily notated on five-line staves rather than on four-line staves as Gregorian chants."

Lambertus (c. 1278) associates the caudae of conducti with melismatic style. He states "hujusmodi figure aliquando ponuntur cum littera, aliquando sine. Cum littera vero, ut in motellis et similibus, sine littera, ut in neumatibus conductorum et similia." ("sometimes used for such figures and letters, sometimes without. When the letter to the motellis and the like, without a letter to the neumas the entrepreneurs and the like")

Walter Odington (c. 1300) describes conductus as "several suitable melodies brought together." He defines, "Conducti are composed of a number of suitable melodies, known or invented, and in various modes and with phrases repeated at the same pitch [in the same mode] or others…."

Johannes de Grocheio (c. 1300) follows Franco's definition and reiterates that the tenor of the conductus is newly invented: "Cantus corona tubs ab aliquibus simplex conductus dictus est…….ex omnibus longis et perfectis efficitur." ("The cantus corona tubs is said by some to be a simple conductus.")

== Selected discography ==
- Hyperion Conductus Project (3 CDs), John Potter, Southampton University
