= Jerome of Moravia =

Scottish friar and music theorist

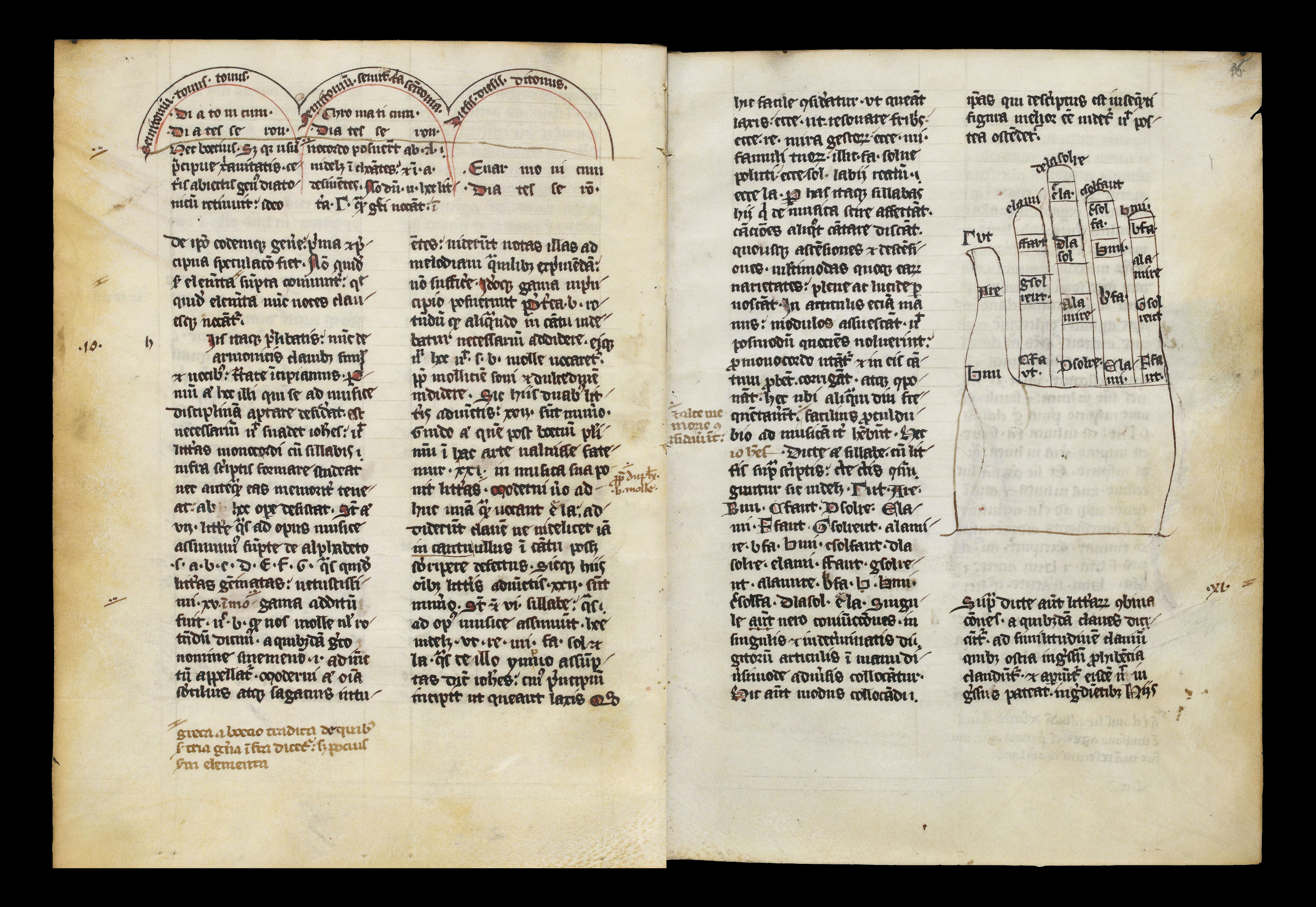
Excerpt showing a diagram of a hand from a 13th-century manuscript of Tractatus de Musica by Jerome of Moravia

Jerome of Moravia (or Hieronymus de Moravia) (died after 1271) was a Scottish friar and music theorist. He was a Dominican friar. His origin is unknown, but he is believed to have worked in Paris at the Dominican convent on the Rue Saint-Jacques. He most likely came from the Dominican convent in Elgin, Moray, as that was called Moravia Scotorum, although based on some renderings of his name he may have come from the Dominican community in Moravia.

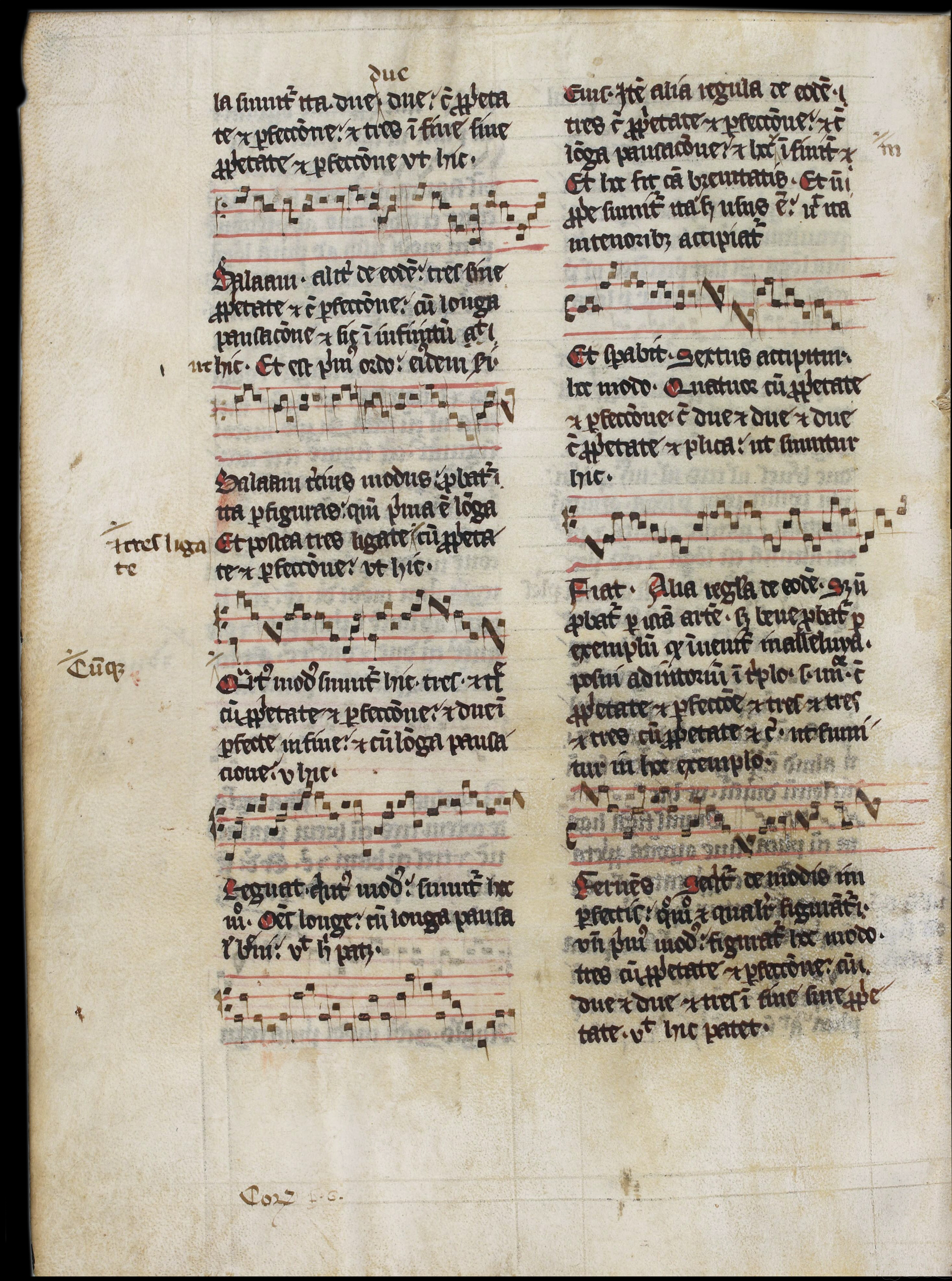
Excerpt showing musical notation from the same manuscript.

He is known for only one extant treatise "Tractatus de Musica" which was an encyclopedic treatment of the most important aspects of music in the Middle Ages: ars musica, mensural polyphony, mathematical treatments of music, and ecclesiastical chant. He copied large chunks of earlier music treatises. These included Boethius' De institutione musica and the treatises of Johannes Cotto, Johannes de Garlandia, Franco of Cologne and Petrus de Picardia. The treatise was probably compiled after 1272, and the only extant manuscript was probably copied before 1304. The original owner of this manuscript was Pierre de Limoges, and it was given to the Sorbonne when he died. Anonymous IV was most likely aware of this manuscript when he wrote.

The purpose of the manuscript was to educate mainly Dominican ecclesiastics about chant and polyphony, so that they could perform it and judge it.

== Source ==
- Jerome of Moravia. "Paris, Bibliothèque nationale, fonds lat. ms. 16663, f.1r-94r". Tractatus de Musica (incipit tractatus de musica pilatus a fratre jeronimo moravo ordinis fratrum predicatorum) (1275-1306).

== Edition ==
- Hieronymus de Moravia (1935). Cserba, Simon C. (ed.). Tractatus de Musica. Freiburger Studien zur Musikwissenschaft. Vol. 2. Regensburg: Pustet.

== Studies ==
- Frederick Hammond and Edward H. Roesner. "Hieronymus de Moravia", Grove Music Online, ed. L. Macy (accessed January 26, 2007), grovemusic.com (subscription access).
