= Cauda =

The cauda is a characteristic feature of songs in the conductus style of a cappella music which flourished between the mid-12th and the mid-13th century. The conductus style placed strict rules on composition, and some such rules were devoted to the cauda, which came at the penultimate syllable of each verse. It takes the form of a lengthy section of counterpoint - where several simultaneous melodies are combined into one - slurred over the one syllable. The cauda was repeated in each verse.

The significance of the cauda in conductus music is such that most conducti were divided into the categories conductus cum cauda and conductus sine cauda (conductus with or without cauda.) The latter made up less than a third of the repertoire.

The writing of medieval music did not include strict rhythmic notation, but when multiple notes were given to one syllable, known as a melisma, special notation, known as rhythmic modes, were used. As the cauda is a specific type of melisma, it contains this special notation.

The word "cauda" is derived from the Latin word for tail. The word served as the root of the modern term, coda, which arrived when Latin was replaced by Italian as the musical lingua franca.

Two notable examples occur in Vetus Abit Littera, a four-voice Christmas conductus from the Florence manuscript, and Dic Christi, Veritas, a tirade against clerical hypocrisy written by Philip the Chancellor. The latter is found in the Carmina Burana manuscript in a monophonic version and in the Paris sources in an elaborate three-voice setting, laden with caudae.

== See also ==
- Coda (music)
