= Ars antiqua =

Musical style of the High Middle Ages

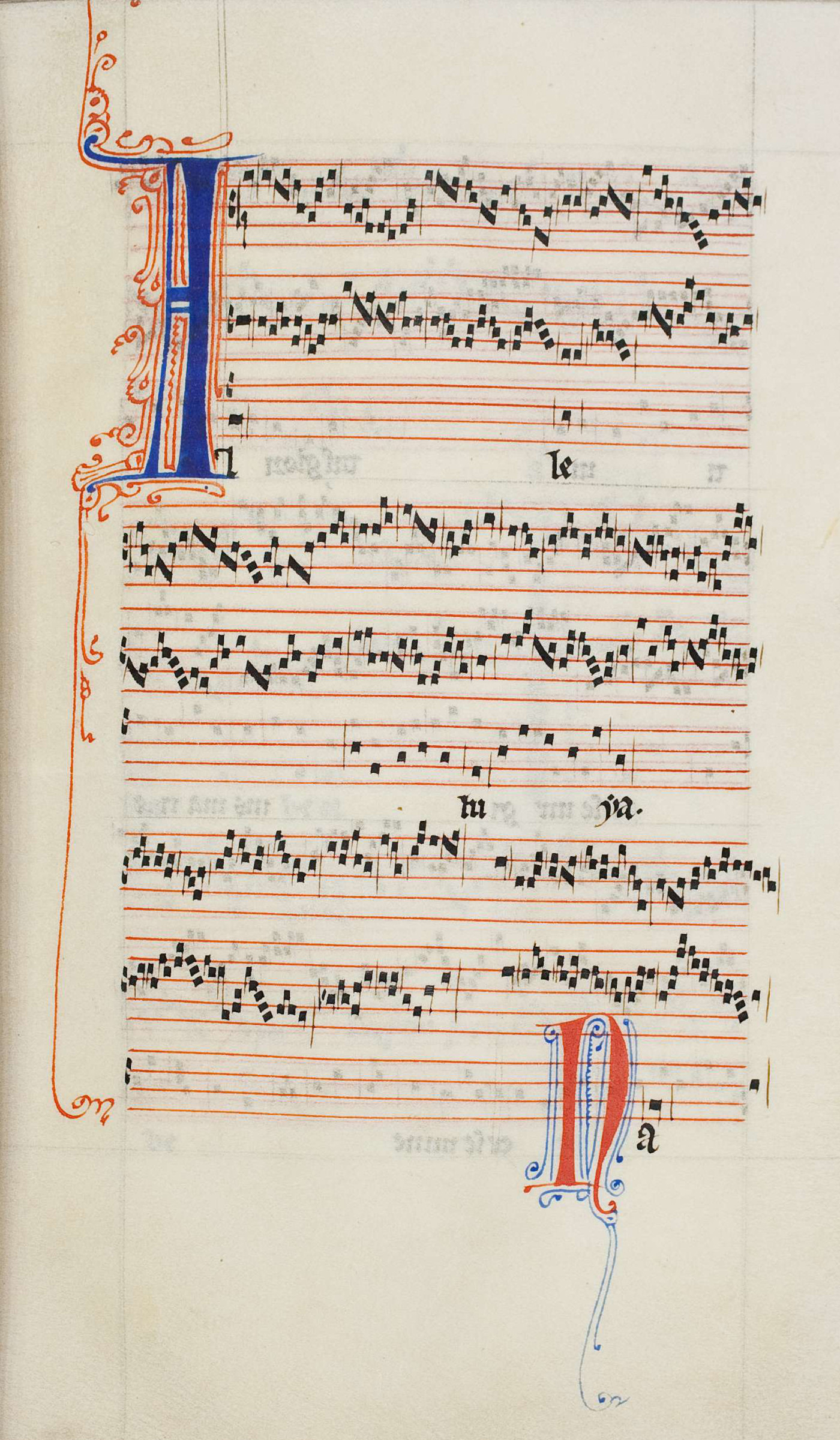
Pérotin, one of the few composers of Ars Antiqua who is known by name, composed this Alleluia nativitas in the third rhythmic mode.

Ars antiqua, also called ars veterum or ars vetus, is a term used by modern scholars to refer to the Medieval music of Europe during the High Middle Ages, between approximately 1170 and 1310. This covers the period of the Notre-Dame school of polyphony (the use of multiple, simultaneous, independent melodic lines), and the subsequent years which saw the early development of the motet, a highly varied choral musical composition. Usually the term ars antiqua is restricted to sacred (church) or polyphonic music, excluding the secular (non-religious) monophonic songs of the troubadours, and trouvères. Although colloquially the term ars antiqua is used more loosely to mean all European music of the 13th century, and from slightly before.

The term ars antiqua is used in opposition to ars nova (meaning "new art", "new technique" or "new style"). The transition from ars antiqua into ars nova is not clearly defined, recent interpretation has described the transition to be a gradual evolution rather than an abrupt revolution with the period being between the 13th–14th centuries.

== History ==
The original Medieval usage of the expression ars antiqua, found in the Speculum Musice of Jacobus and also by Johannes de Muris (the only one to use the exact term ars antiqua), referred specifically to the period of Franco of Cologne, approximately 1250–1310, but this restricted usage is rarely employed in modern scholarship. Almost all composers of the ars antiqua are anonymous. Léonin (fl. late 12th century), and Pérotin (fl. c. 1180 – c. 1220) were the two composers known by name from the Notre Dame school; in the subsequent period, Petrus de Cruce, a composer of motets, is one of the few whose name has been preserved.

In music theory the ars antiqua period saw several advances over previous practice, most of them in conception, and notation of rhythm. In the early Medieval music era, notation indicated the pitches of songs without indicating the rhythm that these notes should be sung in. The most famous music theorist of the first half of the 13th century, Johannes de Garlandia, was the author of the De Mensurabili Musica (c. 1240), the treatise which defined, and most completely elucidated rhythmic modes.

A German theorist of a slightly later period, Franco of Cologne, was the first to describe a system of notation in which differently shaped notes have entirely different rhythmic values (in the Ars cantus mensurabilis, c. 1280), an innovation which had a massive impact on the subsequent history of European music. Most of the surviving notated music of the 13th century uses the rhythmic modes as defined by Garlandia.

Though the style of the ars antiqua went out of fashion rather suddenly in the first two decades of the 14th century, it had a late defender in Jacques of Liège (alternatively known as Jacob of Liège), who wrote a violent attack on the "irreverent, and corrupt" ars nova in his Speculum Musicae (c. 1320) vigorously defending the old style in a manner suggestive of any number of music critics from the Middle Ages to the present day. To Jacques, the ars antiqua was the musica modesta, and the ars nova was a musica lasciva—a kind of music which he considered to be excessively indulgent, capricious, immodest, and sensual.

== See also ==
- Renaissance of the 12th century
- Polyphonic Era
- Medieval music

== Sources ==
- Anderson, Gordon A., and Edward H. Roesner. "Ars Antiqua [Ars Veterum, Ars Vetus]". The New Grove Dictionary of Music, and Musicians, edited by Stanley Sadie, and John Tyrrell. 29 vols. London: Macmillan Publishers, 2001. ISBN 1-56159-239-0.
- Jacobus of Liège. Speculum musicae, edited by Roger Bragard. Seven volumes in eight. Corpus scriptorum de musica 3. Rome: American Institute of Musicology, 1955–73.
