= Johannes de Grocheio =

French music theorist

Johannes de Grocheio (or Grocheo) (Ecclesiastical Latin: [jɔˈan.nɛs dɛ ɡrɔˈkɛj.jɔ]; c. 1255 – c. 1320) was a Parisian musical theorist of the early 14th century. His French name was Jean de Grouchy, but he is best known by his Latinized name. He was the author of the treatise Ars musicae ("The Art of Music") (c. 1300), which describes the functions of sacred and secular music in and around Paris during his lifetime.

== Biography ==
Johannes de Grocheio, originally named Jean de Grouchy, likely grew up in a wealthy family that controlled a fiefdom in Normandy. Grocheio studied music and philosophy in Paris, but there is no evidence that he received a degree. Despite the lack of such evidence, he is credited as magister (master) and regens Parisius (resident teacher in Paris) in the Darmstadt manuscript, although the latter title was added to the manuscript after it was copied. Grocheio may also have taught at the Basilica of St. Denis based on the plainsong he describes in the section on church music (musica ecclesiastica) in the Ars musicae. Not much else is known about Grocheio's life because any biographical information comes from the Ars musicae as well as scholarly research and speculation.

== Ars musicae ==
=== Topics discussed in treatise ===
Grocheio wrote about several principles of music in thirteenth-century Paris that he had observed. Grocheio's divides music into three categories: musica vulgaris ("music of the people"), musica mensurabilis ("measured music"), and musica ecclesiastica ("church music"). He also discusses music theory and compositional techniques such as mensural notation and musica ficta. Grocheio takes a scholastic takes approach in his treatise, rejecting Boethius' threefold division of music into musica mundana (music of the spheres) musica humana (music of the human body), and musica instrumentalis (vocal or instrumental music). Instead, he uses a technique of classification similar to Aristotle by taking a taxonomical approach used in several of Aristotle's works. Grocheio also consults and criticizes the works of many other music theorists, mathematicians, and philosophers such as Plato, Pythagoras, Johannes de Garlandia, Franco of Cologne, Nicomachus, and several others.

=== Musica vulgaris ===
Grocheio considers most of the music that the laypeople enjoy to be musica vulgaris. He describes this music as being able to ease the fears and sufferings of the people. Grocheio consulted a monk named Clement at the Abbey of Lessay as his source for musica vulgaris. Grocheio further specifies that there are two kinds of genres musica vulgaris: cantus and cantilena. Both could be performed with the voice or with instruments. Each genre had three song types that Grocheio described as follows:

==== Cantus gestualis, Cantus coronatus, and Cantus versiculatus ====
Cantus gestualis, better known as chanson de geste, is a song that is sung in honor of great figures such as French kings, particularly Charlemagne, Doon de Mayence, and Renaud de Montauban. It is intended to make people feel sympathetic for the heroic deeds and would urge them to rise above their station and serve the public by doing their jobs. Cantus coronatus is a song written by kings and nobles that was sung for them in order to give them the ability to become great leaders. The literary themes of the song include friendship and love. Cantus versiculatus is a song that was intended to be performed from young people who refused to work.

==== Cantilena rotunda, Cantilena stantipes, and Cantilena ductia ====
All of the cantilenas that Grocheio defines are dance songs that were performed for young people. Cantilena rotunda is a dance song that was typically performed in the wester regions of northern France such as Normandy. where he grew up. Grocheio cited a song that featured a rhyme scheme similar to the rondeau. Cantilena stantipes is better known as the estampie, because it is a dance song that features separate texts and musical content for the verses and refrains. Grocheio also notes it is difficult to dance to the cantilena stantipes due to its complexity. Cantilena ductia is another dance song that Grocheio described as having the ability to draw the hearts of young men and women away from erotic love. The cantilena ductia is believed to have been an early version of the virelai based on the repetition of the first line of the first stanza being repeated in subsequent stanzas.

=== Instrumental music ===
Grocheio discusses the use of instruments such as the trumpet, reed instruments, flutes, organs, drums, bells, cymbals, psalterium, cithara, lyre, and vielle. He specifically highlighted the use of the vielle as requiring virtuosic talent by being able to play any of the genres of the musica vulgaris. Grocheio also denotes two genres performed by wind instruments which are also called stantipes and ductia, which are also dance songs.

=== Musica mensurabilis ===
Grocheio distinguishes musica vulgaris from musica mensurabilis (measured music), which is intended for the educated and includes genres such as the motet, organum, and hocket. He specifies that the motet is to be performed for the clergy before feasts or during celebrations since they would be some of the only people who would appreciate the subtlety of the motet and could appreciate the "finer points of the arts".

=== Musica ecclesiastica ===
Grocheio discusses several aspects of musica ecclesiastica (church music) in his treatise. He describes the use of all of the chants in the Mass, the function of the eight church modes, and the threefold division of musica ecclesiastica into music for Matins, the Divine Office, and the Mass.

== Manuscripts ==
Grocheio's treatise survives in two manuscripts.

- Darmstadt, Hessische Landes- und Hochschulbibliothek, MS 2663, ff. 56-59.
- London, British Library, Harley 281, ff. 30-52.

One manuscript of the treatise is located at Darmstadt University's State Library as part of a theoretical anthology, containing writings by David of Augsburg, Hugo of St. Victor, Hugo of St. Cher, and several other anonymous authors. The Darmstadt manuscript is the only copy that credits the treatise to Johannes de Grocheio. The other manuscript of the treatise survives in the British Library in another anthology of music theory, including treatises by Guido of Arezzo, Guy of Saint-Denis, Petrus de Cruce, and several anonymous authors.

== Editions and translations ==
- Rohloff, Ernst, trans. Der Musiktraktat des Johannes de Grocheo nach den Quellen neu herausgegeben mit Übersetzung ins Deutsche und Revisionsbericht. Media latinitas musica 2, Gebrüder Reinecke, Leipzig 1943, p. 41-67.
- Say, Albert, trans. Johannes de Grocheo: Concerning Music (De musica). Colorado Springs College Music Press, translations (1), Colorado Springs 1973 (2nd. ed).
- Page, Christopher. "Johannes de Grocheio on secular music: a corrected text and a new translation.” Plainsong and Medieval Music 2, no. 1 (1993): 17-41.
- Johannes de Grocheio. Ars Musice, ed. and trans. Constant J. Mews, John N. Crossley, Catherine Jeffreys, Leigh McKinnon, and Carol J. Williams. Kalamazoo, MI: Medieval Institute Publications, 2011.
