= Music criticism =

Classical music criticism

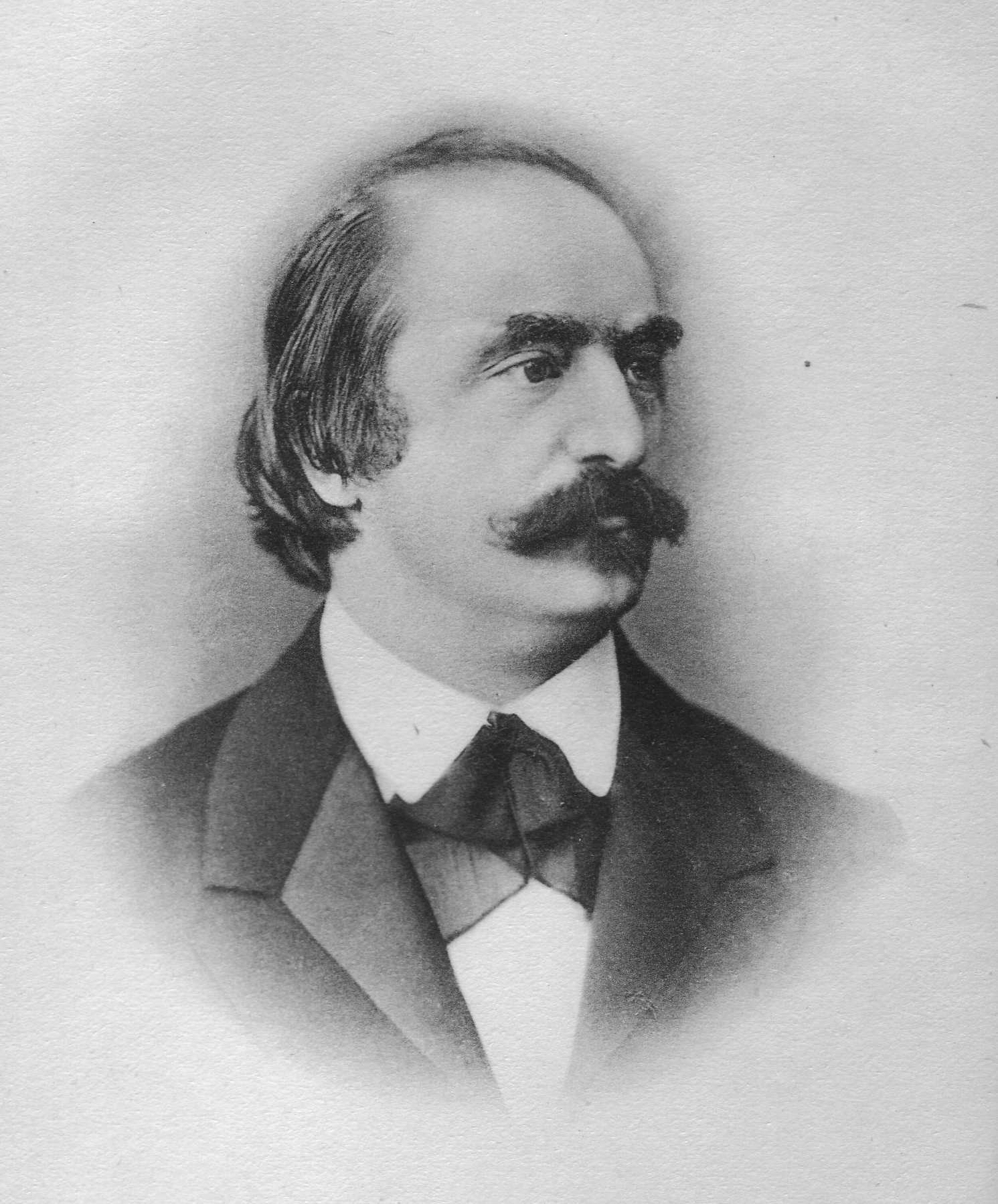
Eduard Hanslick, an influential music critic of the 19th-century

The Oxford Companion to Music defines music criticism as "the intellectual activity of formulating judgments on the value and degree of excellence of individual works of music, or whole groups or genres". In this sense, it is a branch of musical aesthetics.

With the concurrent expansion of interest in music and information media since the turn of the 20th century, the term has come to acquire the conventional meaning of journalistic reporting on musical performances.

== Nature of music criticism ==
The musicologist Winton Dean has suggested that "music is probably the most difficult of the arts to criticise." Unlike the plastic or literary arts, the 'language' of music does not specifically relate to human sensory experience – Dean's words, "the word 'love' is common coin in life and literature: the note C has nothing to do with breakfast or railway journeys or marital harmony." Like dramatic art, music is recreated at every performance, and criticism may, therefore, be directed both at the text (musical score) and the performance. More specifically, as music has a temporal dimension that requires repetition or development of its material "problems of balance, contrast, expectation and fulfilment ... are more central to music than to other arts, supported as these are by verbal or representational content." The absence of a systematic or consensus-based musical aesthetics has also tended to make music criticism a highly subjective issue. "There is no counter-check outside the critic's own personality."

== History ==
=== To end of 18th century ===
Critical references to music (often deprecating performers or styles) can be found in early literature, including, for example, in Plato's Laws and in the writings of medieval music theorists.

According to Richard Taruskin, the active concert life of late 18th-century London meant that "the role and the function of arts criticism as we know it today were the creations of the English public." However, the first magazines specifically devoted to music criticism seem to have developed in Germany, for example, Georg Philipp Telemann's Der getreue Music-Meister (1728), which included publications of new compositions, and Der kritische Musikus which appeared in Hamburg between 1737 and 1740. In France in the 1750s, the Querelle des Bouffons (the dispute between supporters of French and Italian opera styles as represented by Jean-Philippe Rameau and Jean-Baptiste Lully respectively) generated essays from Jean-Jacques Rousseau and others, including Denis Diderot's Rameau's Nephew (1761).

The English composer Charles Avison (1709–1770) published the first work on musical criticism in the English language – an Essay on Musical Expression published in 1752. In it, Avison claims that since the time of Palestrina and Raphael, music had improved in status whilst pictorial art had declined. However, he believes that George Frideric Handel is too much concerned with naturalistic imitation than with expression, and criticises the habit, in Italian operas, of

that egregious absurdity of repeating, and finishing many songs with the first part; when it often happens, after the passions of anger and revenge have been sufficiently expressed, that reconcilement and love are the subjects of the second, and, therefore, should conclude the performance.

Typically, until the late eighteenth century, music criticism centred on vocal rather than instrumental music – "vocal music ... was the apex of [the] aesthetic hierarchy. One knew what music was expressing."

=== Age of Romanticism ===
The last years of the eighteenth century reflected both a change of patronage of music from the aristocracy to the rising middle classes, and the rise of Romanticism in the arts. Both of these had consequences for the practice of music criticism; "the tone of the critic was lowered as his audience expanded: he began to approach the reader as a colleague rather than a pedagogue", and a new generation of critics began to widen their consideration to other aspects of music than its pure representative aspects, becoming increasingly interested in instrumental music. Prominent amongst these was E. T. A. Hoffmann, who wrote in 1809

That instrumental music has now risen to a level of which one probably had no inkling not long ago and that the symphony, especially following ... Haydn and Mozart, has become the ultimate form of instrumental music – the opera of instruments, as it were – all this is well-known to every music-lover.

A further impetus to the direction of music criticism was given by the changing nature of concert programming with the establishment of the European classical music canon; indeed it is at this period that the word 'classical' is first applied to a received musical tradition. At the same time, the proportion of new music to 'canonic' music in concert programming began to decline, meaning that living composers were increasingly in competition with their dead predecessors. This was particularly the case in respect of the rise of Beethoven's reputation in his last year and posthumously. This gave rise both to writings on the value of the 'canon' and also to writings by composers and their supporters defending newer music.

In 1798 the Allgemeine musikalische Zeitung, edited by Friedrich Rochlitz (1769–1842), began publication in Leipzig, and this is often regarded as the precursor of a new genre of criticism aimed at a wider readership than qualified connoisseurs. In subsequent years several regular journals dedicated to music criticism and reviews began to appear in major European centres, including The Harmonicon (London 1823–1833), The Musical Times (London, 1844–2024), the Revue et gazette musicale de Paris (Paris 1827–1880, founded by François-Joseph Fétis), the Berliner allgemeine musikalische Zeitung founded in 1825 by A.M. Schlesinger and edited by A. B. Marx, and the Neue Zeitschrift für Musik founded in 1834 in Leipzig by Robert Schumann and Friedrich Wieck, and later edited by Franz Brendel. Other journals at this period also began to carry extensive writings on music: Hector Berlioz wrote for the Parisian Journal des débats, Heinrich Heine reported on music and literature in Paris for the Stuttgart Allgemeine Zeitung, the young Richard Wagner wrote articles for Heinrich Laube's magazine Zeitung für die elegante Welt and during his 1839–1842 stay in Paris for Schlesinger's publishing house and German newspapers. The writer George Henry Caunter (1791–1843) was called "one of the first musical critics in the metropolis [London]". In 1835 James William Davison (1813–1885) began his lifelong career as a music critic, writing 40 years for The Times.

== See also ==
- List of chief music critics
- Music journalism for reporting on classical and popular music in the media
- Category: Music critics

== Sources ==
- Avison, Charles (1752). Essay on Musical Expression. London. Downloadable from IMSLP.
- Bujic, Bojan (n.d.) "Criticism of Music" in The Oxford Companion to Music, Oxford Music Online, accessed 1 January 2013.
- Charlton, David (2003). "Hoffmann as a Writer on Music", in Hoffmann (2003, 1–22).
- Conway, David (2012). Jewry in Music: Entry to the Profession from the Enlightenment to Richard Wagner. Cambridge: Cambridge University Press. ISBN 978-1-107-01538-8.
- Davison, J.W., ed. Henry Davison (1912). From Mendelssohn to Wagner: Memoirs of J. W. Davison. London: William Reeves.
- Dean, Winton (1980). "Criticism", in New Grove Dictionary of Music and Musicians (ed. Stanley Sadie) vol. 5, 36–50. London: Macmillan ISBN 0-333-23111-2.
- Graf, Max (1948). Composer and Critic: 200 Years of Musical Criticism. London: Chapman & Hall.
- Hoffmann, E. T. A., ed. David Charlton (2003).E. T. A. Hoffmann's Musical Writings. Cambridge: Cambridge University Press. ISBN 0 521 23520 0.
- Taruskin, Richard (2010). Music in the Seventeenth and Eighteenth Centuries, Oxford: Oxford University Press ISBN 978-0-19-538482-6.
- Urban, Sylvanus, ed. (1843). "Deaths", in The Gentleman's Magazine. London: William Pickering; John Bowyer Nichols and Son.
- Weber, William (2001). "From Miscellany to Homogeneity in Concert Programming", in Poetics 29, 127–34.
- Weber, William (2003). "Consequences of Canon: The Institutionalization of Enmity between Contemporary and Classical Music", Common Knowledge 9/2, 78–99.
