= John of Garlande =

John of Garlande may refer to:

- Johannes de Garlandia (philologist) (fl. c. 1205–1255)
- Johannes de Garlandia (music theorist) (fl. c. 1270–1320)
