= Ars cantus mensurabilis =

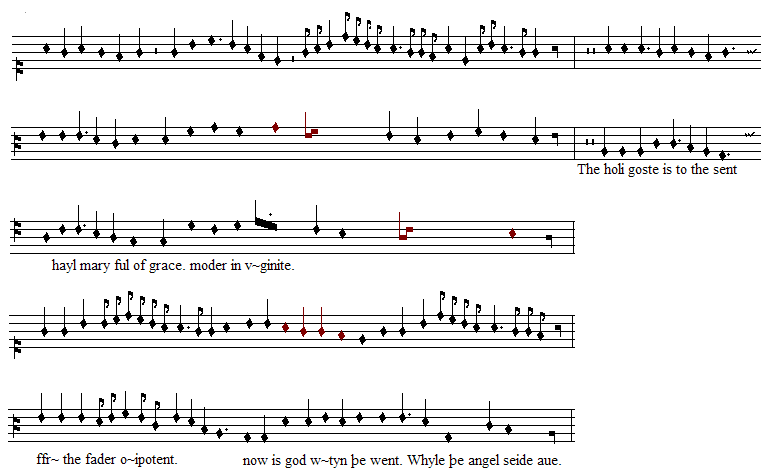
An example of mensural notation

Ars cantus mensurabilis (Latin for the art of the measurable song) is a music theory treatise from the mid-13th century, c. 1250–1280 written by German music theorist Franco of Cologne. The treatise was written shortly after De Mensurabili Musica, a treatise by Johannes de Garlandia, which summarised a set of six rhythmic modes in use at the time. In music written in rhythmic modes, the duration of a note could be determined only in context. Ars cantus mensurabilis was the first treatise to suggest that individual notes could have their own durations independent of context. This new rhythmic system was the foundation for the mensural notation system and the ars nova style.
