= Johannes de Garlandia =

Johannes de Garlandia may refer to:

- Johannes de Garlandia (philologist) (c. 1190–c. 1270), philologist and university teacher
- Johannes de Garlandia (music theorist) (fl. c. 1270–1320), French music theorist
