= Ars musica (Lambertus) =

Page from the earliest surviving manuscript

Ars musica ('musical art') or Tractatus de musica ('treatise on music') is a Latin treatise on music theory from the late 13th century. Its author is usually identified as the Parisian master Lambertus.

== Content ==
The Ars musica has a long prologue praising the "wisdom, virtue and eloquence" with which God has endowed philosophers culminating in "praise of the science of music". The prologue is followed by an introduction to musical theory based on the work of Dominicus Gundissalinus.

The first part of the treatise concerns musica plana (e.g., plainchant) and is based on the teaching of Johannes de Garlandia. The "distinctive feature" of this part of the text "is the author's insistent reference to sensory experience." The final section of this part is an exposition of modes in verse and a tonary.

The second part of the treatise concerns mensural music (musica mensurabilis). In the prologue to the second part, three mensural genres are identified: discant, hocket and organum.

== Authorship ==
A page from the second earliest manuscript

The authorship of the text is somewhat uncertain. The anonymous treatise De musica mensurata of 1279 attributes it to a certain Magister Lambertus, as does Johannes de Grocheio around 1300. Writing around 1330, however, Jacobus of Liège attributed it to a certain Aristoteles. In his 1864 edition, Edmond de Coussemaker accepted that the author's name was Aristoteles (Aristotle). More recently, it has been argued that, because the Ars musica appears alongside the Pseudo-Aristotelian Secreta secretorum in one manuscript, Jacobus may have taken it to have been by the same author. Alternatively, it may be that a scribe named Aristotle active in Paris in 1282 was misidentified as the author.

Magister Lambertus is generally identified with a professor of that name at the University of Paris who was also the dean of the collegiate church of Saint-Vincent de Soignies in Hainaut. In his testament of 1270, Robert of Sorbon named this Lambertus as his executor. Christian Meyer suggests that Lambertus authored only the part on mensural music and the verses on the nine rhythmic modes while a student later expanded it with the section on musica plana.

== Manuscripts and editions ==
The Ars musica is well represented in manuscripts for a musical treatise of its time. It survives in whole one manuscript (1) and in part in three others (2,3,4):

1. Paris, Bibliothèque nationale de France, Latin 11266, copied in Paris in the 1280s
2. Paris, Bibliothèque nationale de France, Latin 6755.2, copied in Germany in the early 1300s
3. Erfurt, Wissenschaftliche Allgemeinbibliothek, 8° 94, copied in England or Flanders in the mid-1400s
4. Siena, Biblioteca Comunale degli Intronati, L.V.30, copied in Italy in the late 1400s

The first edition of a part of the Ars musica was edited by Johann Herwagen and printed at Basel in 1563. Herwagen misattributed the text to Bede. The Ars musica was most recently edited by Christian Meyer and translation into English by Karen Desmond, with an introduction and notes by Meyer (translated into English by Barbara Haggh-Huglo).

== Sources ==
- Everist, Mark (1981). "Music and Theory in Late Thirteenth-Century Paris: The Manuscript Paris, Bibliothèque Nationale, Fonds Lat. 11266". Royal Musical Association Research Chronicle. 17 (1): 52–64. doi:10.1080/14723808.1981.10540898.
- Meyer, Christian; Desmond, Karen, eds. (2015). The ‘Ars musica’ Attributed to Magister Lambertus/Aristoteles. Ashgate.
