= Rhythmic mode =

Rhythmic patterns in medieval European music

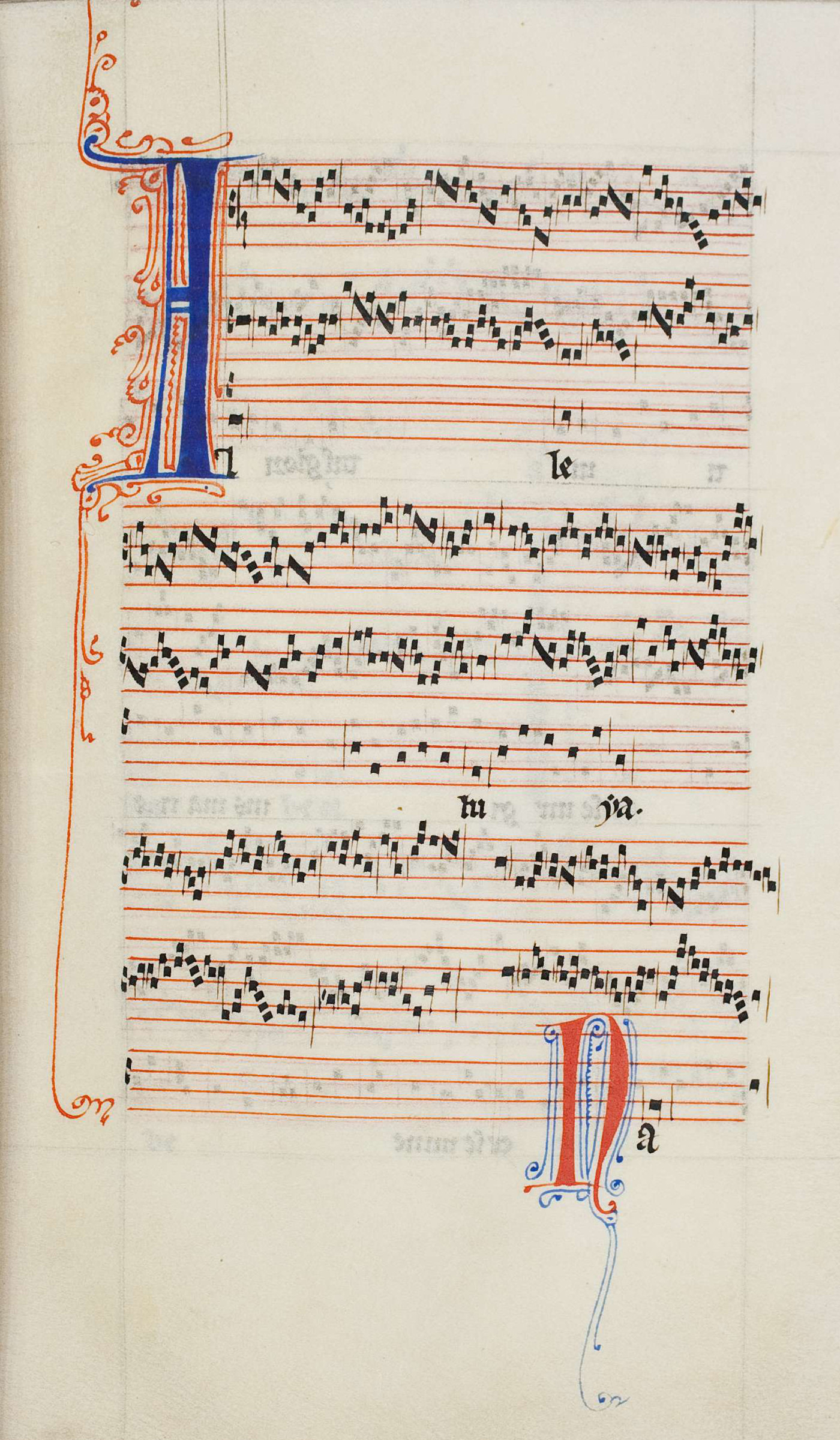
Pérotin, "Alleluia nativitas", in the third rhythmic mode.

In medieval music, the rhythmic modes were set patterns of long and short durations (or rhythms). The value of each note is not determined by the form of the written note (as is the case with more recent European musical notation), but rather by its position within a group of notes written as a single figure called a ligature, and by the position of the ligature relative to other ligatures. Modal notation was developed by the composers of the Notre Dame school from 1170 to 1250, replacing the even and unmeasured rhythm of early polyphony and plainchant with patterns based on the metric feet of classical poetry, and was the first step towards the development of modern mensural notation. The rhythmic modes of Notre Dame Polyphony were the first coherent system of rhythmic notation developed in Western music since antiquity.

== History ==
Though the use of the rhythmic modes is the most characteristic feature of the music of the late Notre Dame school, especially the compositions of Pérotin, they are also predominant in much of the rest of the music of the ars antiqua until about the middle of the 13th century.

Composition types which were permeated by the modal rhythm include Notre-Dame school organum (most famously, the organum triplum and organum quadruplum of Pérotin), conductus, and discant clausulae. Later in the century, the motets by Petrus de Cruce and the many anonymous composers, which were descended from discant clausulae, also used modal rhythm, often with much greater complexity than was found earlier in the century: for example each voice sometimes sang in a different mode, as well as a different language.

Most sources identify six rhythmic modes, as first explained in the anonymous treatise of about 1260, De mensurabili musica (formerly attributed to Johannes de Garlandia, who is now believed merely to have edited it in the late 13th century for Jerome of Moravia, who incorporated it into his own compilation). Each mode is a small pattern of long and short note values ("longa" and "brevis"), and each one corresponds to a certain metrical foot, as follows:

1. Long-short (trochee)
2. Short-long (iamb)
3. Long-short-short (dactyl)
4. Short-short-long (anapaest)
5. Long-long (spondee)
6. Short-short-short (tribrach)

Although these six modes were recognized as a system by medieval theorists, in practice only the first, second, third and fifth patterns were commonly used, with the first mode being by far the most frequent. The fourth mode is rarely encountered, an exception being the second clausula of Lux magna in MS Wolfenbüttel 677, fol. 44. The fifth mode normally occurs in groups of three (i.e. three pairs of long notes) and is used only in the lowest voice (or tenor), whereas the sixth mode is most often found in an upper part.

Modern transcriptions of the six modes usually are as follows:

1. Quarter (crotchet), eighth (quaver) (generally barred, therefore, in 3/8 or, because the patterns usually repeat an even number of times, in 6/8)
2. Eighth, quarter (barred in 3/8 or 6/8)
3. Dotted quarter, eighth, quarter (barred in 6/8)
4. Eighth, quarter, dotted quarter (barred in 6/8)
5. Dotted quarters (barred in either 3/8 or 6/8)
6. Eighths (barred in 3/8 or 6/8)
- Cooper gives the same transcriptions but doubled in length, thus his first mode is barred in 3/4, for example.
- Riemann is another modern exception, who also gives the values twice as long and in 3/4 time, but in addition holds that the third and fourth modes were really intended to represent the modern, with duple rhythms ( and, respectively).

== Notation ==
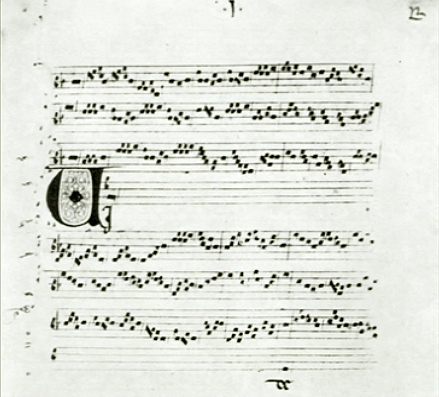
Pérotin, Viderunt omnes (Gradual for Christmas Day), in the first rhythmic mode. MS Florence, Biblioteca Medicea-Laurenziana, Pluteo 29.1, fol. 1 recto.

Devised in the last half of the 12th century, the notation of rhythmic modes used stereotyped combinations of ligatures (joined noteheads) to indicate the patterns of long notes (longs) and short notes (breves), enabling a performer to recognize which of the six rhythmic modes was intended for a given passage.

Linked notes in groups of:

3, 2, 2, 2, etc. indicate the first mode,
2, 2, 2, 2, … 3 the second mode,
1, 3, 3, 3, 3, etc. the third mode,
3, 3, 3, … 1 the fourth mode,
3, 3, 3, 3, etc. the fifth mode,
and 4, 3, 3, 3, etc. the sixth mode

The reading and performance of the music notated using the rhythmic modes was thus based on context. After recognizing which of the six modes applied to a passage of neumes, a singer would generally continue on in that same mode until the end of a phrase, or a cadence. In modern editions of medieval music, ligatures are represented by horizontal brackets over the notes contained within it.

All the modes adhere to a ternary principle of metre, meaning that each mode would have a number of beat subdivisions divisible by the number 3. Some medieval writers explained this as veneration for the perfection of the Holy Trinity, but it appears that this was an explanation made after the event, rather than a cause. Less speculatively, the flexibility of rhythm possible within the system allows for variety and avoids monotony. Notes could be broken down into shorter units (called fractio modi by Anonymous IV) or two rhythmic units of the same mode could be combined into one (extensio modi). An alternative term used by Garlandia for both types of alteration was "reduction". These alterations may be accomplished in several ways: extensio modi by the insertion of single (unligated) long notes or a smaller-than-usual ligature; fractio modi by the insertion of a larger-than-usual ligature, or by special signs. These were of two types, the plica and the climacus.

The plica was adopted from the liquescent neumes (cephalicus) of chant notation, and receives its name (Latin for "fold") from its form which, when written as a separate note, had the shape of a U or an inverted U. In modal notation, however, the plica usually occurs as a vertical stroke added to the end of a ligature, making it a ligatura plicata. The plica usually indicates an added breve on a weak beat. The pitch indicated by the plica depends on the pitches of the note it is attached to and the note following it. If both notes are the same, then the plica tone is the upper or lower neighbor, depending on the direction of the stem. If the interval between the main notes is a third, then the plica tone fills it in as a passing tone. If the two main notes are a second apart, or at an interval of a fourth or larger, musical context must decide the pitch of the plica tone.

The climacus.

climacus with ligature

The climacus is a rapid descending scale figure, written as a single note or a ligature followed by a series of two or more descending lozenges. Anonymous IV called these currentes (Latin "running"), probably in reference to the similar figures found in pre-modal Aquitanian and Parisian polyphony. Franco of Cologne called them coniunctura (Latin for "joined [note]"). When consisting of just three notes (coniunctura ternaria) it is rhythmically identical with the ordinary three-note ligature, but when containing more notes this figure may be rhythmically ambiguous and therefore difficult to interpret. The difficulty was compounded in the later half of the 13th century, when the lozenge shape came also to be used for the semibreve. A general rule is that the last note is a longa, the second-last note is a breve, and all the preceding notes taken together occupy the space of a longa. However, the exact internal rhythm of these first notes of the group requires some interpretation according to context.

It was also possible to change from one mode to another without a break, which was called "admixture" by Anonymous IV, writing around 1280.

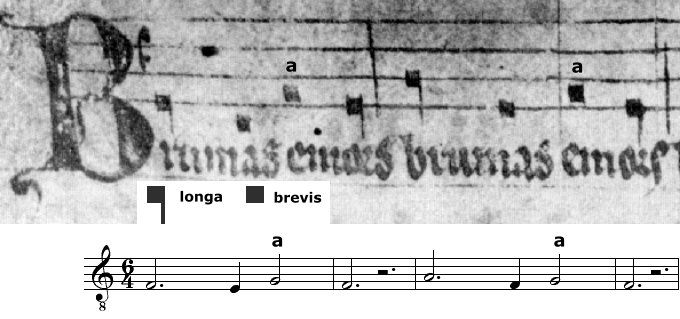
Tenor from Motet "Homo, luge!"/"Homo miserabilis"/"Brumans e mors" (13th century). Third rhythmic mode, syllabic notation.

Because a ligature cannot be used for more than one syllable of text, the notational patterns can only occur in melismatic passages. Where syllables change frequently or where pitches are to be repeated, ligatures must be broken up into smaller ligatures or even single notes in so-called "syllabic notation", often creating difficulty for the singers, as was reported by Anonymous IV.

An ordo (plural ordines) is a phrase constructed from one or more statements of one modal pattern and ending in a rest. Ordines were described according to the number of repetitions and the position of the concluding rest. "Perfect" ordines ended with the first note of the pattern followed by a rest substituting for the second half of the pattern, and "imperfect" ordines ended in the last note of the pattern followed by a rest equal to the first part. Imperfect ordines are mostly theoretical and rare in practice, where perfect ordines predominate.

Other writers who covered the topic of rhythmic modes include Anonymous IV, who mentions the names of the composers Léonin and Pérotin as well as some of their major works, and Franco of Cologne, writing around 1260, who recognized the limitations of the system and whose name became attached to the idea of representing the duration of a note by particular notational shapes, though in fact the idea had been known and used for some time before Franco. Lambertus described nine modes, and Anonymus IV said that, in England, a whole series of irregular modes was in use.
