= Polyphonic era =

The Polyphonic era is a term used since the mid-19th century to designate a historical period in Western classical music in which harmony in music is subordinate to polyphony. It generally refers to the period from the 13th to the 16th century. Most notated music consisted of the simultaneous flow of several different melodies, all independent and equally important, or polyphony. Usually made of four or five different choral parts, the music was originally for unaccompanied voices and was used mostly in the mass and motet of church music and the madrigal in secular music.

== Gothic period (c. 1170–c. 1310) ==
Earliest forms of notated polyphonic music are developed known as ars antiqua or "ancient art".

== Ars nova (14th century) ==
New techniques of rhythm and melody brought more feeling to the music, paving the way for the first important polyphonic music schools. "Ars nova" means "new art".

== Important polyphonic schools (15th–16th centuries) ==
- Netherland (Flemish) School: Guillaume Dufay (1400–1474), Josquin des Prez (c. 1450–1521), and Orlande de Lassus (1532–1594)
- Venetian School: Adrian Willaert (c. 1488–1562), and Giovanni Gabrieli (c. 1557–c.1612)
- Roman School: Giovanni Pierluigi da Palestrina (c. 1525–1594), and Tomás Luis de Victoria (c. 1548–1611)

== Secular polyphonic music (16th century) ==
- William Byrd (1543–1623)
- Thomas Morley (1557–1603)
- Claudio Monteverdi (1567–1643)
- Orlando Gibbons (1583–1625)

== Baroque period ==
During the Baroque period, forms become more elaborate, attention paid to dramatic effect, choruses combined with arias, duets and quartets with choral music accompanied by instruments. New church forms developed such as the oratorio, the passion, and the cantata.

- Heinrich Schütz (1585–1672)
- Giacomo Carissimi (1605–1674)
- J. S. Bach (1685–1750)
- G. F. Handel (1685–1759)

== 20th century ==
As a designation of an historical period, the term has become less convincing as polyphony increasingly reasserted its dominance over harmony in 20th-century music.
