= James McKinnon =

American musicologist (1932–1999)

James William McKinnon (April 7, 1932 – February 23, 1999) was an American musicologist most known for his work in the fields of Western plainchant, medieval and renaissance music, Latin liturgy and musical iconography.

== Life and career ==
He studied classical languages at Niagara University before going to Columbia University to study with Paul Henry Lang and Edward Lippman, completing his PhD in 1965. He also studied organ with Frederick Swann and was active as a church organist and choir director in New York throughout his life. He began teaching at State University of New York, Buffalo in 1967, where he stayed until 1989, becoming full professor in 1979 and serving as chair from 1987-89. He was also appointed Richard H. Fogel Professor of Music at University of North Carolina at Chapel Hill.

He was the author of five books, including Source Readings in Music History, Music in Early Christian Literature, and The Advent Project: The Later Seventh-Century Creation of the Roman Mass Proper, which attempts to reconstruct the history of plainchant from the Patristics (Early Church Fathers) to the Carolingian period. He also edited the collection The Music of Antiquity and the Middle Ages which includes chapters he wrote on early Western civilization, Christian antiquity and the emergence of Gregorian chant. McKinnon published more than one hundred articles in music journals and reference books.

== Selected bibliography ==
- McKinnon, James W. (January 1978). "Jubal vel Pythagoras, quis sit inventor musicae?" [Jubal or Pythagoras, who is the inventor of music?]. The Musical Quarterly. 64 (1). Oxford University Press: 1–28. doi:10.1093/mq/LXIV.1.1. JSTOR 741650.
- McKinnon, James W. (2001). "Jubal". Grove Music Online. Oxford: Oxford University Press. doi:10.1093/gmo/9781561592630.article.14520. ISBN 978-1-56159-263-0. (subscription, Wikilibrary access, or UK public library membership required)
- McKinnon, James W. (2001). "Ambrose". Grove Music Online. Oxford: Oxford University Press. doi:10.1093/gmo/9781561592630.article.00751. ISBN 978-1-56159-263-0. (subscription, Wikilibrary access, or UK public library membership required)
