= Henricus de Zeelandia =

Henricus de Zeelandia (Zelandia; fl. 14th century) was a South Netherlandish music theorist of medieval music.

He is the author of the Tractatus de cantu perfecto et imperfecto, a brief summary on music explicitly written for the benefit of students of plainchant. The treatise is an introduction to the Libellus cantus mensurabilis (c. 1340) attributed at the time to Johannes de Muris.

== Sources and Editions ==
The Tractatus exists uniquely in a single source Prague, Charles University Library, MS.XI E 9, fol. 242r–v (marked "243" on the manuscript and often cited as such), from the early fifteenth century, often connected with Strasbourg. The treatise begins "Gaudent musicorum discipuli" and ends with "sic omnibus esse recordor."

The Tractatus was first edited in the third volume of Edmond de Coussemaker's Scriptores de musica medii aevi (pp. 113–115). It was later edited by Zsuzsa Czagány, and this edition forms the basis of the transcription in the Thesaurus Musicarum Latinarum.
