= Edward Lippman =

American musicologist (1920–2010)

Edward Arthur Lippman (May 24, 1920 – June 9, 2010) was an American musicologist and professor emeritus of musicology at Columbia University.

== Early life and education ==
Lippman was described as a gifted musician; as a child, he played classical piano weekly on WNYC and later jazz piano in a hotel band. He was an honor graduate of Clinton High School in New York City. Lippman earned a Bachelor of Science from City College of New York in 1942. After graduating, he taught radar to Air Force trainees.

While a graduate student at New York University, he taught calculus, English, and radio and television repair at the RCA Institutes. Lippman earned a Master of Arts in 1945. Lippman earned a PhD from Columbia University in 1952, his dissertation examined music and space.

== Career ==
Lippman variously taught at City College of New York, Hunter College, Brooklyn College, Queens College and Bryn Mawr. In 1954, he joined the faculty at Columbia and was appointed professor in 1969. Lippman's research and teaching focus was on the philosophy and aesthetics of music. Lippman's book Musical Thought in Ancient Greece is described as an important exposition of Greek philosophy of music and one of the few compilations of this size and scope in English.

== Select works ==
=== Books ===
- Musical Thought in Ancient Greece. New York: Columbia University Press. 1964. ISBN 978-0231027267.
- A Humanistic Philosophy of Music. New York: New York University Press. 1977. ISBN 978-0814749739.
- Musical Aesthetics: A Historical Reader. New York: Pendragon Press. 1986–90. (3 volumes)
- A History of Western Musical Aesthetics. Lincoln: University of Nebraska Press. 1992. ISBN 978-0803228634.

=== Articles ===
- Lippman, Edward A. (1963). "The Sources and Development of the Ethical View of Music in Ancient Greece". The Musical Quarterly. XLIX (2): 188–209. doi:10.1093/mq/XLIX.2.188.
- Lippman, Edward A. (October 1, 1964). "Theory and Practice in Schumann's Aesthetics". Journal of the American Musicological Society. 17 (3): 310–345. doi:10.2307/830093. hdl:10017/36429. JSTOR 830093.
- Lippman, Edward A. (April 1, 1963). "Hellenic Conceptions of Harmony". Journal of the American Musicological Society. 16 (1): 3–35. doi:10.2307/829917. JSTOR 829917.
