= Wolf Frobenius =

German musicologist (1940–2011)

Wolf Frobenius (1 June 1940 – 4 July 2011) was a German musicologist and lecturer, who taught at the Saarland University.

== Life ==
Born in Speyer, Frobenius studied musicology, art history and history at the University of Freiburg from 1960 to 1968 (with two semesters abroad at the University of Paris), where he became a Dr. phil. in 1968 with a thesis on Johannes Boens. From 1968 to 1988, he was a research assistant at the Hand Dictionary of Musical Terminology (for which he wrote 24 articles) and edited the Deutsche Forschungsgemeinschaft Terminology for Rhythm and Notation of Mensural Music (1969-1975), Terminology of Musical Time Organization (1975-1978) and Names of the Types of the mehrst. Satzes (1978-1979), from which numerous monographs on the history of concepts have emerged.

From 1971 to 1988, Frobenius was lecturer at the University of Freiburg im Breisgau. After his habilitation in 1988, he became a professor at the Saarland University. Frobenius did research on the early beginnings of music and was active in the field of early polyphony. He wrote an article on the music of the Middle Ages for the encyclopaedia Die Musik in Geschichte und Gegenwart. Just like the beginnings of music, he was interested in the sound worlds that Neue Musik opened up. His main areas of research were the music and music theory of the Middle Ages and the 20th century. He was regarded as an expert on Robert Schumann and New Music.

Frobenius died on 4 July 2011 at the age of 71 in Saarbrücken. Shortly before that he appeared as editor of the volume Musik des Mittelalters und der Renaissance together with Rainer Kleinertz and Christopher Flamm at the Georg Olms Verlag. In his honour, a commemorative lecture was given by Rob C. Wegman from the Princeton University on the Paradoxes in the Tradition of Organa dupla of the Notre Dame Epoch. 4

== Work ==
=== Publications ===
- Johannes Boens Musica und seine Konsonanzlehre. (Dissertation, Freiburg im Breisgau 1968) Stuttgart 1971. (Freiburger Schriften zur Musikwissenschaft, vol. 2.)
- Carmen Maria Carnecis "Trojtza für 15 Spieler" (1989/90). Zur Genese des Stückes. Saarbrücken 1995.

=== Articles and essays ===
- 21 begriffsgeschichtliche Monographien in HMT, 1.–16. Auslieferung (1972–1989)
- Zur Datierung von Francos Ars cantus mensurabilis, in AfMw 27, 1970, pp. 122–127
- Über das Zeitmaß Augenblick in Adornos Kunsttheorie, in AfMw. 34, 1979, p. 279-304
- Politisierung der Ästhetik zwecks Ästhetisierung der Politik. Zur Funktion der Musik im Dritten Reich, in Freiburger Universitätsblätter 68, 1980, pp. 49–56
- Krenek und Ockeghem, in Ernst Krenek von O. Kolleritsch, Vienna/Graz 1982, (Studien zur Wertungsforschung 15) pp. 152–173
- Bartók und Bach, in AfMw 41, 1984, pp. 54–67
- Petrus de Cruces Motette „Aucun ont trouvé chant par usage/Lonc tans me sui tenu de chanter/ANNUNTIANTES“. Frz. Motettenkompos. um 1300, in Fs. H. H. Eggebrecht, edited by W. Breig / R. Brinkmann / E. Budde, Stuttgart 1984, pp. 29–39 (BzAfMw 23)
- Zum genetischen Verhältnis zwischen Notre-Dame-Klauseln und ihren Motetten, in AfMw 44, 1987, pp. 1–39
- Numeri armonici. Die Zahlen der Timaios-Skala in der Mth. des 14. Jh., in Kontinuität und Transformation der Antike im MA., edited by W. Erzgräber, Sigmaringen 1989, pp. 245–260
- Der Musiktheoretiker von Köln, in Die Kölner Univ. im MA., edited by A. Zimmermann, Berlin. 1989 (Miscellanea mediaevalia 20), pp. 345–356
- Gottfried Michael Koenig als Theoretiker der seriellen Musik, in Gottfried Michael Koenig, edited by H.-K. Metzger / R. Riehn, Munich 1989 (Musik-Konzepte 66), pp. 77–104
- Methoden und Hilfsmittel ma. Mth. und ihr Vokabular, in Méthodes et instruments du travail intellectuel au moyen âge. Études sur le vocabulaire, edited by O. Weijers, Turnhout 1990 (CIVICIMA. Études sur le vocabulaire intellectuel du moyen âge 3), pp. 121–136
- Die Motette (13. Jh.), in Die Musik des Mittelalters, edited by H. Möller u. R. Stephan, Laaber 1991 (NHdb 2), pp. 272–294
- Zur Begriffsgeschichte von „Akademie“, in Fs. W. Braun, edited by W. Frobenius, N. Schwindt-Gross u. Th. Sick, Saarbrücken 1993 (Saarbrücker Studien zur Musikwissenschaft. N. F. 7), pp. 11–30
- Ars antiqua, in MGG2, Sachteil (1994)
- Cantus coronatus, in MGG2, Sachteil (1995)
- La Ballade pour piano op. 10 Nr. 1 de Johannes Brahms, in Ostinato rigore 10, 1997, pp. 125–136
- Luigi Nonos Streichquartette. "Fragmente – Stille, An Diotima", in AfMw 54, 1997, pp. 177–193
- Schumann in der Musik nach 1950, in Robert Schumann: philologische, analytische, sozial- und rezeptionsgeschichtliche Aspekte, edited by W. Frobenius among others, Saarbrücken 1998 (Saarbrücker Stud. zur Mw. N.F. 8), p. 199-218
- Tempo (von der Zeit Beethovens bis zur Gegenwart), in MGG2, Sachteil (1998)
- La Genèse du premier mouvement du premier Concerto pour piano de Brahms: observations sur le ms. autographe, in Ostinato rigore 13, 1999, pp. 67–74
- György Ligeti und der Serialismus, in Zwischen Volks- und Kunstmusik. Aspekte der ungarischen Musik, edited by Stefan Fricke, W. Frobenius, Sigrid Konrad & Theo Schmitt, Saarbrücken 1999, pp. 162–167
- John Cage und sein Orchesterstück 103 (1991), in AfMw 56, 1999, pp. 146–157
- Musikalische Kompositionen – eine Errungenschaft der französischen Musikkultur", in Die französische Kultur – interdisziplinäre Annäherungen, edited by H.-J. Lüsebrink, St. Ingbert 1999 (Annales Univ. Saraviensis 12), pp. 27–49
- Josquins Chanson Plus nulz regrets. Quellenkritik und Analyse, in Festschrift W. Braun, edited by B.R. Appel, K.W. Geck u. H.Schneider, Saarbrücken 2001 (Saarbrücker Stud. zur Mw. N. F. 9), pp. 431–453
- Polyphony (Western), in New GroveD (2001)
- Textdeklamation in Schönbergs Erwartung, in Studien und Materialien zur Vokalmusik des 20. Jahrhunderts. edited by Chr. Rolle u. H. Schneider, Regensburg, ConBrio-Verlag 2004
- "Plourés, dames". Zur Balladenmelodik Machauts, in Festschrift Herbert Schneider, edited by Michelle Biget-Mainfroy and Rainer Schmusch, Hildesheim 2007, pp. 137–148.
- Zwei Geistliche Gesänge aus Hugo Wolfs Spanischem Liederbuch und ihre Bearbeitung durch Igor Strawinsky, in Das österreichische Lied und seine Ausstrahlung in Europa, edited by Pierre Béhar and Herbert Schneider, Hildesheim 2007, pp. 367–381.
- "Wuchsform" Ein Begriff von Rudolf Schwarz in Anton Weberns Analyse seines Streichquartetts op.28 von 1939, in Sprachen der Kunst, Festschrift Klaus Güthlein, edited by Lorenz Dittmann among others, Worms 2007, pp. 265–276.
- Zur musikalischen Form von Dufays "Vergene bella", in Musik des Mittelalters und der Renaissance. Festschrift Klaus-Jürgen Sachs zum 80. Geburtstag, edited by Rainer Kleinertz, Christoph Flamm und Wolf Frobenius (Studien zur Geschichte der Musiktheorie 8), Hildesheim 2011, pp. 331–336
