= Petrus de Cruce =

13th-century French priest and composer

Petrus de Cruce (also Pierre de la Croix) was active as a cleric, composer and music theorist in the late part of the 13th century. His main contribution was to the notational system.

== Life ==
13th-century composer, theorist, and scholar, Petrus de Cruce was apparently born in or near Amiens, in north-central France; for dates we know only that he was active in the years around 1290. He held the title of magistar, indicating that he probably studied at the University of Paris. Given the overlap of their lives and supposed tenures at Paris, Petrus may have been Franco of Cologne's student. It is recorded that in 1298 he composed a monophonic office for the royal palace chapel at Paris, and that in 1301–2, he resided at the court of the Bishop of Amiens, undoubtedly as a member of his clerical staff, and most likely his chapel staff as well. Petrus died before 1347, since in that year is the first reference in the inventory of Amiens Cathedral to its possession of a polyphonic manuscript which he had apparently left them in his will. Contemporary and slightly later commentators spoke well of Petrus de Cruce; no less than the theorist Jacobus de Liėge called him, "that worthy practical musician, who composed so many beautiful and good pieces of mensural polyphony and followed Franco’s precepts."

== Theoretical contributions ==
Mensural notation had developed by fits and starts during the 13th century as the old ligatures/rhythmic modes became, for various reasons, less suited to the indication of polyphony’s new subtleties, as we shall see below. Not the least problem was that notation in individual part-books was cheaper than notation in score (since each piece took up much less overall space), so a way had to be found of doing it—this would involve the development of a reliable system by which to indicate note-by-note metrical value. The beginning of such a solution was Franconian notation, so called after the theorist Franco of Cologne, who outlined the system in his c. 1260 treatise, Ars cantus mensurabilis (The art of mensurable music). This system recognized the double-long, long, breve, and semi-breve as the units of note value, related to one another by triple grouping; the double was always worth two longs, but a long could be perfect (and therefore worth three breves) or imperfect (and worth only two), depending on the exact sequence of notes. The breve was the "tempus", equivalent to the ‘unit of the beat’ in modern notation (three quarters to a measure in ¾ time, etc.), or a modern measure if we consider all of the music to have been in 3/1, so perfect tempus was triple meter, and imperfect tempus would be duple once introduced. A breve could theoretically be worth either three semi-breves or two in Franconian notation, but if worth two, one or the other would be doubled in length. There was no provision in this notation for equal duple division, which (along with imperfect tempus, therefore) would have to wait until de Vitry codified the concept of prolation in his Ars nova of 1322.

By the 1280s, tripla (the top parts of motets and other polyphonic pieces) were moving more rapidly and independently than before, with the chant-based tenors becoming slower moving, supporting parts. Since composers wanted to maintain speech rhythms in their tripla, they looked for a way to divide the tempus into more than three semi-breves, which in modern notation would be the equivalent of a tuplet (triplet, quartolet, quintuplet, etc.); motets which do this bear the name “Petronian”, after the most prominent user of the style. One way of indicating this division was to line up the voices one atop another in score notation, so that the tempus could be seen by examining the lower parts, still wedded to rhythmic mode. This would have been a waste of precious resources, however, and was no more an option now than it had been before. Petrus, who often divided his breves into as many as seven semi-breves, developed the dot of division (punctum divisionis), which are dots placed in between semi-breves to group them; thus a series of five semi-breves separated by dots from those surrounding them would be understood by the reader as occurring in the space of one breve. In later, 15th and 16th century notation, confusion between dots of division and the later innovation of dots indicating extended note values creates transcription problems for editors, but it is usually possible to tell from context, as well as prevailing tempus and prolation, which is meant; indeed, the dot of division is rarely required, since a run of semi-breves coming between two ligatures is clearly a grouping.

Petrus's free usage of the divided breve had far-reaching implications for musical style. With more notes, the triplum became the most prominent of the three voices in contemporary texture, and the other two were relegated to a supporting role. Also, more notes and more intricate subdivision led to a slowing of general tempo—the semi-breve was performed more slowly than it had been in earlier practice, becoming the true unit of the beat, and the lower voices lost their rhythmic vitality, becoming mere structural successions of breves and longs.

== Petronian motet ==
Composed around 1300, these motets are still considered part of the Ars Antiqua. Characteristics include further division of the triplum, the motetus and triplum move toward light and elegant expression, and a lack of concern for principles of proper textual accentuation.

== See also ==
- Medieval music
- Mensural notation
- Franco of Cologne
- Motet
