= Philip the Chancellor =

13th-century French theologian and poet

Philip the Chancellor, (French: Philippe le Chancelier) also known as "Philippus Cancellarius Parisiensis" (Philip, Chancellor of Paris) (c 1160–December 26, 1236) was a French theologian, Latin lyric poet, and possibly a composer as well. He was Chancellor of Notre-Dame de Paris starting in 1217 until his death, and was also Archdeacon of Noyon. Philip is portrayed as an enemy to the Mendicant orders becoming prevalent at the time, but this has been greatly exaggerated. He may have even joined the Franciscan order soon before his death.

Philip was one of the most prolific Medieval lyric poets. He was the subject of Henri d'Andeli's Dit du Chancelier Philippe. Philip's most influential work was his Summa de Bono.

== Biography ==
Philip was born in Paris between 1165 and 1185 to an important Parisian family. He was the illegitimate son of Philippe, Archdeacon of Paris (born in 1125), and was part of a family of powerful clerics. In particular, his uncle, Peter of Nemours, was Bishop of Paris 1208–18 and undoubtedly helped to foster Philip's ecclesiastical career. Philip received his education at the University of Paris, where he became Master of Theology around the year 1206. In 1211 he was already Archdeacon of Noyon, and in 1217, he became Chancellor of Notre-Dame de Paris.

Philip was engaged in many of the conflicts that troubled the Church and the University of Paris in the years following. In 1228, he was defeated by William of Auvergne in the running for the episcopacy in Paris. Philip retained his chancellorship until his death December 1236. During his academic teaching career, Philip discussed numerous theological questions that are recollected in Douai, ms. 434, and between 1225 and 1228 he wrote his principal work, Summa de bono. He was also the author of the Distinctiones super Psalterium and some poetic lyrics. Philip may have been a composer as well as a poet, although it is not certain, since many of his works are set to pre-existing tunes. He put text to many of Pérotin's works, creating some of the first Motets. His poems were available to many composers in the Notre-Dame school, and his works were a moving force within that artistic movement.

== Works ==
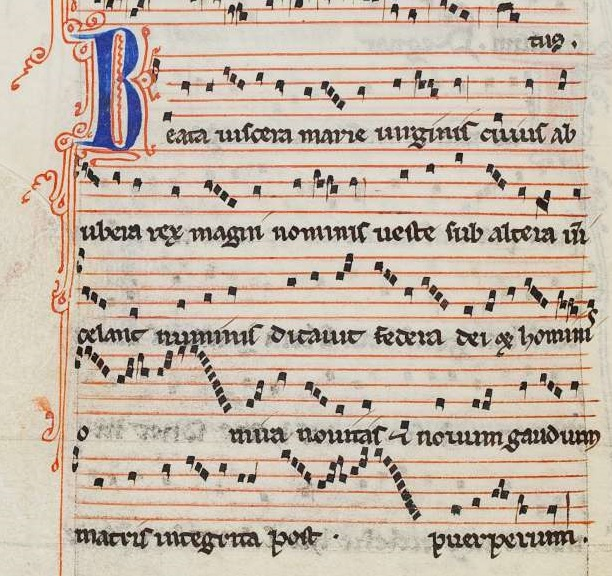
Beata viscera, a conductus arranged by Pérotin; the text is attributed to Philip the Chancellor.

The Summa de bono is the first full-scale treatment of the doctrine of transcendentals in the history of Western philosophy, and it had considerable influence on the earliest generation of Parisian masters. Although its structure can be considered quite similar to other well-known texts of the time, such as that of Peter Lombard's Sentences and William of Auxerre's Summa aurea, as well as the Summa Fratris Alexandri, the argumentation is innovative. Philip's aim is to outline the ontological identity between the One and the Good, using the first translations of Aristotle's natural and metaphysical writings, while at the same time following the Platonic-Augustinian tradition. Philip proposed an interesting comparison between the Good, Being, and the True, which became the effective leitmotif of his work. The Summa de bono is divided in four sections. First, Philip discusses the nature of the Good in general, focusing his attention on the relationship between the highest good and the created goods. Second, he considers the natural good, describing the properties of the angels and the human beings. Third, Philip evaluates what he calls bonum in genere. Finally he focuses his attention on the bonum gratiae. By describing the graces that pertain to human beings, Philip assesses both the theological virtues (faith, hope, and charity) and the cardinal virtues (prudence, justice, fortitude, and temperance).

== Bibliography ==
=== Works ===
- Philippi Cancellari Parisiensis, Summa De Bono, Ad fidem codicum primum edita studio et cura Nicolai Wicki, Bern, Francke, 1985.

=== Studies ===
- Jan A. Aertsen, Medieval Philosophy as Transcendental Thought. From Philip the Chancellor (ca. 1225) to Francisco Suárez, Leiden, Brill, 2012.
- Ayelet Even-Ezra, Ecstasy in the Classroom: Trance, Self and the Academic Profession in Medieval Paris (Fordham University Press: NY, 2018).
