= Johannes Cotto =

Music theorist (fl. 1100)

Johannes Cotto (John Cotton, Johannes Afflighemensis; fl. c. 1100) was a music theorist, possibly of English origin, most likely working in southern Germany or Switzerland. He wrote one of the most influential treatises on music of the Middle Ages, De musica, first printed by Gerbert in 1784. The treatise included unusually precise directions for composing chant and organum.

== Life ==
Next to nothing is known about his life; indeed his identity has been a matter of controversy among scholars. Formerly it was thought he was from Lorraine or Flanders, based on a dedication he made in his treatise, but other more recent evidence suggests that he may have been a John Cotton from England who worked under an abbot named Fulgentius at or near St. Gallen (in modern Switzerland). Some of the more compelling evidence includes his knowledge of chant peculiarities of that region, notational idiosyncrasies found only in southern Germany, and his use of the old Greek modal names such as Phrygian and Mixolydian, something which was mainly done in Germany.

== Works and influence ==
His De musica was one of the most widely copied and distributed music treatises of the medieval period, with some copies appearing even after 1400. Most likely it was written around 1100, and its comments, examples, and suggestions correspond closely with the music of the contemporary St. Martial school and Codex Calixtinus, as well as the material in the treatise Ad organum faciendum (also known as the "Milan Treatise") from about the same time.

De musica consists of twenty-seven chapters, and covers a wide range of musical topics. Unlike many medieval treatises, it largely avoids metaphysical speculations, instead functioning as a practical guide for a working musician. Much of the source material is from Guido of Arezzo, Boethius, Odo of Cluny, Isidore of Seville, and Hermannus Contractus.

After chapters on 'litterae' (letter notation), monochord, nine 'consonant' intervals (unison, semitone, whole tone, ditone, semiditone, diatessaron, diapente, semitone-plus-diapente, whole-tone-plus-diapente), the Perfect System (systema teleion) of Greeks, musical modes (including a chapter on their ethos), and the composition of chant, the treatise includes one chapter most of interest to contemporary scholars: a detailed description of how to compose organum. Most of his examples are note-against-note, and demonstrate how to end on a fifth or an octave by good voice-leading; he emphasizes the importance of contrary motion, a practice which differed from the parallel organum of the preceding centuries (though it probably reflected a current practice; in the absence of many surviving 11th-century manuscripts it is difficult to date when the switch from mostly parallel to mostly contrary motion occurred).

One short passage in De musica which has attracted much attention is his description of organum sung with several notes in the organal voice versus one note in the underlying chant, one of the earliest examples of polyphony escaping from the straitjacket of single note against single note.

Johannes may have been a composer, though no music attributed to him has survived. His directions for composing melody, with their careful and practical instructions involving pacing, position of high and low notes, and use of recognizable figurations at different pitch levels seem to imply that he may have had some experience himself.

=== Manuscripts ===
There are two manuscripts at Vienna, and one each at Leipzig, Paris, Rome, and Antwerp. A sixth, from which Gerbert printed his edition, was destroyed in the fire at St. Blaise Abbey in 1768. The Vatican copy is said by Fétis to contain much of the best text. The exact date of the treatise is unknown. The Vienna and St. Blaise copies entitle it merely "Joannis Musica", while the Paris and Antwerp copies have the name of Cotton or Cottonius. The anonymous monk of Melk Abbey who copied the work, says that there was a learned English musician known as Joannes, and the English origin of the work is rendered more probable by the author's dedicating it "Domino et patri suo venerabili Anglorum antistiti Fulgentio," though the latter, like Cotton, cannot be identified. One theory attributes the work to Pope John XXII, but this rests on the very slight foundation that the author styles himself "Joannes servus servorum Dei."

Gerbert has pointed out that this title was not solely used by popes, and it seems unlikely that a pope would address a bishop with deference. The work is also clearly of earlier date, for it speaks of neums being in ordinary use at the time of writing. Another theory ascribes it to a certain "Joannes Scolasticus", a monk of St. Matthias' Abbey at Trier, all that is known of whom is that he was living about 1047, and that he wrote much music, but there seems to be no reason why the work should not have been written by the unknown Englishman, John Cotton. From internal evidence its date appears to be the latter part of the 11th or beginning of the 12th century. The work throws much light on the system of harmony of the period.
