= De Mensurabili Musica =

13th-century musical treatise

De Mensurabili Musica (concerning measured music) is a musical treatise from the early 13th century (medieval period, c. 1240) and is the first of two treatises traditionally attributed to French music theorist Johannes de Garlandia; the other is de plana musica (Concerning Plainchant). De Mensurabili Musica was the first to explain a modal rhythmic system that was already in use at the time: the rhythmic modes. The six rhythmic modes set out by the treatise are all in triple time and are made from combinations of the note values longa (long) and brevis (short) and are given the names trochee, iamb, dactyl, anapest, spondaic and tribrach, although trochee, dactyl and spondaic were much more common. It is evident how influential Garlandia's treatise has been by the number of theorists that have used its ideas. Much of the surviving music of the Notre Dame School from the 13th century is based on the rhythmic modes set out in De Mensurabili Musica.

== Sources ==
[B] Bruges, Ms. 528, f. 54v-59v

[P] Paris, Bibliothèque Nationale, Latin 16663, f. 66v-76v

[V] Biblioteca Apostolica Vaticana, Vat.lat.5325, f. 12v-30v
