= Walter Odington =

14th-century English scientist and author

Walter Odington (also known as Walter of Evesham) was a 14th-century English Benedictine scientific author, most prominent for his work on musical theory.

During the first part of his religious life he was stationed at Evesham and later removed to Oxford, where he was engaged in astronomical and mathematical work as early as 1316.

== Writings ==
Odington wrote chiefly on scientific subjects, with most of his works existing only in manuscript form. His major treatise, De speculatione musice, which Hugo Riemann says was written before 1300, was first published in complete form in Edmond de Coussemaker's Scriptores. In this work, he compiles most of the existing musical theory of his day, as well as some additions of his own.

Among Odington's own additions is his theory that, in practice, musicians often favour simple, just tuning of imperfect consonances, such as the major third, over the traditionally held Pythagorean tuning, which was the predominant theoretical framework. For example, he writes:

Verumtamen quia vicinae sunt sesquiquartae et sesquiquintae habitudinibus...iccirco plurimos estimant consonas esse. Et si in numeris non reperiantur consoni, voces tamen hominum sua subtilitate ipsos ducunt in mixturam suavem...
Nevertheless, on account of their [the Pythagorean tunings of the major and minor thirds] being neighbours to 5:4 and 6:5...very many people therefore deem them to be consonances. And if they are not found to be consonant in number, human voices, by their own subtlety, nevertheless lead themselves into pleasant mixture...

Riemann credits Odington with theoretically establishing the consonance of minor and major thirds before the end of the thirteenth century.

Henry Davey, in his History of English Music, enumerates the following works:

- De Speculatione Musices
- Ycocedron, a treatise on alchemy
- Declaratio motus octavæ spheræ
- Tractatus de multiplicatione specierum in visu secundum omnem modum
- Ars metrica
- Liber quintus geometriæ per numeros loco quantitatum
- a calendar for Evesham Abbey

Elina G. Hamilton, however, has argued that the music theorist and alchemist were two different men, the latter coming from Eynsham abbey.
