= Franco of Cologne =

German music theorist (13th-century)

Franco of Cologne (fl. mid to late 13th century; also Franco of Paris) was a German music theorist, possibly a composer, one of the most influential theorists of the Late Middle Ages, and was the first to propose an idea which was to transform musical notation permanently: that the duration of any note should be determined by its appearance on the page, and not from context alone. The result was Franconian notation, described most famously in his Ars cantus mensurabilis.

== Life ==
Some details are known about his life, and more can be inferred. In his own treatise he described himself as the papal chaplain and the preceptor of the Knights Hospitallers of St. John at Cologne, an extremely powerful position in northern Europe in the 13th century. Other documents of the time refer to him as "Franco of Paris" as well as "Franco teutonicus"; since his writing on music is intimately associated with the Notre Dame school of Paris, and his Teutonic origin is mentioned in several sources, he was probably German, probably traveled between Cologne and Paris, which had close relations during that time, and probably had a musical position at Notre Dame at some point, perhaps as a teacher, composer or singing master.

Jacques of Liège, in his early 14th century Speculum musice, a passionate defense of the 13th century ars antiqua style against the new "dissolute and lascivious" ars nova style, mentioned hearing a composition by Franco of Cologne, a motet in three voices. No music of Franco with reliable attribution has survived, although some works of the late 13th century, from Parisian sources but stylistically resembling German music of the time, have on occasion been attributed to him.

== Writings ==
Franco's most famous work was his Ars cantus mensurabilis, a work which was widely circulated and copied, and remained influential for at least 200 years. Unlike many theoretical treatises of the 13th century, it was a practical guide, and entirely avoided metaphysical speculations; it was evidently written for musicians, and was full of musical examples for each point made in the text.

The topics covered in the treatise include organum, discant, polyphony, clausulae, conductus, and indeed all the compositional techniques of the 13th century Notre Dame school. The rhythmic modes are described in detail, although Franco has a different numbering scheme for the modes than does the anonymous treatise De mensurabili musica on the rhythmic modes, written not long before. (This treatise was once attributed to Johannes de Garlandia, but scholarship beginning in the 1980s determined that Garlandia edited an anonymous manuscript late in the 13th century.)

The central part of Franco's treatise, and by far the most famous, is his suggestion that the notes themselves can define their own durations. Formerly, under the system of the rhythmic modes, rhythms were based on context: a stream of similar-appearing notes on the page would be interpreted as a series of long and short values by a trained singer based on a complex series of learned rules. While the old system was to remain largely in place for decades longer, under Franco's method the notes acquired new shapes indicating their duration. From the evidence of the spread of his treatise and the writings of later scholars, this innovation seems to have been received well; then again Franco was a papal chaplain and a preceptor of a large body of knights, and the acceptance of the method may have had little to do with democracy.

The consensus date of most medieval music theory scholars on the Ars cantus mensurabilis is about 1250. The De mensurabili musica dates from about 1240, not long before; clearly the mid-13th century was a time of progress in music notation and theory, even if it were only catching up with the current state of composition and performance.

The composer who most notably followed Franco's treatise in his own music was Petrus de Cruce, one of the most prominent composers of motets of the late ars antiqua, and one of the few whose name has been preserved; many of the surviving works are anonymous.

== The Franconian Motet ==
The Franconian Motet was named after Franco of Cologne. These motets, composed around 1250–1280, differed from the earlier Notre Dame motets in that they did not use the rhythmic modes, the triplum was more subdivided, and the multiple texts could also be in multiple languages. An example of a Franconian Motet is Amours mi font/En mai/Flos filius eius.

== Editions ==
- Franco of Cologne (1974). Reaney, Gilbert; Gilles, André (eds.). Franconis de Colonia Ars cantus mensurabilis. Corpus mensurabilis musicae. Cambridge: American Institute of Musicology. OCLC 55555076. volume 18
- —— (1998). "Franco of Cologne: Ars cantus mensurabilis". In McKinnon, James (ed.). Source Readings in Music History. Vol. 2: The early Christian period and the Latin Middle Ages. Translated by Strunk, Oliver. Revised by James McKinnon. New York: W. W. Norton & Company. pp. 116–135. ISBN 978-0-393-96695-4.

== Sources ==
- Hughes, Andrew (2001). "Franco of Cologne". Grove Music Online. Oxford: Oxford University Press. doi:10.1093/gmo/9781561592630.article.10138. ISBN 978-1-56159-263-0. (subscription, Wikilibrary access, or UK public library membership required)
