= Mensural notation =

Musical notation system used for Renaissance vocal polyphony

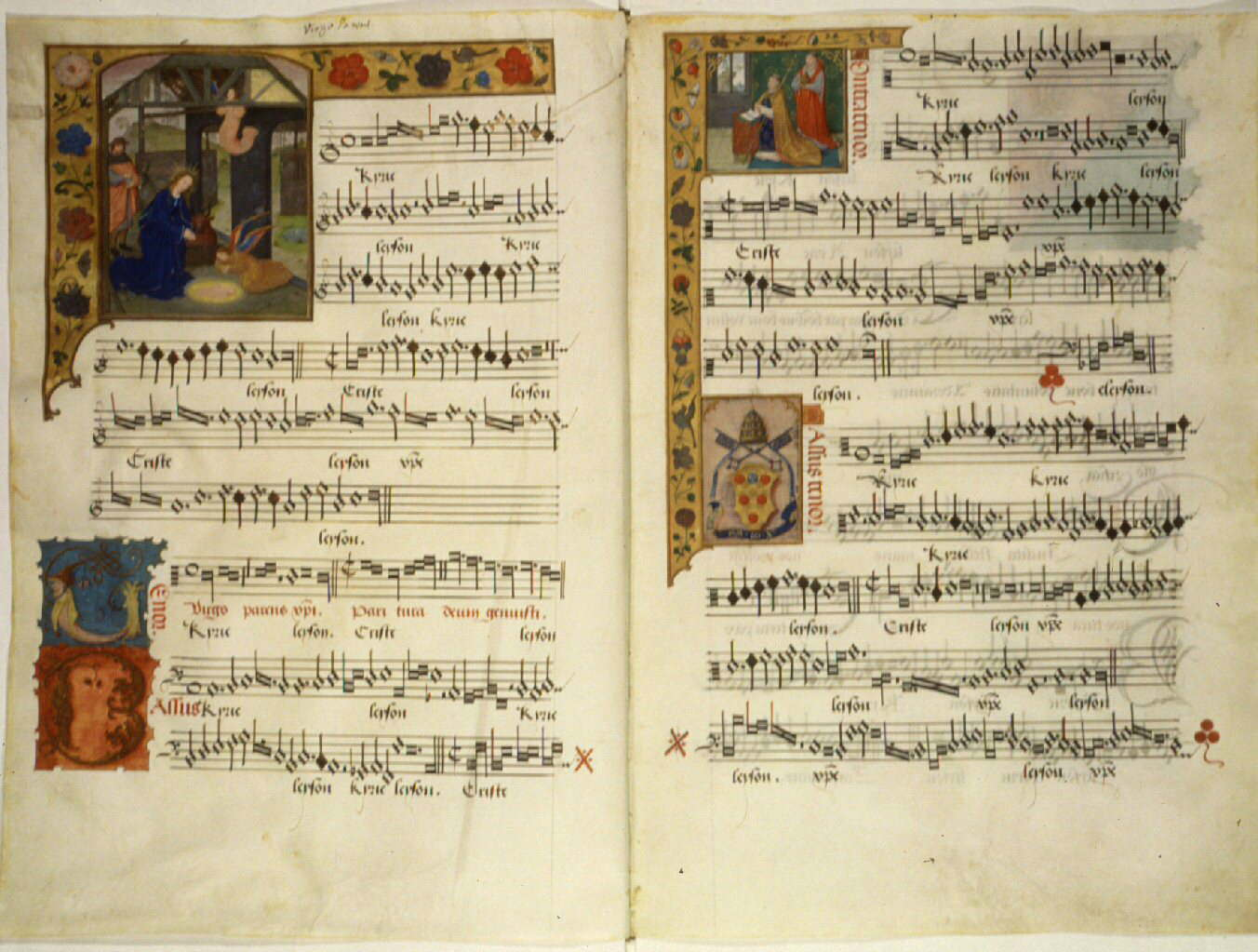
Manuscript choirbook (Capp. Sist. 160, 1510's) in mensural notation, showing the opening of Missa Virgo Parens Christi by J. Barbireau

Upper voice of the "Christe eleison" part of Barbireau's Kyrie (cf. lines 4–6 of the lefthand page), in mensural notation and modern transcription

Mensural notation is the musical notation system used for polyphonic European vocal music from the late 13th century until the early 17th century. The term "mensural" refers to the notation of precise rhythmic durations based on numerical proportions of note values. Its modern name is derived from the terminology of medieval theorists, who used terms like musica mensurata ("measured music") or cantus mensurabilis ("measurable song") to refer to the rhythmically defined polyphonic music of their age, as opposed to musica plana or musica choralis, i.e., Gregorian plainchant. Mensural notation was employed principally for polyphonic vocal music, while plainchant retained the older system of neume notation throughout the period, and some instrumental music was written in various forms of instrument-specific tablature notation.

Mensural notation grew out of an earlier, more limited method of notating rhythms in terms of fixed repetitive patterns, called rhythmic modes, which were developed in France around 1200. An early form of mensural notation was described and codified in the treatise Ars cantus mensurabilis ("The art of measured chant") by Franco of Cologne (c. 1280). An expanded system allowing for greater rhythmic complexity was introduced in France with the stylistic movement of the Ars nova in the 14th century, while Italian 14th-century music developed its own, somewhat different variant. Around 1400, the French system was adopted across Europe and became the standard form of notation for 15th- and 16th-century Renaissance music. Over the course of the 17th century, mensural notation gradually evolved into modern measure (or bar) notation.

The salient innovation of mensural notation was the systematic use of different note shapes for rhythmic durations, used in well-defined, hierarchical numerical relations to each other. This made note lengths less context-dependent than in the earlier rhythmic mode notation, but a note's length could be equal to either two or three units of the next smallest order. In modern notation, each type of note is equal to two units of the next smallest one, regardless of context. A note in mensural notation could be read as ternary ("perfect") or binary ("imperfect"), depending on rules of context and also on a system of mensuration signs comparable to modern time signatures. There was also a complex system of temporarily shifting note values by proportions such as 2:1 or 3:2. Mensural notation used no bar lines, and sometimes employed special connected note forms (ligatures) inherited from earlier medieval notation. Unlike in very early polyphonic music notation, and unlike in modern practice, mensural notation was not usually written in a musical score format, but rather in individual parts.

Mensural notation was extensively described and codified by contemporary theorists. As these writings, like all academic work of the time, were usually in Latin, many features of the system are still conventionally referred to by their Latin terms.

== Note values ==
Note values
Name		Century		
Name		13th, 14th	15th	17th
Maxima	Mx	elongated black rectangle with a descending stroke on the right	elongated hollow rectangle with a descending stroke on the right	
Longa	L	black square with a descending stroke on the right	hollow square with a descending stroke on the right	
Brevis	B	black square	hollow square	hollow ellipsis with straight vertical strokes on the side
Semibrevis	Sb	black lozenge	hollow lozenge	hollow ellipsis
Minima	Mn	black lozenge with upward stem	hollow lozenge with upward stem	hollow ellipsis with upward stem
Semiminima	Sm	black lozenge with upward stem and flag	black lozenge with upward stem hollow lozenge with upward stem and flag	black ellipsis with upward stem
Fusa	F	black lozenge with upward stem and double flag	black lozenge with upward stem and single flag hollow lozenge with upward stem and double flag	black ellipsis with upward stem and single flag
Semifusa	Sf		black lozenge with upward stem and double flag	black ellipsis with upward stem and double flag

The system of note types used in mensural notation closely corresponds to the modern system. The mensural brevis is nominally the ancestor of the modern double whole note (breve); likewise, the semibrevis corresponds to the whole note (semibreve), the minima to the half note (minim), the semiminima to the quarter note (crotchet), and the fusa to the eighth note (quaver). Very rarely, mensural notation also used yet smaller subdivisions, such as the semifusa (corresponding to the sixteenth note or semiquaver). There were also two larger values, the longa (quadruple whole note or long) and the maxima (or duplex longa, called a large in Britain), which are no longer in regular use today.

Despite these nominal equivalences, each note had a much shorter temporal value than its modern counterpart. Between the 14th and 16th centuries, composers repeatedly introduced new note shapes for ever smaller temporal divisions of rhythm, and the older, longer notes were slowed down in proportion. The basic metrical relationship of a long to a short beat shifted from longa–breve in the 13th century, to breve–semibreve in the 14th, to semibreve–minim by the end of the 15th, and finally to minim–semiminim (i.e., half and quarter notes, or minim and crotchet) in modern notation. Thus, what was originally the shortest of all note values used, the semibreve, has become the longest note used routinely today, the whole note.

Originally, all notes were written in solid, filled-in form ("black notation"). In the mid-15th century, scribes began to use hollow note shapes ("white notation"), reserving black shapes only for the smallest note values. This change was probably motivated by the change from parchment to paper for the most common writing material, as paper was less suited to holding large dots of ink.

=== Rests ===
Rests
Value	Mensural	Modern
Mx	or	two black blocks each across two staff spaces
L	or	black block across two staff spaces
B	single vertical stroke across one staff space	black block of one staff space height
Sb	single vertical stroke across upper half of one staff space	black rectangle in upper half of staff space
Mn	single vertical stroke across lower half of one staff space	black rectangle in lower half of staff space
Sm	small hook pointing to the right	modern quarter rest
F	small hook pointing to the left	short vertical stroke with flag to the left
Sf	small hook with two strokes to the left	short vertical stroke with double flag to the left

As with the notes, the shapes of the rest symbols in mensural notation are already similar to their modern descendants (with the smaller values being successively introduced in the course of the period of mensural notation). The rest symbols of the larger values had a clear visual logic reflecting their time durations, based on the breve rest being a vertical stroke the length of one staff space. For the longa rests, a visual distinction was made depending on whether the longa was imperfect (two breves long) or perfect. Accordingly, their signs were visually twice or three times the length of a breve rest respectively, while the semibreve rest was half that length. Maxima rests, in turn, were groups of two or three longa rests combined. If several longa rests followed each other, groups of either two or three of them were written together on the same staff line to indicate whether they were supposed to be grouped into perfect or imperfect maxima units. (The modern forms of the maxima and longa rests refer to their use in traditional multimeasure rests.)

=== Ligatures ===
Binary ligatures
value	proprietas perfectio	desc.	asc.
B–L	cum propr. cum perf.		
L–L	sine propr. cum perf.		
B–B	cum propr. sine perf.		
L–B	sine propr. sine perf.		
Sb–Sb	cum opposita prop.		

Generalized ligature rules
final L
final B
initial L
initial B
non-final L
Maxima

Ligatures are groups of notes written together, usually indicating melismatic singing of the same syllable over several notes. Ligature forms exist only for the larger note values from the semibreve upwards. Their use in mensural notation was a holdover from the earlier modal rhythmic system, of which they inherited some of their rhythmic meaning.

The rhythmic values of ligatures in modal notation had been based on a metric reinterpretation of the ligature neumes used since much earlier in the notation of Gregorian plainchant. In modal notation, ligatures represented stereotyped rhythmic sequences of short and long notes, typically involving groups of one or more initial short notes (i.e., breves) and one final long note (i.e., a longa). In mensural notation, this rule was generalized, with all other rhythmic combinations being classified in terms of deviation from this basic pattern. In medieval terminology, a ligature possessed perfectio ("perfection") if its final note was a longa (L), and it had proprietas ("propriety") if its first note was a breve (B).

Accordingly, a note pair of B–L (cum proprietate et cum perfectione) could be written with the most basic of ligature shapes, those inherited from plainchant, namely the descending clivis and the ascending podatus. Likewise, three-note groups of B–B–L could be written with some of the inherited ternary neumes, such as the porrectus (direction down–up), the torculus (direction up–down), or the scandicus (direction up–up).

If, by way of exception, the first note was to be a longa (sine proprietate), this was indicated by a reversal of initial stems: the descending clivis had its downward stem removed, while, conversely, the ascending podatus had one added to it ( or).

On the other hand, if the final note was to be a breve (sine perfectione), this was signaled by a change in the noteheads themselves: the descending sequence of square heads was replaced with a single diagonal beam, while the ascending podatus had its second note unfolded to the right. Both sequences correspond to the initial B–B segments of the ternary porrectus and torculus respectively.

If both exceptions concurred (sine proprietate et sine perfectione), the corresponding alterations were combined.

In addition to sequences of longa and breve, ligatures could also begin with pairs of semibreves (but not normally a single one). These were called cum opposita proprietate, and always marked by an upward-pointing stem to the left of the note pair.

There were also some alternate versions of the ascending ligatures. Thus, the basic ascending B–L podatus shape was replaced by one where the second note was both folded out to the right and marked with an extra stem, as if these two modifications were meant to cancel each other out. The ascending L–L (sine proprietate) was modified accordingly.

Ligatures could contain any number of notes. In multi-note ligatures, the rules about initial and final values are applied in analogy to those in the binary forms. In addition, the following rules hold for notes in all positions:

- Any notehead with an upward stem to its left is the first of a pair of semibreves (cum opposita proprietate).
- Any medial notehead with a downward stem to its right is a longa.
- A prolonged, double-width notehead with or without a downward stem to its right is a maxima.
- Any other notehead not covered by any of the rules above is a breve.

A line of early 15th-century music notated all in ligatures, showing several multi-note combinations. Semibreves highlighted in blue, breves in red, longae in green. Below, the same music rewritten in stand-alone notes.

== Mensurations ==
Mensurations
	Ternary	Binary
Maximodus	perfectus 1 Mx = 3 L	imperfectus 1 Mx = 2 L
Modus	perfectus 1 L = 3 B	imperfectus 1 L = 2 B
Tempus	perfectum 1 B = 3 Sb	imperfectum 1 B = 2 Sb
Prolatio	maior 1 Sb = 3 Mn	minor 1 Sb = 2 Mn

Mensural notation distinguished between several basic metric patterns of a piece of music, which were defined as combinations of ternary and binary subdivisions of time on successive hierarchical levels and roughly correspond to modern bar structures. The division of the semibreve into minims was called prolatio, that of the breve into semibreves was called tempus, and that of the longa into breves was known as modus. The division of the maxima into longas was called modus maximarum or modus maior; in the modern literature it is also sometimes called maximodus. Each of these levels could be either perfect (ternary) or imperfect (binary). The two types of prolatio were also known as "major prolation" and "minor prolation" respectively.

Mensuration signs
Tempus	Prolatio	Sign	Semibreves	Minims	Modern		
Tempus	Prolatio	Sign	Semibreves	Minims	1:4	1:2	1:1
perfectum	maior	Circle with dot	three semibreves	three groups of three minims	9/8	9/4	9/2
perfectum	minor	Circle without dot	three semibreves	three groups of two minims	3/4	3/2	3/1
imperfectum	maior	Semicircle with dot	two semibreves	two groups of three minims	6/8	6/4	6/2
imperfectum	minor	Semicircle without dot	two semibreves	four minims	2/4	2/2	2/1

The perfect modus and maximodus became rare in practice after the 14th century. Of most practical importance were the subdivisions from the breve downwards, as by that time the semibreves rather than the breves had taken over the function of the basic counting unit. The four possible combinations of tempus and prolatio could be signaled by a set of mensuration signs at the beginning of a composition: a circle for tempus perfectum, a semicircle for tempus imperfectum, each combined with a dot for prolatio maior, or no dot for prolatio minor. These correspond to modern measures of 9/8, 3/4, 6/8, and 2/4 respectively (assuming a reduction factor of 1:4 in transcription, i.e., mapping mensural minims to modern quavers), or alternatively 9/4, 3/2, 6/4 and 2/2 respectively (with a reduction factor of 1:2). In each case, one breve corresponds to one modern bar. In addition, each of these basic patterns had a diminished (diminutum) variant, indicated by a vertical stroke through the sign. These so-called "cut signs" indicated a reduction of all temporal values by a factor of two. (The signs and are the source of the modern "common time" and "alla breve" signatures and respectively.) A reversed semicircle was usually understood to be the same as.

There were normally no special signs for indicating the higher divisions of modus and maximodus. However, groups of longa rests at the beginning of a piece (which occurred frequently, as often some voices in a polyphonic composition would enter later than others) could be used as an indicator of the intended meter. If longa rests were written across three staff spaces, they were perfect; moreover, if they occurred in groups of three written together on the same staff line they indicated perfect maximodus. Occasionally, if no voice happened to have a sufficiently long rest at the beginning of the piece, a dummy rest symbol of one maxima's worth of longae would be written to the left of the mensuration sign; in that case it was understood as part of the time signature and not actually executed as a rest.

== Imperfection and alteration ==
The time value of some notes could change according to their immediate context in certain situations. The rules for this were developed on the basis of the typical rhythmic nature of music in the 13th century. Most music at that time followed the same basic metric pattern, which in modern notation would be written as a swift 6/4 (or 6/8) meter. Thus, melodies consisted mainly of ternary long notes (in modern notation, dotted minims), or alternating sequences of binary long notes and short notes (minims and crotchets), or groups of three short notes. In the 13th century, all of these were notated using only the longa and breve notes. A longa was automatically understood to fill a whole ternary metric group whenever it was in the neighborhood of other notes that did the same, i.e., whenever it was followed either by another longa or by a full group of three breves. When, however, the longa was preceded or followed by a single breve, then both filled a ternary group together. Thus, the longa had to be reduced to a value of two (it was "imperfected"). When, finally, there were only two breves in between two longae, then the two breves had to fill up a metrical group together. This was done by lengthening the second breve (brevis altera) to a value of two, while the first (brevis recta) kept its normal value.

The 13th-century English round "Sumer is icumen in", written in an early form of mensural notation and in the 6/4 meter typical of that era. It is written mostly in longa and breve notes. Longa notes highlighted in red are perfect, the others imperfect. The two breves in m. 22 would normally imply alteration (s-l), but harmonic considerations lead most editors to assume the scribe simply forgot to add a stem to the first note.

Imperfection and alteration
a)
b)
c)
d)
e)
f)
g)
h)
i)
j)
k)
l)
m)

Upper voice of "Ave Regina" by Guillaume Dufay, a mid-15th century piece in largely homophonic tempus perfectum. Arrows are added to indicate imperfection of breves by subsequent semibreves and alteration in pairs of semibreves. Breves marked with a blue cross are perfect. Note the separator dots in the second line, enforcing a syncopated rhythm on the Sb groups. (Full score;)

At the earliest stage, this basic principle applied only to the relation between longa and breve. Beginning with Franco of Cologne, the same pattern was also applied between breves and semibreves, and finally, with Philippe de Vitry's theory of the Ars nova, it was taken yet another level down, to the newly introduced minims. From that time onwards, imperfection and alteration could happen on the level of breves and semibreves whenever the piece was in tempus perfectum, and it could happen between semibreves and minims if the piece was in prolatio maior. The divisions below the minim were invariably binary. Theorists developed an intricate set of precedence rules for when and how to apply imperfection, together with a complex terminology for its different types.

Normally, a note was imperfected by one of the next smaller order, e.g., a breve (B) by a semibreve (Sb), and thereby lost one third of its own nominal value (ex. [a–c]). This was called "full imperfection" (imperfectio ad totum). It could be induced either backwards (a parte post), or forwards (a parte ante, ex. [c]). If both readings were possible, backwards imperfection took precedence. The smaller unit could also be replaced by a group of yet smaller notes of equivalent length, e.g., a semibreve's worth of minims or semiminims (ex. [d]). Imperfection could also apply recursively, for instance with an Sb imperfecting a preceding B and being itself imperfected by a following minim (ex. [e]), if the meter was suitable (e.g., tempus perfectum and prolatio maior).

Imperfection typically occurred if two larger notes were separated by a single smaller unit, as in a sequence of B–Sb–B–Sb. If, however, they were separated by a group of either two or three of the smaller units, there was no imperfection: in the case of two, alteration was applied instead (ex. [f]); while in the case of three the group was simply left to fill the space of a perfect unit by themselves (ex. [g]). If, in turn, there was a longer sequence of four or more smaller units before the next longer value, then the first of them induced imperfection (ex. [h]). Imperfection was barred on any note that was followed directly by another of the same order (similis ante similem perfecta). Thus, the middle part of a sequence like could only be written using alteration (as shown in ex.[f]); the use of imperfection like in ex.(c) was excluded, because the presence of the subsequent breve blocked it.

The normal reading of the groups could be overridden by placing a separator dot (punctus divisionis) between the notes to indicate which of them were meant to form a ternary unit together (ex. [i]). If the separator dot was placed after a potentially ternary note (e.g., a breve in tempus perfectum), it typically had the effect of keeping it perfect, i.e., overriding an imperfection that would otherwise have applied to it. In these cases it was also called punctus perfectionis. Besides this, a dot could also be used in the same way as today: when it was placed after a note that was nominally binary (e.g., a breve in tempus imperfectum), it augmented it by one half (punctus augmentationis).

In some situations, imperfection could be induced not by a note of the next smaller order but by an even smaller one. For instance, a breve in prolatio maior, which could be thought of as being composed of two perfect semibreves, could be imperfected by an adjacent minim, taking away one third of one of its two halves, thus reducing its total length from 6 to 5 (ex.[j]). This was called "partial imperfection" (imperfectio ad partem). Imperfection involving note values two orders apart (e.g., a breve by a minim, or a longa by a semibreve) was called "imperfection of an immediate part" (ad partem propinquam); while the (rarer) case where it occurred across even greater distances (e.g., between a longa and a minim) was known as "imperfection of a remote part" (ad partem remotam, ex. [k]). Finally, partial imperfection could also apply from both sides of a long note at once (ad partes, ex [l–m]). In this way, a note that was nominally 9 beats long could be reduced to any value down to 4, or a note that was 12 beats long to any value down to 7.

Rests, unlike notes, had an invariable duration and could not be imperfected or altered; however, they could induce imperfection or alteration on a neighboring note.

== Proportions and colorations ==
An individual composition was not limited to a single set of tempus and prolatio. Meters could be shifted in the course of a piece, either by inserting a new mensuration sign, or by using numeric proportions. A "3" indicates that all notes will be reduced to one-third of their value; a "2" indicates double tempo; a fraction "3/2" indicates three in the time of two, and so forth. The proportion 2 is usually understood to have the same effect as the use of a cut sign with a vertical stroke ( =).

The use of numeric proportions can interact with the use of different basic mensurations in fairly complex ways. This has led to a certain amount of uncertainty and controversy over the correct interpretation of these notation devices, both in contemporary theory and in modern scholarship.

Coloration
a)
b)
c)
d)

Another way of altering the metrical value of notes was coloration. This refers to the device of literally marking a note as rhythmically exceptional by writing it in a different color. In the earlier period, when normal notes were black, the exceptional ones were written in red, or sometimes hollow. In the later period, the practice was reversed; as the normal notes were now hollow, the exceptional ones were filled out in black. In either case, "colored" notes are understood to have 2/3 of their normal duration, and are always imperfect with respect to their next smaller sub-divisions.

Coloration applied to a group of breves (ex. [a]) was known as color temporis, while that of a group of semibreves (ex. [b–c]) was called color prolationis. The resulting rhythmic effect, as expressed in modern notation, differs somewhat according to whether the affected notes were normally perfect or imperfect according to the basic mensuration of the music. Applied to perfect notes (ex. [a–b]), coloration creates the effect of a hemiola: three binary rhythmic groups in the space normally taken up by two ternary ones, but with the next smaller time units (semibreves in [a], minims in [b]) remaining constant. When applied to notes that were already imperfect according to their normal values (ex. [c]), coloration results in the effect of a group of triplets, with all rhythmic units reduced by two thirds. Another special form of coloration was that applied to a group of a single semibreve and a following minim, called minor color (ex. [d]). Whereas it would logically be expected to result in a triplet group, it was instead conventionally executed as a dotted group equivalent to a dotted minim and a semiminim (note that in the context of white notation, the colored – i.e., blackened – version of the minim in the minor color group happened to look just like a normal semiminim anyway, even though nominally it was considered a different type of note.)

The use of colored notes (at that time written in red) was introduced by Philippe de Vitry and flourished in the so-called ars subtilior of the late 14th century.

B. Cordier, "Belle bonne sage"	Upper voice, as written in the original
B. Cordier, "Belle bonne sage"	Upper voice, transcribed. (Full score;)

The example above, the chanson "Belle, bonne, sage" by Baude Cordier, written in a heart-shaped manuscript, is a rhythmically complex piece of ars subtilior. It uses several notation techniques for shifting between rhythms:

- red notes: diminution 2/3
- shift to prolatio maior: here with implied augmentation minim→semibreve
- white notes: diminution 1/2 (two breves in the time of one)
- proportion "3": diminution 1/3
- proportion "8/9": eight notes in the time of nine notes of the preceding bar

=== Mensural canons ===
Sometimes, music was written in such a way that the same line of music had to be performed under two or more mensuration schemes, typically leading to slower (augmented) and faster (diminished) versions of the same passage. In such cases, the music was typically notated only once, and several different mensuration signs were placed in front of it together, often supplemented with a verbal instruction of how it should be executed (called a "canon").

This technique could be applied both successively and simultaneously. Successive mensural canons were a characteristic feature of late 14th and early 15th century isorhythmic motets. A famous example is Nuper rosarum flores by Guillaume Dufay, where the tenor (notated all in longa and a few breve values) is performed first as tempus perfectum (3/2), then tempus imperfectum (2/2), then tempus imperfectum diminutum (2/4), and finally tempus perfectum diminutum (3/4), leading to length relations of 6:4:2:3 between the four repetitions.

Pieces that demanded simultaneous execution of versions of the same music, i.e., contrapunctal canons, were written by several composers of the Franco-Flemish school in the late 15th and early 16th century, such as Josquin des Prez, Johannes Ockeghem or Pierre de la Rue. Ockeghem's Missa prolationum is famous for systematically exploring different ways of combining pairs of voices in mensural canons. In the example given below, from the first "Kyrie" of this mass, both upper voices sing the same notated line, one reading it as "tempus imperfectum" and the other as "tempus perfectum". The two lower voices are similarly coupled with each other. Each of the four voices thus starts the piece in a different mensuration, leading to different bar length in the modern transcription. (The lower voices, which are written in prolatio maior, later shift to a meter where all semibreves are imperfected through black coloration, which means they end up having the same length as those of the upper voices after all.)

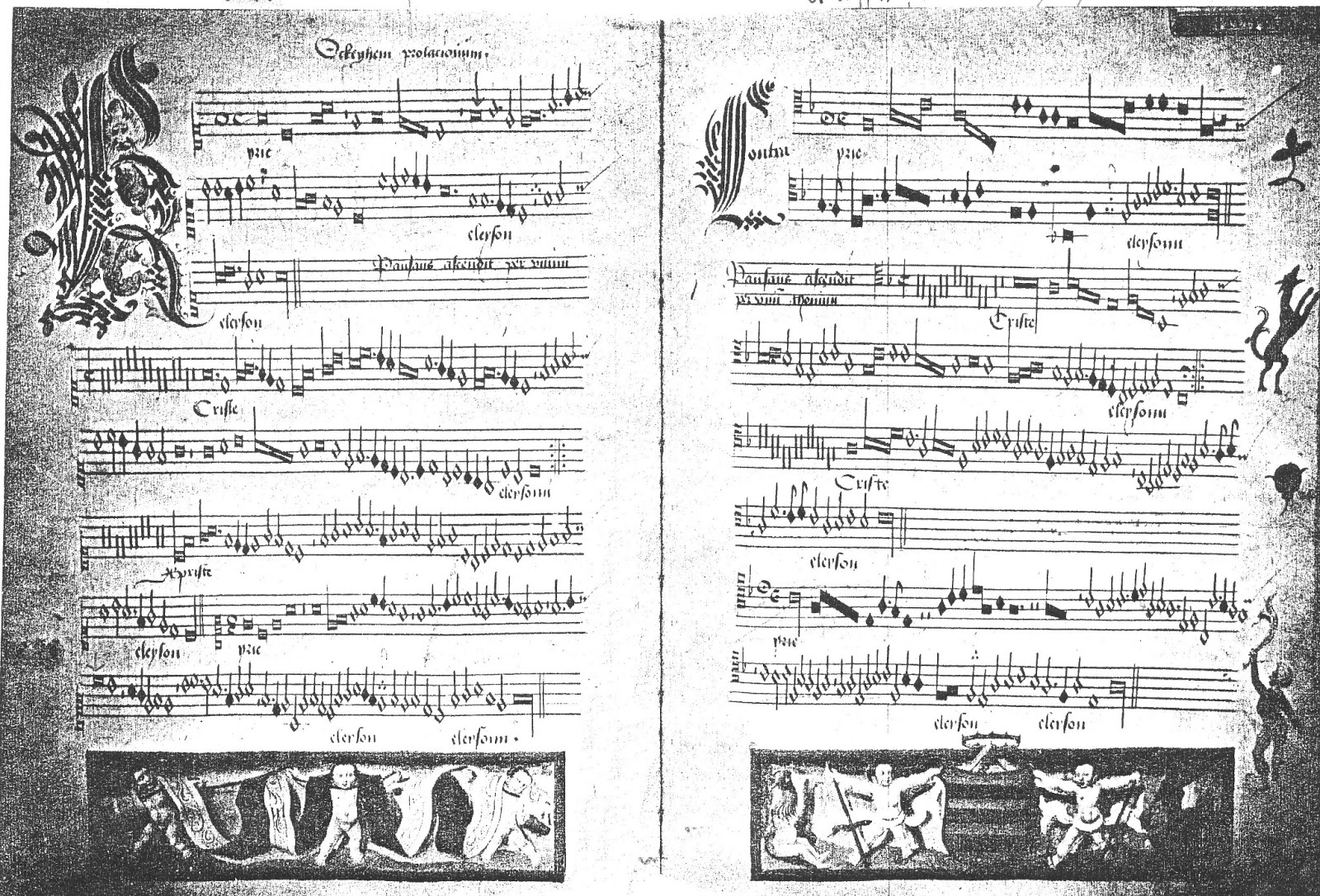
The Kyrie of Ockeghem's Missa prolationum in the Chigi codex (Chig. C. VIII 234, music09, NB.03)

The two notated parts of the first Kyrie in mensural notation

Transcription of the first few measures as realized (full score;)

== Pitch notation ==
Whereas the rules of notating rhythm in Mensural notation were in many ways different from the modern system, the notation of pitch already followed much the same principles. The use of accidentals however differs significantly from modern practice.

=== Clefs ===
Clefs and their typical voice ranges

Mensural notation generally uses C and F clefs, on various lines. G-clefs, while used infrequently throughout the period, did not come into completely routine use until the later 16th century. Clefs were generally chosen to match the vocal range of a given voice, so as to avoid the need of ledger lines. Since middle C lies within that range for most voices, the C-clef is the one most frequently used. For mixed voices, a typical combination of clefs would have the bass clef (F on the fourth staff line) in the lowest voice, and tenor clef, alto clef and soprano clef (middle C on the fourth, third, and first staff line respectively) in the remaining voices. An alternative arrangement, known as chiavette, had the range of each voice shifted one third up, leading to a combination of F_{3}, C_{3}, C_{2} and G_{2} clefs. The “transposed” arrangement proper had the range of each voice shifted one third down, leading to a combination of F_{5}, F_{3} or C_{5}, C_{4} and C_{2} clefs.

Clefs originally bore shapes more or less closely resembling the letter they represented, but came to develop more ornamental shapes over time. In the F-clef, the two arms of the "F" were changed into two dots sitting to the right of a vertical stem. All three elements could be further modified; in particular, they were often styled as if they were note heads. The C-clef remained a simple, often square, "C"-like shape in most manuscripts, but its arms tended to become hollow rectangles or rhomboids in later manuscripts and especially in music prints of the 16th century. The G-clef developed a curved ornamental swash typically attached to the top of the letter, which ultimately evolved into the loop shape of the modern form.

C clef
F clef
G clef

=== Accidentals ===
In Medieval and Renaissance music accidentals were often not written but left to the performer to infer according to the rules of counterpoint and musica ficta. Explicit sharps and flats apply to immediate repetitions of the pitch (there being of course no barlines) and are cancelled by rests as well as intervening notes. They may also be cancelled by contrary signs instead of naturals.

Medieval notation used two accidental signs, the "b molle" and the "b durum". While the former was identical in form to the modern flat sign (♭), the latter could be written in forms that resemble either the modern sharp (♯) or the modern natural (♮), but these functions were not distinguished from each other as they are today. The b molle served to pick out the lower of two alternative semitone steps for a given note (e.g., a B♭ as opposed to a B♮), while the b durum served to pick out the higher one (e.g., B♮ as opposed to B♭, but also F♯ as opposed to F♮, etc.). The meanings of both signs thus overlaps with that of the natural sign today.

Until the 16th century, only the flat signs regularly occurred as key signatures at the beginning of a staff (one or at most two flats). Both forms of accidentals could occur as temporary accidentals elsewhere; however, in practice they were often not written but left to the performer to infer according to the rules of counterpoint and musica ficta.

== Miscellaneous symbols ==
Mensural notation may contain a number of other symbols.

=== Custos ===
The custos, known in English as a direct symbol, (pl. custodes, from the Latin for guard) appears at the end of the staff on or between the staff lines. It indicates the pitch of the first note that occurs on the following staff that belongs to that part relative to the clef of the current staff. This helps performers to prepare to sing the next note without having to look away from the current passage (analogous to the catchword in older printed books). If the next staff for the part occurs on the following page, two custodes may appear immediately next to each other.

In the earliest manuscripts, custodes appear as thin or small notes (somewhat like modern cue notes). By around 1500 a separate sign resembling a 'w' with a long upward tail had been developed, which briefly survived into the more modern musical notation of the early Baroque period (early 17th century).

=== Corona ===
The corona appears above the last note of the piece (or section). It is similar to the fermata in modern notation. It typically appears above the last note at each part of a piece to indicate the note should be held longer that its value indicates. If it appears somewhere other than at the end of a piece, typically a short pause is expected before proceeding with the notes after the note with the corona.

=== Signum congruentiae ===
The signum congruentiae indicates the position of entry of another voice. This is used to denote canons and rounds. Instead of writing out all parts, only one part is written out. The signum congruentiae indicates the point in each part where the following part must start from the beginning.

There is some variation in the way signa congruentiae are denoted.

== History ==
The most important early stages in the historical development of mensural notation are the works of Franco of Cologne (c. 1260), Petrus de Cruce (c. 1300), and Philippe de Vitry (1322). Franco, in his Ars cantus mensurabilis, was the first to describe the relations between maxima, longa and breve in terms that were independent of the fixed patterns of earlier rhythmic modes. He also refined the use of semibreves:, while in earlier music, one breve could occasionally be replaced by two semibreves, Franco described the subdivision of the breve as ternary (perfect), dividing it either into three equal or two unequal semibreves (resulting in predominantly triplet rhythmic micro-patterns.)

Petrus de Cruce introduced subdivisions of the breve into even more short notes. However, he did not yet define these as separate smaller hierarchy levels (minim, semiminim etc.), but simply as variable numbers of semibreves. The exact rhythmic interpretation of these groups is partly uncertain. The technique of notating complex groups of short notes by sequences of multiple semibreves was later used more systematically in the notation of Italian Trecento music.

The decisive refinements that made notation even of extremely complex rhythmic patterns on multiple hierarchical metric levels possible were introduced in France during the time of the Ars nova, with Philippe de Vitry as the most important theoretician. The Ars nova introduced the shorter note values below the semibreve; it systematicized the relations of perfection and imperfection across all levels, down to the minim, and it introduced the devices of proportions and coloration.

During the time of the Franco-Flemish school in Renaissance music, use of the French notation system spread throughout Europe. This period brought the replacement of black with white notation. It also brought a further slowing of the duration of the larger note values, while introducing even more new small ones (fusa, semifusa, etc.). Toward the end of this period, the original rules of perfection and imperfection became obsolescent, as did the use of ligatures. During the 17th century, the system of mensuration signs and proportions gradually developed into the modern time signatures, and new notation devices for time measurements, such as bar lines and ties, were introduced, ultimately leading toward the modern notation system.

== Modern use ==
Beginning of a modern score of a Renaissance piece, Josquin's "Domine, ne in furore", showing the use of mensural incipits and mensurstrich layout. (Full score;)

Today, music from the mensural period is normally transcribed into modern notation for performance or study, using a modern score layout, bar lines and often a modernized choice of clefs. A number of special editorial conventions for such transcriptions are common, especially in scholarly editions, where it is desirable that the basic characteristics of the original notation should be recoverable from the modern text.

While 19th and early 20th century editions of Renaissance music often preserved the large note values of the originals, including breves and longs, most modern editions will use scaled-down note values in order to match modern reading habits regarding tempo and beat structure. For 16th century music, a frequent scheme is diminution by a factor of 2 (i.e., rendering semibreves as modern minims), in a modern alla breve bar. Older music might be diminished by a factor of 4 (rendering semibreves as crotchets) or sometimes 8 (rendering breves as crotchets). For 13th-century pieces, diminution by 16 (rendering breves as quavers) is also common. For 15th and 16th century music, bar divisions are usually chosen to match the time of a breve, while 14th century Ars nova pieces may be written in measures the length of a longa, and 13th century music in measures the length of a maxima.

To account for these editorial changes, scholarly editions often print a brief notation fragment in the original form in front of each staff at the beginning of a piece, called an "incipit", including the original clefs, mensuration signs, accidentals, and often the first few notes. Alternatively, an annotation defining the mapping scheme may be provided over the staff, e.g., "=".

Where ligatures occur in the original text, this is conventionally marked by square brackets over the transcribed notes, while the use of coloration is sometimes marked by broken brackets (⌜...⌝). Flats or sharps that are not written in the original but suggested by the editor are typically indicated by placing them above the note rather than in front of it.

A special issue in representing Renaissance music is how to deal with its characteristic free-flowing rhythms, where modern bar lines can seem to overly highlight what is part of the natural articulation points of the melodic units. To avoid the excessive use of ties and to allow for a notation more closely reflecting the original, some editions will print bar lines not across the staves, but only in the intermediate spaces between them (a convention sometimes referred to by the German term Mensurstrich), allowing notes to be read as lasting across a bar line.

For quoting mensural notation symbols in inline text, a number of characters have been included in the character encoding standard Unicode, in the "Musical Symbols" block. They are located at character codes U+1D1B6 through U+1D1CE.

Unicode	Character name	Character	Image
U+1D1B6	Musical symbol maxima	𝆶	
U+1D1B7	Musical symbol longa	𝆷	
U+1D1B8	Musical symbol brevis	𝆸	
U+1D1B9	Musical symbol semibrevis white	𝆹	
U+1D1BA	Musical symbol semibrevis black	𝆺	
U+1D1BB	Musical symbol minima	𝆹𝅥	
U+1D1BC	Musical symbol minima black	𝆺𝅥	
U+1D1BD	Musical symbol semiminima white	𝆹𝅥𝅮	
U+1D1BE	Musical symbol semiminima black	𝆺𝅥𝅮	
U+1D1BF	Musical symbol fusa white	𝆹𝅥𝅯	
U+1D1C0	Musical symbol fusa black	𝆺𝅥𝅯	
U+1D1C1	Musical symbol longa perfecta rest	𝇁	
U+1D1C2	Musical symbol longa imperfecta rest	𝇂	
U+1D1C3	Musical symbol brevis rest	𝇃	
U+1D1C4	Musical symbol semibrevis rest	𝇄	
U+1D1C5	Musical symbol minima rest	𝇅	
U+1D1C6	Musical symbol semiminima rest	𝇆	
U+1D1C7	Musical symbol tempus perfectum cum prolatione perfecta	𝇇	
U+1D1C8	Musical symbol tempus perfectum cum prolatione imperfecta	𝇈	
U+1D1C9	Musical symbol tempus perfectum cum prolatione perfecta [sic] diminution-1	𝇉	
U+1D1CA	Musical symbol tempus imperfectum cum prolatione perfecta	𝇊	
U+1D1CB	Musical symbol tempus imperfectum cum prolatione imperfecta	𝇋	
U+1D1CC	Musical symbol tempus imperfectum cum prolatione imperfecta diminution-1	𝇌	
U+1D1CD	Musical symbol tempus imperfectum cum prolatione imperfecta diminution-2	𝇍	
U+1D1CE	Musical symbol tempus imperfectum cum prolatione imperfecta diminution-3	𝇎	

== See also ==
- Musical notation
- Neumatic notation

== Notes ==
=== Sources ===
- Apel, Willi (1962). Die Notation der polyphonen Musik, 900–1600. Leipzig: Breitkopf & Härtel. [=Apel 1961, in German.]
- Apel, Willi (1970). Harvard Dictionary of Music. Taylor & Francis.
  - Apel, Willi (1970a). "Accidentals". In Apel (1970).
  - Apel, Willi (1970b). "Key signature". In Apel (1970).
- Busse Berger, Anna Maria (1993). Mensuration and Proportion Signs: Origins and Evolution. Oxford: Oxford University Press.
- Eggebrecht, Hans Heinrich (1991). Musik im Abendland: Prozesse und Stationen vom Mittelalter bis zur Gegenwart. Munich: Piper.
- Grier, James (1996). The Critical Editing of Music: History, Method and Practice. Cambridge: Cambridge University Press.
