= Jacobus of Liège =

Franco-Flemish medieval music theorist

Jacobus of Liège (died after 1330) was a music theorist active in the Southern Netherlands in the late middle ages. He compiled the largest surviving medieval treatise on music, Speculum musicae (the Mirror of Music), probably in the 1320s and 1330s.

== Life and work ==
The Speculum musicae of Jacobus was previously attributed to Jean de Muris, due to a misreading of the attribution of another treatise in its chief source, Paris, Bibliothèque nationale, MS lat. 7207, fol. 299v. Yet Jacobus incorporated his own name by means of an acrostic: the initial letters of each of the seven books of the opus spell out the name IACOBUS. In Book VI Jacobus demonstrates expert knowledge of chant practices in the diocese of Liège, and states that he had been resident in one of the churches of Liège. He also reveals that he had studied at the University of Paris, presumably in the final decades of the 13th century.

A contemporary treatise, written not long after 1376, mentions a certain Jacobus de Montibus as an expert on the genera of ancient Greek music theory. The most extensive contemporary treatment of that arcane topic is found in Book V of Speculum musicae. A canon named Jacobus de Montibus was resident in the church of Saint Paul (now cathedral) in Liège during the 1320s and 1330s.

The discovery of an attribution of the Speculum to a Iacobus de Ispania initially suggested that the author had come from Spain (Latin: Hispania), possibly identifying him with a James of Spain known to have worked in Oxford in the 14th century, and suggesting that the connection with Liège was spurious. Further research demonstrated that Ispania more likely refers to Hesbaye, an archdeaconate in the diocese of Liège known in Latin as Hispania or Hesbania.

Of the seven books of Speculum musicae, the last has received the most attention for its long argument against unnamed "moderni" (including Philippe de Vitry and Johannes de Muris), whom Jacobus held responsible for corrupting the mensural notation system as defined by Franco of Cologne.

== See also ==
- Ars nova
