= Johannes de Garlandia (music theorist) =

13th century musicologist

Johannes de Garlandia (Johannes Gallicus) (fl. c. 1270 – 1320) was a French music theorist of the late ars antiqua period of medieval music. He is known for his work on the first treatise to explore the practice of musical notation of rhythm, De Mensurabili Musica.

== Life and problems of identification ==
Until the mid-1980s it was believed that Johannes de Garlandia lived in the first half of the 13th century and wrote two treatises, De Mensurabili Musica and De plana musica, and thus was intimately connected with the composers of the Notre-Dame school, at least one of whom – Pérotin – may still have been alive in the earlier part of his career. Unfortunately the linking of his name with those two works only began after 1270, and it now seems likely that Garlandia was one Jehan de Garlandia, a keeper of a bookshop in Paris, records of whom appear on various official Parisian documents between 1296 and 1319. Most likely he was an editor of the two previous anonymous treatises, and while he did much to clarify them and transmit them to posterity, he did not write them.

Sources writing about Garlandia in the late 13th and early 14th century also call him a magister, indicating he probably had a role as a teacher at the University of Paris.

== Works ==
De mensurabili musica, most likely written around 1240, is the single most important treatise in the early history of rhythmic notation, for it is the first to propose notation of rhythm. Specifically, it describes a practice already in use, known as modal rhythm, which used the rhythmic modes. In this system, notes on the page are assigned to groups of long and short values based on their context. De mensurabili musica describes six rhythmic modes, corresponding to poetic feet: long–short (trochee), short–long (iamb), long–short–short (dactyl), short–short–long (anapest), long–long (spondee), and short–short (pyrrhic). Notation had not yet evolved to the point where the appearance of each note gave its duration; that had still to be understood from the position of a note in a phrase, which of the six rhythmic modes was being employed, and a number of other factors.

Modal rhythm is the defining rhythmic characteristic of the music of the Notre Dame school, giving it an utterly distinct sound, one which was to prevail throughout the 13th century. Usually one mode prevailed through a phrase, changing to a different mode only after a cadence. Only with the development of the music of the ars nova in the early 14th century was the regular modal rhythm to break down and be supplanted by freer rhythms, as made possible by the development of precise notation.

It is not certain how much of the treatise was written anonymously, and how much Garlandia edited it, except that Garlandia probably wrote some of the later chapters in their entirety. Franco of Cologne, writing around 1280, clearly borrowed portions of the unedited version. Garlandia's achievement was to refine and disseminate it; his position as a bookseller may have something to do with its wide distribution and influence.

== Bibliography ==
- Baltzer, Rebecca A. (2001). "Johannes de Garlandia [Johannes Gallicus]". Grove Music Online (8th ed.). Oxford University Press. doi:10.1093/gmo/9781561592630.article.14358. ISBN 978-1-56159-263-0. (subscription, Wikilibrary access, or UK public library membership required) (subscription required)
- Daolmi, Davide. "Storia della musica medioevale e rinascimentale". Temporum Stirpis Musica. Dipartimento di Beni culturali e ambientali, University of Milan.
  - Garlandia, Johannes de. "De mensurabili musica".
- Frobenius, Wolf (1970). "Zur Datierung von Francos Ars cantus mensurabilis". Archiv für Musikwissenschaft (in German). 27 (2): 122–127. doi:10.2307/930354. JSTOR 930354.
- M. Huglo: "La notation franconienne: antécédents et devenir", La notation des musiques polyphoniques aux XI–XIIIe siècles. Poitiers, 1986. (Cahiers de civilisation médiévale, xxxi/2, 1988). In French.
- Hoppin, Richard H. (1978). Medieval Music. New York: W. W. Norton. ISBN 978-0-393-09090-1 – via Internet Archive.
