= Lenino =

Lenino may refer to:

- Lenino, Astrakhan Oblast, Russia
- Lenino, Amur Oblast, Russia
- Lenino, Chekmagushevsky District, Republic of Bashkortostan
- Lenino, Lipetsk Oblast, Russia
- Lenino-Kokushkino, Tatarstan, Russia
- Lenino, Cherepovetsky District, Vologda Oblast, Russia
- Lenino, Totemsky District, Vologda Oblast
- Lenino air base, Kamchatka, Russia
- The former name of Qıraqlı, Saatly, Azerbaijan
- The alternate name of Lyenina, Mogilev Region, Belarus
- The former name of Karatobe, Almaty Region, Kazakhstan

== See also ==
- Lenine (disambiguation), the Ukrainian equivalent of the name
- Battle of Lenino, 1943
