= Viderunt omnes =

Gregorian chant

"Viderunt omnes" is a Gregorian chant based on Psalm XCVIII (98), sung as the gradual at the Masses of Christmas Day and historically on its octave, the Feast of the Circumcision. Two of the many settings of the text are famous as being among the earliest pieces of polyphony by known composers, Léonin and Pérotin of the Notre Dame school. Their music, known as organum, adds florid counterpoint to the Gregorian melody of the intonation and verse, portions normally sung by the cantors, the remainder of the chant being sung unchanged by the choir.

== Text ==
The text is derived from Psalm 98:2–4 and describes God's oversight of the Earth, an especially symbolic message given the musical unity that the composition came to represent.

== Latin ==
Vīdērunt omnēs fīnēs terræ
salūtāre Deī nostrī.
Jubilāte Deō, omnis terra.

Notum fēcit Dominus salūtāre suum;
ante conspectum gentium
revelāvit justitiam suam.

== English ==
All the ends of the earth have seen
the salvation of our God.
Rejoice in the Lord, all lands.

The Lord has made known his salvation;
in the sight of the nations
he has revealed his righteousness.

== Notre Dame school variations ==
=== Léonin ===
Léonin's two-part version of Viderunt Omnes was written about 1170 (the composer's dates are fl. 1150s — d. ? 1201). In his variation, the bottom voice sings the familiar chant as a drone while the top voice echoes in rich polyphony—a symbol of religious unity; a form of communal togetherness. As a theorist, Léonin developed complex sets of rhythmic modes and patterns that could only be written with a certain styling of ligatures. Due in large part to the development of mensural notation, his vision became common practice, allowing for discant and clausula.

=== Pérotin ===
Pérotin's four-part version of Viderunt, one of the few existing examples of organum quadruplum, may have been written for the Feast of the Circumcision in 1198. We know that at this time Eudes de Sully, Bishop of Paris, was promoting the use of polyphony.

The melismas in particular are especially diminuted, rendering the text virtually incomprehensible. While only solo sections are polyphonic, the organum remains clear when juxtaposed with the traditional, monophonic choir chant.

== Evolution with the motet ==
By the thirteenth century, syllabic introductions birthed the motet, placing an organum plainchant in the bottom voice and introducing new text in the upper registers of the vocal range. The texture, such as that of Adam de la Halle's 'De Ma Dame Vient', quotes the Latin 'Viderunt Omnes' while the upper voices sing a similar French passage. The divergent quality of two simultaneous texts adapts the pieces to a more elaborate syllabic setting. To accommodate the rhythmic freedom, Halle's use of mensural notation allowed the textural shapes to characterize the length of a pitch. The system allowed for shorter notes and stratified textures, allowing rapid movement of certain lines.

== Recordings ==
The original chant has been recorded for example by the monks of Santo Domingo de Silos (on the album Chant Noël: Chants For The Holiday Season).

There are a number of recordings of Perotin's setting. Several versions have been compared by Ivan Hewett, a music critic for the British newspaper The Telegraph. Hewett, who takes as his starting-point a 2005 recording by the vocal ensemble Tonus Peregrinus, does not discuss whether it is appropriate to use instruments in this music. However, a recording by the Deller Consort uses some instruments to accompany the singers. and there is an arrangement for string quartet by the Kronos Quartet (included on the album Early Music (Lachrymæ Antiquæ)).

== Sources and further reading ==
- Albright, Daniel (2004). Modernism and Music: An Anthology of Sources. University of Chicago Press. ISBN 0-226-01267-0.
- Bent, Ian D. (1980). "Pérotin". The New Grove Dictionary of Music and Musicians, 20 vols., ed. Stanley Sadie, 14:540–43. London, Macmillan Publishers Ltd. ISBN 1-56159-174-2
- Flotzinger, Rudolf (2000). Perotinus musicus: Wegbereiter abendländischen Komponierens. Mainz: Schott Musik International. ISBN 3-7957-0431-6.
- Gross, Guillaume (2001). "La repetitio dans les organa quadruples de Pérotin: Nature rhétorique de l'organisation du discours musical". Musurgia 8, no. 1 (Jeunes analystes, jeunes théoriciens): 7–29.
- Hoppin, Richard H. (1978). Medieval Music. New York: W. W. Norton & Co. ISBN 0-393-09090-6
- Jenny, Herbert J. (1942). "Perotin's "Viderunt omnes"". Bulletin of the American Musicological Society, no. 6 (August): 20–21.
- Page, Christopher. (1990) The Owl and the Nightingale: Musical Life and Ideas in France 1100–1300. University of California Press. ISBN 0-520-06944-7
