= Music history of France =

France has a rich music history that was already prominent in Europe as far back as the 10th century. French music originated as a unified style in medieval times, focusing around the Notre-Dame school of composers. This group developed the motet, a specific musical composition. Notable in the high Middle Ages were the troubadours and trouvères soon began touring France, composing and performing many original songs. The styles of ars nova and ars subtilior sprung up in the 14th century, both of which focused on secular songs. As Europe moved into the Renaissance age, the music of France evolved in sophistication. The popularity of French music in the rest of Europe declined slightly, yet the popular chanson and the old motet were further developed during this time. The epicenter of French music moved from Paris to Burgundy, as it followed the Burgundian School of composers. During the Baroque period, music was simplified and restricted due to Calvinist influence. The air de cour then became the primary style of French music, as it was secular and preferred by the royal court.

== Medieval music ==
Some of the earliest manuscripts with polyphony are organa from 10th century French cities like Chartres and Tours. The Saint Martial school is especially important, as are the 12th century Parisian composers at the Notre-Dame school from whence came the earliest motets. Secular music in medieval France was dominated by troubadours, jongleurs and trouvères, who were poets and musicians known for creating forms like the ballade (forme fixe) and lai. The most famous of the trouvère was Adam de la Halle.

=== Saint Martial school ===
The Saint Martial school, named after the Abbey of Saint Martial around which it was centered, was an important group in the development of early French music. The school created various forms of music based on poetry. These forms of music were often organa consisting of elaborate proses and tropes. Important composers from this school include Roger de Chabannes and his nephew and student Adémar de Chabannes. The manuscripts written by these two became very popular and included early uses of troper-prosers and sequentiaries. The duo also pioneered a new form of notation for their work that collected new forms of liturgical poetry. While polyphony was not invented at the Saint Martial school, the group developed it extensively and brought it into common use. All of these contributions made the Saint Martial school an important precursor to the later Notre-Dame school.

=== Notre-Dame school ===
The Notre-Dame school was a group of composers who used a style of polyphonic organum that flourished at Paris' Notre-Dame Cathedral between about 1170 to 1250. The only composers whose names have survived are Léonin and Pérotin. These two are believed to have written the Magnus Liber, a comprehensive book of organum.

==== Motet ====
The motet, a lyrical piece of music in several parts, evolved from the Notre-Dame school when upper-register voices were added to discant sections, usually strophic interludes, in a longer sequence of organum. Usually the discant representing a strophic sequence in Latin which was sung as a descant over a cantus firmus, which typically was a Gregorian chant fragment with different words from the descant. The motet took a definite rhythm from the words of the verse, and as such appeared as a brief rhythmic interlude in the middle of the longer, more chantlike organum.

=== Troubadours ===
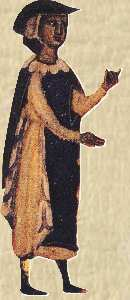
Bernard de Ventadour, a well-known troubador

In the 12th century, traveling noblemen and musicians called troubadours began traveling southern France. Inspired by the Code of Chivalry, troubadours composed and performed vernacular songs, in contrast to the older tradition dating back to the 10th century of goliards. The tradition seems to have originated in Aquitaine, and troubadours became most prominent in Europe in the late 11th and early 12th centuries. Provence was the region with the most troubadours, but the practice soon spread north and aristocrats like Adam de la Halle became the first trouvères. Contemporaneous with the troubadours, the trouvères, another itinerant class of musicians, used the langue d'oïl, while the troubadours used langue d'oc. This period ended abruptly with the Albigensian Crusade, which decimated southern France.

=== Ars nova and ars subtilior ===
Two of the major developments in music in the 14th century occurred in France. The first was ars nova, a new, predominantly secular style of music. It began with the publication of the Roman de Fauvel and culminated in the rondeaux, ballades, lais, virelais, motets, and single surviving mass of Guillaume de Machaut, who died in 1377. Philippe de Vitry, also a representative of ars nova, invented an improved system of musical notation and may have been the first composer of the isorhythmic motet.

The other important development was the extremely complex and sophisticated art of secular song which flourished in Avignon at the very end of the 14th century, ars subtilior. Ars subtilior immediately followed ars nova, and as the Latin definition suggests, this style was subtler than the earlier works. Ars subtilior was also even more complex, making it difficult to sing and most popular among music specialists.

== Renaissance music ==
The move of the center of musical activity from Paris to Burgundy defines the beginning of the musical Renaissance in France. The political instability under weak kings and continued dismemberment and acquisition of territory by the English during the Hundred Years' War all contributed to moving musicians east.

French musical domination of Europe ended during the Renaissance, and Flemish and Italian musicians became more important. Later French composers of the Renaissance include Antoine Brumel, Nicolas Gombert, Pierre de La Rue, Pierre de Manchicourt, Claude Goudimel, Pierre Certon, Jean Mouton, Claudin de Sermisy, Guillaume Bouzignac, Eustache du Caurroy and Clément Janequin. The French chanson became popular during this time, and was exported to Italy as the canzona.

=== Motet ===
The motet was known from the medieval era, but after about 1463, it evolved into an utterly distinct form. The cascading, passing chords created by the interplay between multiple voices and the absence of a strong or obvious beat are the features that distinguish the medieval vocal styles from those of the Renaissance. Instead, the Renaissance motet was a short polyphonic musical setting in imitative counterpoint, for chorus, of a religious text not specifically connected to the liturgy of a given day, and therefore suitable for use in any service. The cantus firmus was extended during the Renaissance period, making the motet suitable for use in a larger variety of services. The texts of antiphons were frequently used as motet texts. This is the sort of composition that is most familiarly called by the name of "motet," and the Renaissance period marked the flowering of the form.

=== Chanson ===
The chanson encompasses a wide array of forms and styles of secular song, through a period of almost three hundred years. The first important composer of chansons was Guillaume de Machaut, with later figures in the genre including Johannes Ockeghem and Josquin des Prez. Guillaume Dufay and Gilles Binchois wrote so-called Burgundian chansons, which were somewhat simpler in style, while Claudin de Sermisy and Clément Janequin were composers of so-called Parisian chansons which abandoned the formes fixes (as Josquin had also done) and were in a simpler, more homophonic style (many of these Parisian works were published by Pierre Attaingnant). Later composers, such as Orlando de Lassus, were influenced by the Italian madrigal.

=== Burgundian School ===
Composers who worked at the courts of the Dukes of Burgundy are known collectively as the Burgundian School; some of the principal names associated with this school are Guillaume Dufay, Gilles Binchois, Hayne van Ghizeghem and Antoine Busnois. They wrote vernacular secular music in a clear, simple, melodic style, principally rondeaux, but also Latin sacred music, such as motets and cantus firmus masses.

== Baroque music ==
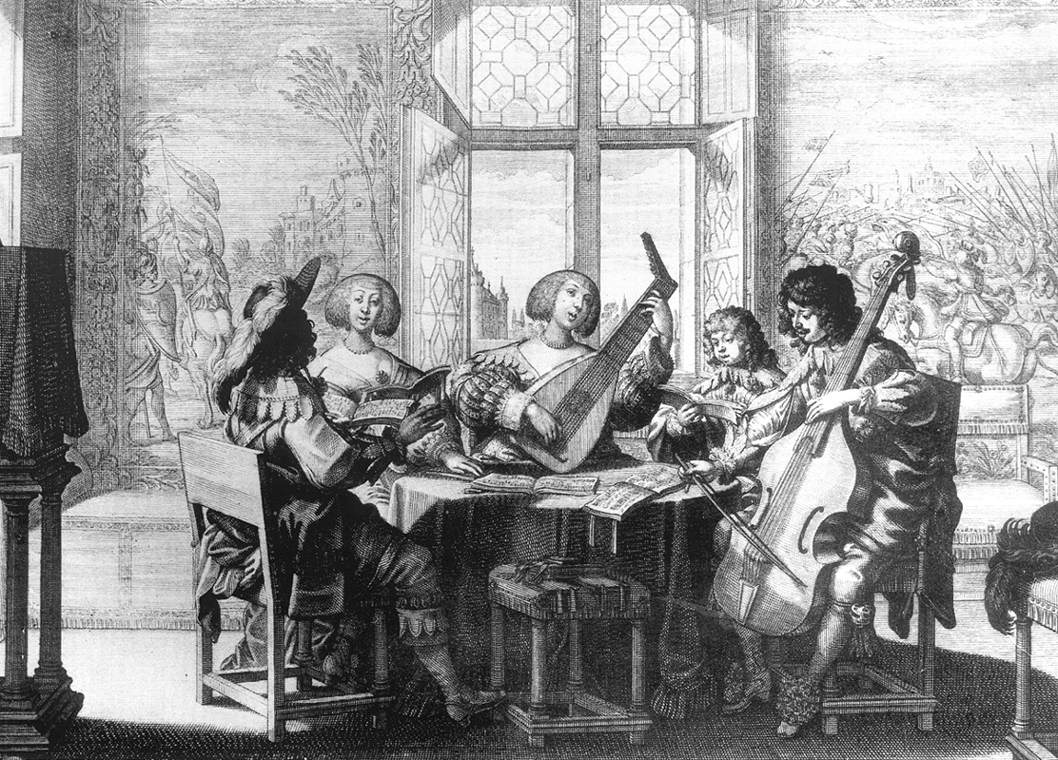
"Les Cinq Sens: L'Ouïe", an etching by Abraham Bosse, c. 1638

With the arrival of Calvinism, music was relatively simple, at least in the parts of France subject to Calvinist influence. In strictly Calvinist areas, the only musical expression allowed was singing of French translations of the Psalms, for instance those written by Goudimel (who was killed in the St. Bartholomew's Day Massacre in 1572). Starting with the 17th century, Italian and German opera was the most influential form of music, though French opera composers like Balthasar de Beaujoyeaux, Marc-Antoine Charpentier, Henri Desmarest, Marin Marais, Jean Philippe Rameau and Jean Baptiste Lully made a distinctive national style characterized by dance rhythms, spoken dialogue and a lack of Italian recitative arias.

The Baroque period saw a flourishing of harpsichord music. Influential composers included Jacques Champion de Chambonnières, Louis Couperin, Élisabeth Jacquet de La Guerre, François Couperin. Jean Philippe Rameau, a prominent opera composer, wrote an influential treatise on musical theory, especially in the subject of harmony; he also introduced the clarinet into his orchestras.

The Baroque period saw also a flourishing of "Grand Motet and Petit Motet" music. Influential composers included, Henri Dumont, Jean Gilles, Marc-Antoine Charpentier, Henri Desmarest, Michel Richard Delalande, André Campra, and Jean-Joseph de Mondonville.

=== Air de cour ===
In the late Renaissance and early Baroque period, approximately from 1570 to 1650 and peaking from 1610 and 1635, a type of popular secular vocal music called air de cour spread throughout France. Though airs de cour originally used only one voice with lute accompaniment, they grew to incorporate four to five voices by the end of the 16th century. Halfway through the 17th century, they switched back again to a single voice.

== See also ==
- French classical music
