= Copula (music) =

With regard to early polyphony the term copula has a variety of meanings. At its most basic level, it can be thought of as the linking of notes together to form a melody. "A copula is a rapid, connected discant..." However, it is often considered to be a particular type of polyphonic texture similar to organum, but with modal rhythm. The music theorist Johannes de Garlandia favoured this description of copula. The term refers to music where the lower voice sings long, sustained notes (the chant or tenor) while the higher voices sing faster-moving harmony lines. This style is typical of what is referred to as Notre Dame Polyphony; examples of which can be found in the Magnus Liber Organi. Copula might have implied a strophic construction with much repetition in the various parts, which was characteristic of much of the music written in this idiom. The upper part consists of "antecedent-consequent" phrases, themselves featuring much melodic repetition. The rhythm is notated in copula, unlike in organum. It is, in essence, the "coming together" of these two (or more) parts at the cadence that led to the term copula being used, from the Latin meaning "that binds."

Franco of Cologne, a music theorist, considered copula to be one of the three categories of discantus - copula itself being the type that was "continuous." He further describes it as a fast, cadential passage that is similar to either the 2nd or 6th rhythmic mode, although it differs in tempo and notation.

== See also ==
- Ligature
- Medieval music
