= Pérotin =

12th-century French composer

- Other names: Perotinus, Perrotinus, Perotinus Magnus, Magister Perotinus
- Occupation: Composer
- Years active: fl. c. 1200
- Known for: Polyphony
- Notable work: Viderunt omnes, Sederunt principes, Alleluia Nativitas

Pérotin (Note: Pérotin's name is recorded in many variants, including Perrotinus, Perotinus Magnus, Magister Perotinus, and Perotinus.) (fl. c. 1200) was a composer associated with the Notre Dame school of polyphony in Paris and the broader ars antiqua musical style of high medieval music. He is credited with developing the polyphonic practices of his predecessor Léonin, with the introduction of three and four-part harmonies.

Other than a brief mention by music theorist Johannes de Garlandia in his De Mensurabili Musica, virtually all information on Pérotin's life comes from Anonymous IV, a pseudonymous English student who probably studied in Paris. Anonymous IV names seven titles from a Magnus Liber—including Viderunt omnes, Sederunt principes and Alleluia Nativitas—that have been identified with surviving works and gives him the title Magister Perotinus (Pérotinus the Master), meaning he was licensed to teach. It is assumed that Perotinus was French and named Pérotin, a diminutive of Peter, but attempts to match him with persons in contemporary documents remain speculative.

== Identity and career ==
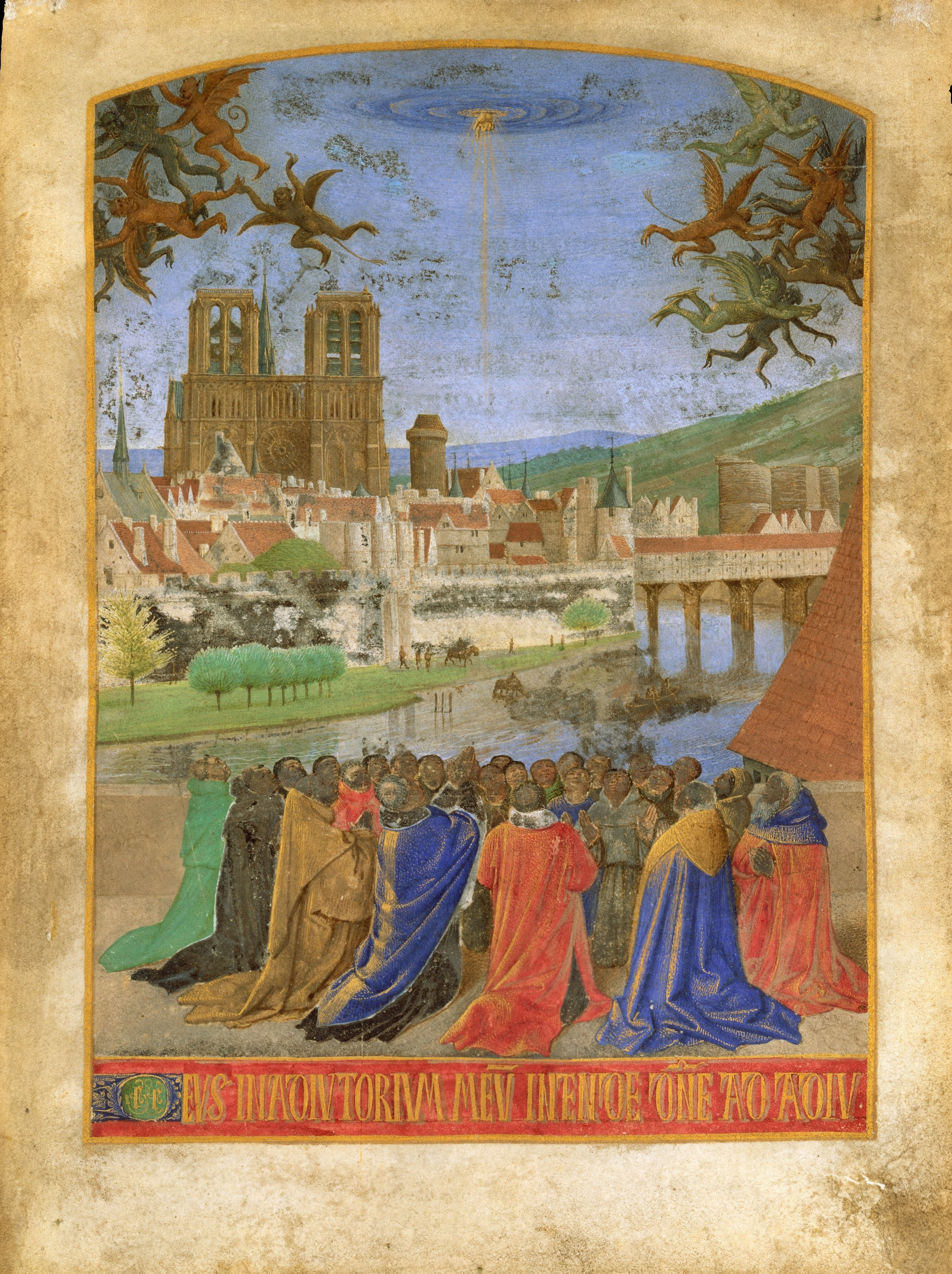
Notre-Dame and the rest of Paris in the background of a c. 1452–1460 illuminated manuscript by Jean Fouquet

Pérotin, about whom little is known, most likely lived around the end of the 12th and beginning of the 13th century and is presumed to have been French. The closest thing to a contemporary account of his life comes from two much later reporters: a brief mention attributed to the music theorist Johannes de Garlandia (Note: Sed proprietas praedieta vix tenetur in aliquibus, quod patet in quadruplieibus magistri Perrotini per totum in principio magni voluminis, quae quadrupla optima reperiuntur et proportionata et in eolore eonservata, ut manifeste ibidem patet Johannes de Garland was long thought to be the author, but is more likely to have been the editor of an existing manuscript) (fl. c. 1270–1320) in his De Mensurabili Musica, and four mentions in the works of a late 13c English student known as Anonymous IV. At one stage Anonymous IV was thought to be a pupil of Johannes de Garlandia, but this is unlikely, and the name is a misnomer, derived from the title of notes by Charles-Edmond-Henri de Coussemaker, Anonymus IV. These were probably notes taken by the student in a lecture. including this paragraph:

These rules were used in many older books; this was so during and after the time of Perotinus the Great. Nevertheless, they did not know how to distinguish these notes from those which will be presented shortly. This was so even since the time of Leo, because two ligated notes were put for the durational value of a brevis longa, and in a similar manner, three ligated notes were quite often used for a longa brevis, longa. People say Maître Leonin was the best composer of Organum (optimus organista), he composed the Great Organum Book for the gradual and antiphonary in order to prolong the divine service. This book remained in use until the time of the great Perotin who abridged it and composed clausules and sections that were many in number and better because he was the best composer of descant (optimus discantor). This Magister Perotinus made the best quadrupla, such as Viderunt and Sederunt, with an abundance of striking musical embellishments [colores armonicae artis]; likewise, the noblest tripla, such as Alleluia, Posui adiutorium and [Alleluia], Nativitas etc. He also made three-voice conductus, such as Salvatoris hodie, and two-voice conductus, such as Dum sigillum summi Patris, and also, among many others, monophonic conductus, such as Beata viscera etc. The book, that is, the books of Magister Perotinus, were in use in the choir of the Paris cathedral of the Blessed Virgin up to the time of Magister Robertus de Sabilone, (Note: Robertus de Sabilone fl. 1250) and from his time up to the present day. (Note: Et nota, quod magister Leoninus, secundum quod dicebatur, fuit optimus organista, qui fecit magnum librumorgani de gradali et antifonario pro servitio divino multiplicando. Et fuit in usu usque ad tempus Perotini Magni, qui abbreviavit eundem et fecit clausulas sive puncta plurima meliora, quoniam optimus discantor erat, et melior quam Leoninus erat. Sed hoc non [est] dicendum de subtilitate organi etc. Ipse vero magister Perotinus fecit quadrupla optima sicut Viderunt, Sederunt cum habundantia colorum armonicae artis (...) similiter est tripla plurima nobilissima sicut Alleluia Posui adiutorium Nativitas.)

There have been many speculative attempts to identify Pérotin with members of the Notre Dame administration, (Note: For instance, the elaborate reconstruction of his career by Craig Wright.) but these have not generally been accepted. Of the several people with that name (Petrus) that have been suggested, the commonest are Petrus Cantor (died 1197), who was a theologian, and another Petrus who was Succentor at Notre Dame ca. 1207–1238. Of these two, Petrus Succentor has been suggested as more probable, in part on chronological grounds, and partly because of the succentor's role in overseeing the celebration of the liturgy in the cathedral (whose choir was dedicated 1182), but this is purely speculative, resting on an assumption that the composer held some important rank in the cathedral hierarchy.

Pérotin is considered to be the most important member of the Notre Dame school of polyphony, a group of composers working at or near the cathedral in Paris from about 1160 to 1250, creators of the ars antiqua style. The dates of Pérotin's life and works have long been a subject of debate, but are generally thought to be from about 1155/60 (or earlier) to around 1200/05 (or later), based on the evolution of French choral writing during this time (see Works), in particular, his apparent absence from the flowering of the French motet that occurred after 1210.

Pérotin was one of very few composers of his day whose name has been preserved, and can be reliably attached to individual compositions, most of which have been transcribed. Anonymous IV called him Magister Perotinus (Pérotinus the Master). The title, employed also by Johannes de Garlandia, means that Perotinus, like Léonin, earned the degree magister artium, almost certainly in Paris, and that he was licensed to teach. However, only Anonymous IV employed the epithet Perotinus Magnus (Perotinus the Great). The name Perotinus, the Latin diminutive of Petrus, is assumed to be derived from the French name Pérotin, diminutive of Pierre. However "Petrus" was one of the most common names in the Île-de-France during the High Middle Ages, making further identification difficult. The diminutive was presumably a mark of respect bestowed by his colleagues. The title Magnus was a mark of the esteem in which he was held, even long after his death.

== Historical context ==
=== Notre Dame School ===
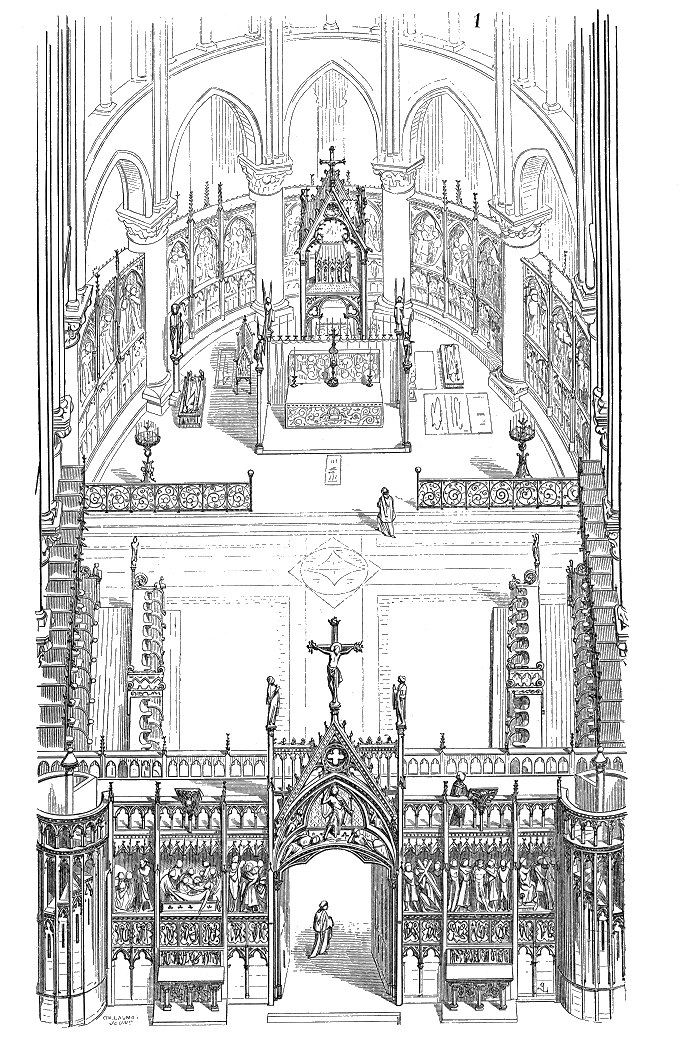
Eugène Viollet-le-Duc's reconstruction of the medieval choir of Notre Dame de Paris (1856) (Note: The illustration from Dictionnaire raisonné de l’architecture française du XIe au XVIe siècle is based on written descriptions from 1532 and 1612.)

The reign of Louis VII (1137–1180) witnessed a period of cultural innovation, in which appeared the Notre Dame school of musical composition, and the contributions of Léonin, who prepared two-part choral settings (organa) for all the major liturgical festivals. This period in musical history has been described as a paradigm shift of lasting consequence in musical notation and rhythmic composition, with the development of the organum, clausula, conductus and motet. The innovative nature of the Notre Dame style stands in contrast to its predecessor, that of the Abbey of St Martial, Limoges, replacing the monophonic Gregorian chant with polyphony (more than one voice singing at a time). This was the beginning of polyphonic European church music. Organum at its roots involves simple doubling (organum duplum or organum purum) of a chant at intervals of a fourth or fifth, above or below. This school also marked a transition from music that was essentially performance to a less ephemeral entity that was committed to parchment, preserved and transmitted to history. It is also the beginning of the idea of composers and compositions, the introduction of more than two voices and the treatment of vernacular texts. For the first time, rhythm became as important as pitch, to the extent that the music of this era came to be known as musica mensurabilis (music that can be measured). These developments and the notation that evolved laid the foundations of musical practice for centuries. The surviving manuscripts from the thirteenth century together with the contemporaneous treatises on musical theory constitute the musical era of ars antiqua. The Notre Dame repertory spread throughout Europe. In Paris polyphony was being performed in the late 1190s but later sources imply that some of the compositions date back as far as the 1160s. Although often linked to the construction of the cathedral itself, construction commenced in 1163 and the altar consecrated in 1182. However, there was evidence of musical creativity there from the early twelfth century.

Léonin's work was distinguished by two distinctive organum styles, purum and discantus. This early polyphonic organa was still firmly based on Gregorian chant, to which a second voice was added. The chant was called the tenor (cantus firmus or vox principalis), which literally "holds" (Latin: tenere) the melody. The tenor is based on an existing plainsong melody from the liturgical repertoire (such as the Alleluia, Verse or Gradual, from the Mass, or a Responsory or Benedicamus from the Office). This quotation of plainchant melody is a defining characteristic of thirteenth century musical genres. In organum purum the tenor part was drawn out into long pedal points, while the upper part or duplum contrasted with it in a much freer rhythm, consisting of melisms (melismatic or several notes per syllable, compared to syllabic, a single note per syllable). In the second, discantus, style, the tenor was allowed to be melismatic, and the notes were quicker and more regular with the upper part becoming equally rhythmic. These more rhythmic sections were known as clausulae (puncta). Another innovation was the standardization of note forms, and Léonin's new square notes were quickly adopted. Although he developed the discantus style, Léonin's strength was as a writer of organum purum. The singing of organa fell into disuse by the mid thirteenth century. Associated with the Notre Dame school, was Johannes de Garlandia, whose De mensurabili provided a theoretical basis, for Notre Dame polyphony is essentially musica mensurabilis, music that is measured in time. In his treatise, he defines three forms of polyphony, organum in speciali, copula, and discant, which are defined by the relationship of the voices to each other and by the rhythmic flow of each voice.

=== Magnus liber organi ===
Léonin compiled his compositions into a book, the Magnus liber organi (Great Organum Book), around 1160. Pérotin's works are preserved in this compilation of early polyphonic church music, which was in the collection of the cathedral of Notre Dame in Paris. (Note: Three different versions of the Magnus liber exist, and also some additional fragments) The Magnus liber also contains the work of his successors. In addition to two-part organa, this book contains three- and four-part compositions in four distinct forms: organa, clausulae, conducti and motets, and three distinct styles. In the organum style the upper voices are highly mobile over a tenor voice moving in long unmeasured notes. The discant style has the tenor moving in measured notes, but still more slowly than the upper voices. The third style has all voices moving note on note, and is largely limited to conductus. The surviving sources all commence with a four-voice organal setting of the Christmas Gradual, Viderunt omnes fines terrae (lit. 'All the ends of the earth have seen'), believed to be Pérotin's, as most likely did the original Liber. However, the manuscripts and fragments that survive (Note: One of the earliest, ca. 1227 being the Beauvais manuscript) date well into the thirteenth century, meaning that they are preserved in a form notated by musicians working several generations following Léonin and Pérotin. This collection of music constitutes the earliest known record of polyphony to have the stability and circulation achieved earlier by monophonic Gregorian chant.

== Music ==
=== Forms and style ===
Alleluia nativitas
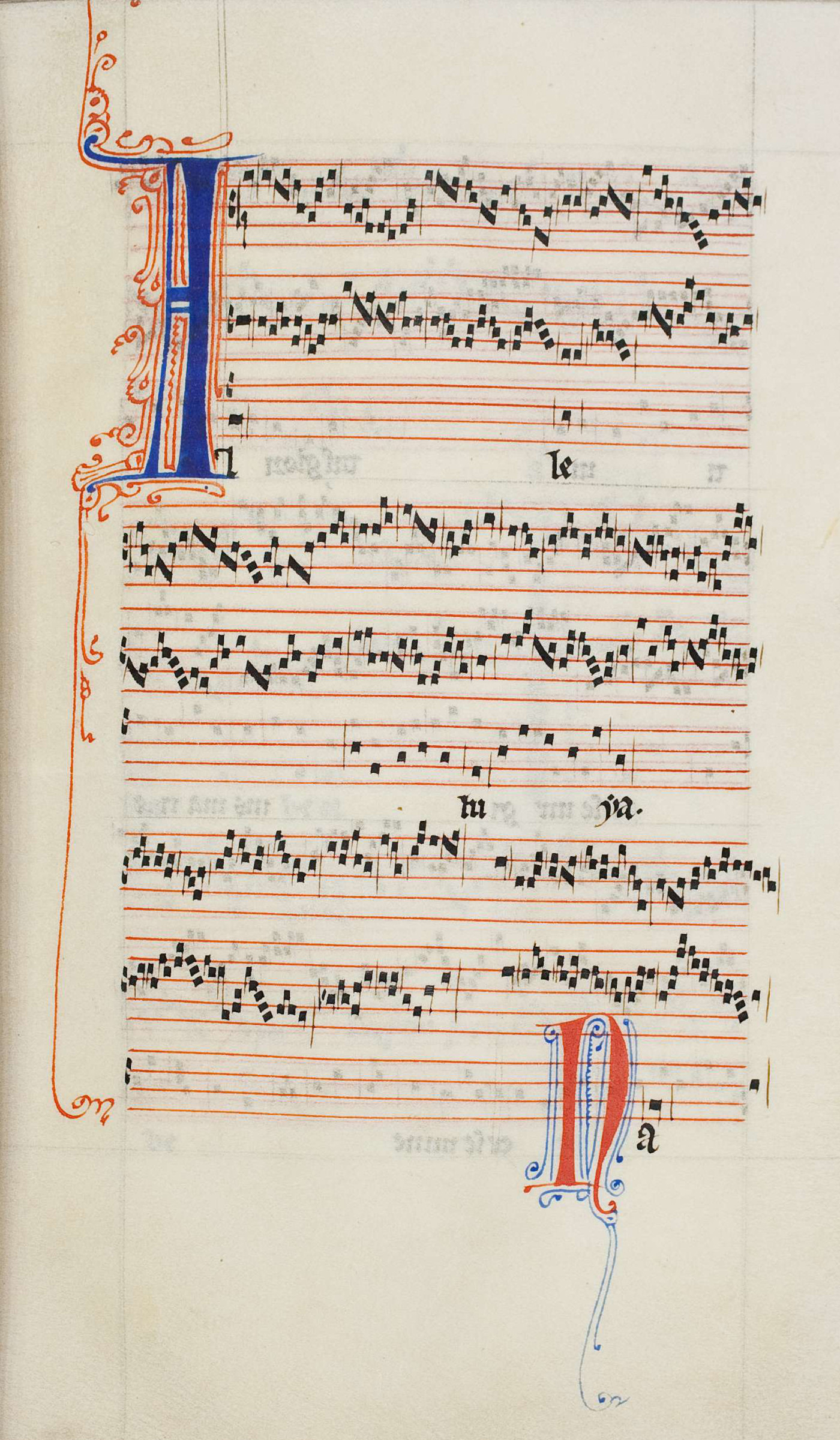

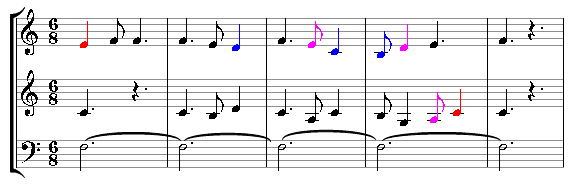
Modern transcription of passage showing use of fourths (blue:unison, red:third, black:fourth, magenta:fifth)

Louis VII was succeeded by his son Philip II in 1179 and his reign was marked by integration and revision of the cultural shifts that had transpired under his father. It was during this time that the compositions of Pérotin first appeared, and a shift towards a more predominant discantus style. Pérotin is best known for his composition of both liturgical organa and non-liturgical conducti in which the voices move note on note. He pioneered the styles of organum triplum and organum quadruplum (three and four-part polyphony) and his Viderunt omnes and Sederunt principes et adversum me loquebantur (lit. 'Princes sat and plotted against me') Graduals for Christmas (Note: At Notre Dame Viderunt was sung at the new feast of the Circumcision on 1 January) and the feast of Saint Stephen's Day (26 December) respectively are among only a few organa quadrupla known, early polyphony having been restricted to two-part compositions. With the addition of further parts, the compositions became known as motets, the most important form of polyphony of the period. Pérotin's two Graduals for the Christmas season represent the highest point of his style, with a large scale tonal design in which the massive pedal points sustain the swings between consecutive harmonies, and an intricate interplay among the three upper voices. Pérotin also furthered the development of musical notation, moving it further from improvisation. Despite this, we know nothing of how these works came about.

In addition to his own compositions, as noted by Anonymous IV, Pérotin set about revising the Magnus liber organi. Léonin's added duplum required skill, and had to be sung fast with up to 40 notes to one of the underlying chant, as a result of which the actual text progressed very slowly. Pérotin shortened these passages, while adding further voice parts to enrich the harmony. The degree to which he did this has been debated due to the phrase abbreviavit eundem by Anonymous IV. Usually translated as abbreviate, it has been surmised that he shortened the Magnus liber by replacing organum purum with discant clausulae or simply replacing existing clausulae with shorter ones. Some 154 clausulae have been attributed to Pérotin but many other clausulae are elaborate compositions that would actually expand the compositions in the Liber, and these stylistically resemble his known works which are on a much grander scale than those of his predecessor, and hence do not represent "abbreviation". An alternative rendering of abbreviavit is to write down, suggesting that he actually prepared a new edition using his better developed system of rhythmic notation, including mensural notation, as mentioned by Anonymous IV.

Two styles emerged from the organum duplum, the "florid" and "discant" (discantus). The former was more typical of Léonin, the latter of Pérotin, though this indirect attribution has been challenged. Anonymous IV described Léonin as optimus organista (the best composer of organa) but Pérotin, who revised the former's Magnus liber organi (Great Organum Book), as optimus discantor referring to his discant composition. In the original discant organum duplum, the second voice follows the cantus firmus, note on note but at an interval, usually a fourth above. By contrast, in the florid organum, the upper or vox organalis voice wove shorter notes around the longer notes of the lower tenor chant.

=== Compositions ===
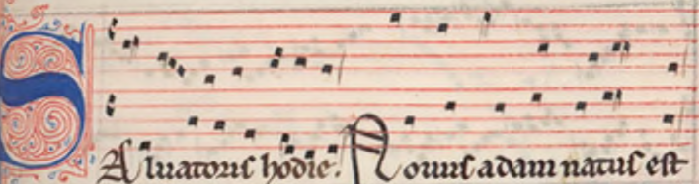
Square notes in Pérotin's Salvatoris hodie

Anonymous IV mentions a number of compositions which he attributes to Pérotin, including the four-voice Viderunt omnes and Sederunt principes, and the three-voice Alleluia "Posui adiutorium" and Alleluia "Nativitas". Johannes de Garlandia states that the Magnus Liber commences with Perotin's four-part organa, and makes specific reference to the notation in the three-part Alleluya, Posui adiutorium. (Note: Alia regula de eodem. Sed non probatur per istam artem, sed bene probatur per exemplum, quod invenitur in Alleluja Posui adjutorium, in triplo scilicet quatuor cum proprietate et perfectione et tres et tres et tres cum proprietate etc., ut sumitur in hoc exemplo) Other works are attributed to him by later scholars, such as Heinrich Husmann, on stylistic grounds, all in the organum style, as well as the two-voice Dum sigillum summi Patris and the monophonic Beata viscera (lit. 'O blessed womb') (Note: Asensio 1997 maintains that the Beata was attributed to Pérotin by Anonymous IV) in the conductus style. (The conductus sets a rhymed Latin poem called a sequence to a repeated melody, much like a contemporary hymn.) By tradition, the four-part pieces of the Notre Dame school have been attributed to Pérotin, leaving the two-part pieces to Léonin. The former include the three-part conductus Salvator hodie. The latter is placed in the Mass for the Circumcision in a 13th-century French manuscript. Of these, the best known works are his Viderunt omnes and Sederunt principes. These have been described as representing the peak of musical development of the time.

Most of Pérotin's works are in polyphonic form of discant, including the quadrupla and tripla. Here the upper voices move in discant, as rhythmic counterpoint above the sustained tenor notes. This is consistent with Anonymous IV's description of him as optimus discantor. However, like Léonin, he is likely to have composed in every musical genre and style known to Notre Dame polyphony. Pérotin's dates of activity have been approximated from some late 12th century edicts (Statuta et donationes piae) of the Bishop of Paris, Odo (Eudes de Sully) (1196–1208), in 1198 and 1199. Rebuked by Peter of Capua, the papal legate of the time, the bishop sought to reform the rituals around the Christmas season, forbidding the boistrous costumed performances that existed at the time, in particular, the Feast of Fools. His preference was for elaborate music in its stead, calling for performance in organa triplo vel quadruplo for the Responsory and Benedicamus and other settings. (Note: Matutini ab episcopo, vel decano, vel capellano incipiantur ordine debito consummandi, hoc adjecto quod tertium et sextum responsorium in organo (vel in triplo, vel in quadruplo) cantabuntur Matins by the bishop or dean or chaplain shall be conducted in the proper order so that the 3rd and 6th responsories be sung with organum (either in triple, or in quadruple (for an English translation of the 11998 edict, see Wright (1989, p. 239))) The bishop's edicts are quite specific, and suggest that Pérotin's organum quadruplum Viderunt omnes was written for Christmas 1198, and his other organum quadruplum Sederunt Principes was composed for Saint Stephen's Day 1199, for the dedication of a new wing of the Notre Dame Cathedral. (Note: The bishop's letters attest to the development of organum duplum at Notre-Dame from the 1160s and its subsequent integration into all the great feasts of the liturgical calendar, not only in the responsorial chants of the Mass proper but also the Benedicamus Domino of vespers) If written after this, they could not have been written till late 1200 or 1201, since for most of 1200 France lay under an interdict of Pope Innocent III which suppressed the celebration of church services. Hans Tischler dates the revision of the Magnus Liber to around 1180/90. Between the accounts of Anonymous IV, the episcopal edicts and the arrangements in the Magnus liber, the key compositions appear to be corroborated and assigned to this period.

Pérotin composed music to at least five of the poems of the Chancellor of the cathedral, Philippe le Chancelier (Philip the Chancellor). Philip, also a canon there, held that title at the cathedral from 1218 till his death in 1236, suggesting a possible later date for Pérotin's setting of the former's Beata viscera (ca. 1220), or at least a terminus ante quem. Others believe this poem was written much earlier, and hence place Pérotin's death as no later than 1205, the bishop's edicts implying that Pérotin's work was well before this. (Note: It cannot be ascertained with certainty that Pérotin's works were not written before the episcopal edict.) Philip appears to have written a number of poems with the intention of them being set to music by Pérotin, (Note: set as clausulae) and with him is given credit for the development of the motet.

== Works ==
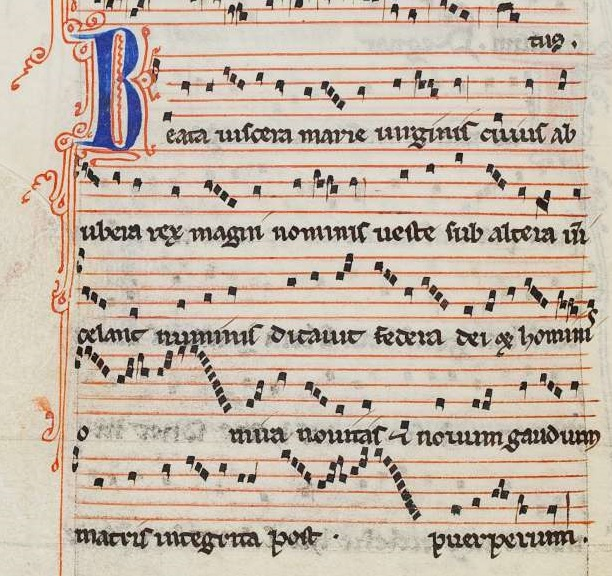
Pérotin's monophonic Beata viscera from Wolfenbüttel 1099 (W2) MS

Anonymous IV identified seven works, that he presumably considered worthy of singling out, and these represent the only direct attribution. Subsequent authors have attributed works on stylistic and chronological grounds. These include Friedrich Ludwig (1910), Heinrich Husmann (1940), Hans Tischler (1950) and Ethel Thurston (1970). Husmann added an additional nine three-part organa, and five clausula to which Ludwig added numerous other clausula. Other authors have attributed all the three-part organa in the Magnus Liber to Pérotin, which is unlikely. Nevertheless, two of the only three known four-part organa can be attributed to him.

Key: Anonymous IV (A), Johannes de Garlandia (G), Tischler (Ti), Thurston (Th), Husmann (H). Numbers refer to folios in the F manuscript of the Magnus liber.

- Four-part organa
  - Viderunt omnes, continued with organal motet Homo cum mandato (A)(Ti)(Th)(H) F1
  - Sederunt principes, with organal motet De Stephani roseo (A)(Ti)(Th)(H)
  - Sederunt principes, continued with organal motet Adesse festina (A)(Th)(H)
- Three-part organa
  - Alleluia nativitas (A)(Ti)(Th)(H) F31
  - Alleluia, Posui adiutorium (A)(G)(Ti)(H) F36
  - Alleluia, Dies sanctificatus (Ti)
  - Alleluia, Pascha nostrum (Ti)(H)
  - Alleluia, Dilexit Andream (H)
  - Stirps Yesse (Ti)
  - Virgo (Ti)(H)
  - Sancte Germane(H)
  - Terribilis(H)
  - Exiit sermo (H)
- Conductus
  - French conductus motet Se i'ai ame: Ex semine (Th)
  - 3 part Conductus Salvatoris hodie (A)(Ti)(Th)(H) F307
  - 2 part Conductus Dum sigillum summi patris (A)(Ti)(Th)(H) F344
  - 1 part Conductus Beata viscera Marie virginis (A)(Ti)(Th)(H)
  - 5 Benedicamus Domino (Ti) (3 (H))
- 3 part clausulas
  - In odorem (H)
  - Et illuminare (H)
  - Et gaudebit (H)
  - Et exaltavi (H)
- 2 part clausulas (numerous (H))
  - Doubtful
- 4 part Clausula Mors (H)

== Influence ==
Pérotin has been described as the first modern composer in the Western tradition, radically transforming the work of his predecessors from a largely improvisatory technique to a distinct musical architecture. Pérotin's music has influenced modern minimalist composers such as Steve Reich, particularly in Reich's work Proverb.

== Recordings ==
for discography, see McComb (2019)

- Chanticleer (1991). Psallite! A Renaissance Christmas (CD) (in Latin).
  - Perotin (1991). Benedicamus Domino. (audio and visual)
- Gothic Revolution – Sacred Music The Sixteen, Harry Christophers, Simon Russell Beale CORO DVD
- Messe de la Nativité de la Vierge. Ensemble Organum, Marcel Pérès. Harmonia Mundi 901538 (1995).
- Perotin. The Hilliard Ensemble, CD ECM New Series, 837–751–2
- Sacred Music From Notre-Dame Cathedral, Tonus Peregrinus; Antony Pitts, CD NAXOS 8.557340 (2005)
