= Clausula (music) =

Medieval compositional technique

The clausula (Latin for "little close” or “little conclusion"; plural clausulae) was a newly composed section of discant ("note against note") inserted into a pre-existing setting of organum. Clausulae flourished in the late twelfth and thirteenth centuries and were associated with the Notre Dame school. The origin of the clausula has long been subject of scholarly debate, as the relationship between clausulae and motets is very complicated. Clausulae eventually became used as substitutes for passages of original plainchant. They occur as melismatic figures based on a single word or syllable within an organum.

== Origins ==
Clausulae emerged from the compositional practices of the Notre Dame school in Paris c. 1160–1250 (during the stylistic period known as ars antiqua). The composers Léonin and Pérotin in particular contributed heavily in composing clausulae. Rather than write entirely new music, the preference was to take existing music, that is, plainchant melodies, and develop or improve upon them. According to an English author known as Anonymous IV (c. 1280), "Pérotin was better at making clausulae than Léonin had been in that Pérotin was better at making better discant style of clausulae." The appearance of clausulae provided the first rhythmic system. (It is hard to find rhythmic notation in the earliest motets because of the lack of the use of clear rhythmic notation in the manuscripts.) Pérotin's clausulae make use of the rhythmic modes, whose strict metrical feet necessitated that voices change notes together (discantus). This was in contrast to the earlier practice of one voice moving in a free rhythm above a "tenor" voice (Latin tenere: "to hold") sustaining the long notes of a cantus firmus. The tenor line was often repeated to allow for expansion of the clausula; this was the origin of the technique known as isorhythm.

The scholarly debate over the origin of the clausula continues. In particular, rather than seeing clausula as a genre, the part composed in the style of discantus with a definite final cadence was called clausula. Thus, there are more studies that relate specifically to the motet, rather than studies of the origin of the clausula. One scholar writes that "the motet arose through the addition of Latin texts to the melismatic upper voices of the two-voice clausulae and was thereby able to explain for the first time the previously baffling and unprecedented verse structures of many motet texts." Others claim that by the removal of the text of a motet in its original composition, it was changed into a clausula. As the relationship between clausulae and motets is very complicated, there are conflicting conclusions on whether the clausula or the motet came first. Instead, the relationship between the two is complexly intertwined and closely influenced by each other.

== Function and development ==
Clausulae enriched pre-existing settings of organum. Hundreds of clausulae in two, three and four parts were incorporated into the Magnus Liber Organi of Léonin and Pérotin. Others were arranged in liturgical order within manuscripts so that they could be easily introduced into a particular organum setting or piece of plainchant. As they were notated separately, it was possible for them to be expanded and developed further, and they eventually became standalone pieces which could be sung at certain points in the liturgy. At that time, there were some clausulae that people liked or were particularly popular, for example, those composed on the tenor REGNAT from the verse of the Ascension Alleluia Hodie Maria virgo in the early thirteenth-century. Over time, the appearance and use of clausulae changed little by little, but the images of clausulae found in different times and regions still had similar characters. Some clausulae matched the melodic lines from the French motet without text. This is an important clue to the eventual transformation of clausulae into the form of motet. The composition of clausulae died out in the mid-13th century as they were replaced by motets as the main platform for the development of new compositional techniques. Norman Smith claimed that the music of pre-existing clausulae in three early thirteenth-century Latin motets in the Florence Manuscript resemble each other so much that it's hard to find differences in rhythms between the motet and the clausula, which clearly exists. However the difference reflects the artistic changes that occurred in the process of texting clausulae. Obviously, possibilities and usefulness of clausula played a pivotal role in the creation of an important musical genre called the motet.
