= Benedicamus Domino =

Closing salutation in Christian Mass

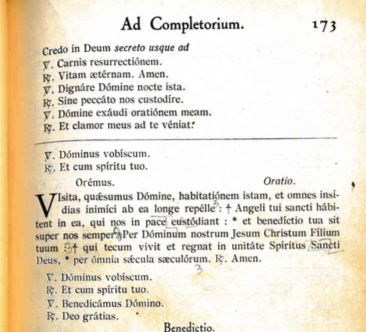
Benedicamus Domino after completorium in the Antiphonale Monasticum

Benedicamus Domino (Latin for 'Let us bless the Lord') is a closing salutation that was formerly used in the Latin Mass instead of the Ite, missa est in Masses which lack the Gloria (i.e., Masses of the season during Advent, Septuagesima, Lent, and Passiontide; ferial Masses per annum at which the Mass of the preceding Sunday was repeated, except in Eastertide; most votive Masses). The response, said afterwards, is Deo gratias ('Thanks be to God'). It is also sung as a versicle at the end of all Offices. The Benedicamus Domino continues to be used in the Mass of the Lutheran churches and in the Divine Office.

== History and liturgical use ==
Apparently the chant was unknown in Rome before about AD 1000, and may have originated in the Gallican liturgy. In modern chantbooks, the music given for the chant is exactly the same as for the Ite missa est, but it is not known how much that was true in the medieval period as well.

The text was frequently troped, especially by adding text between the two words, or using the melody as the cantus firmus for an organum. The use of this chant as a tenor was common in the St. Martial and Notre Dame schools of polyphony, including a dozen settings in the Magnus Liber Organi.

During the liturgical reforms of Pope Pius XII (1939–1958) and Pope John XXIII (1958–1963) the use of the Benedicamus Domino was much restricted. By 1963, it was only recited or chanted when an exposition immediately follows the Mass (Eucharisticum Mysterium, 120). It is rarely heard in Anglo-Saxon countries, processions being rarities there. It is still however, used in the Divine Office.

The Lutheran churches continue to use it in the Divine Office and at the end of the Mass (Divine Service).
