= Magnus Liber =

13th century collection of music

Magnus Liber Organi
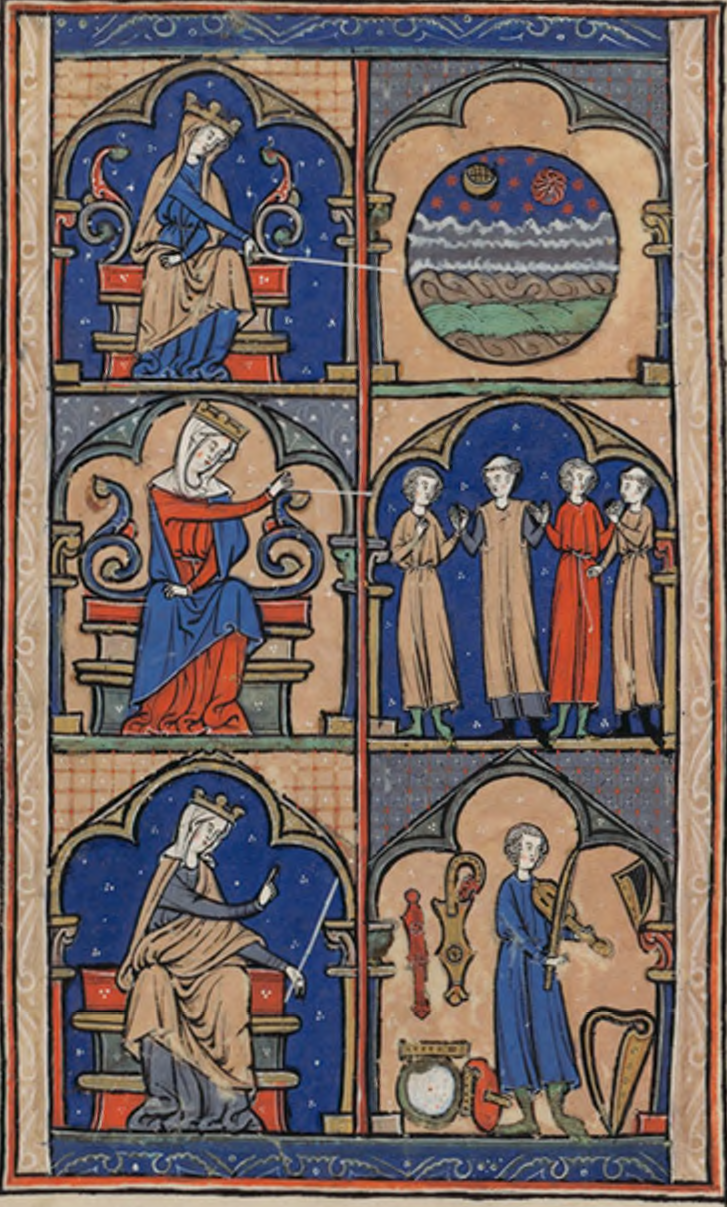
- MS F
- Author: Anonymous
- Language: Latin
- Subject: Musical score
- Published: 13th century
- Publication place: France
- Website: digitalcommons.cedarville.edu/sing_polyphony/2

The Magnus Liber or Magnus liber organi (English translation: Great Book of Organum), written in Latin, is a repertory of medieval music known as organum. This collection of organum survives today in three major manuscripts. This repertoire was in use by the Notre-Dame school composers working in Paris around the end of the twelfth and beginning of the thirteenth centuries, though it is well agreed upon by scholars that Leonin contributed a bulk of the organum in the repertoire. This large body of repertoire is known from references to a "magnum volumen" by Johannes de Garlandia and to a "Magnus liber organi de graduali et antiphonario pro servitio divino" by the English music theorist known as Anonymous IV. Today it is known only from later manuscripts containing compositions named in Anonymous IV's description. The Magnus Liber is regarded as one of the earliest collections of polyphony.

== Surviving Manuscripts ==
The Magnus Liber organi most likely to have originated in Paris and is known today from only a few surviving manuscripts and fragments, and there are records of at least seventeen lost versions. Today its contents can be inferred from the three surviving major manuscripts:

- Florence Manuscript [F] (I-Fl Pluteo 29.1, Biblioteca Medicea-Laurenziana, Florence ) 1,023 compositions | 1250 A.D.
- Wolfenbüttel 677 [W1] (Wolfenbüttel Cod. Guelf. 628 Helmst.) Saint Andrews, Scotland | 1250 A.D.
- Wolfenbüttel 1099 [W2] (Wolfenbüttel Cod. Guelf. 1099 Helmst.) French manuscript | after 1250 A.D.

These three manuscripts date from later than the original Magnus Liber, but careful study has revealed many details regarding origin and development. "Evidence of lost Notre Dame manuscripts, including the names of their owners, is plentiful indeed", tracing back to year 1456 when manuscript F first appeared in the library of Piero de' Medici. Of the two others, referred to as W1 & W2, both in the Herzog August Bibliothek (Ducal Library), the first is thought to have originated in the cathedral priory of St Andrews, Scotland, and less is known about W2. Catalogues referring to other lost copies attest to the wide diffusion through Western Europe of the repertoire later called ars antiqua.

Heinrich Husmann summarizes that "these manuscripts, then, do not represent any more the original state of the Magnus Liber, but rather enlarged forms of it, differing from each other. In fact, these manuscripts embody different stylistic developments of the Magnus Liber itself, particularly in the field of composition mentioned by Anonymous IV, the clausula. This is born out by the differing versions of the discantus parts". Husmann also notes that a comparison of the repertory contained in the three manuscripts shows there "are a great many pieces common to all three sources" and that "the most reasonable attitude is obviously to consider the pieces in common to all three sources as the original body, consequently as the true Magnus Liber organi".

== Contributors to the Liber ==
It is unknown whether the Magnus Liber had one sole contributor, though it is noted by scholars that large parts were composed by Léonin (1135–c.1200) and this conclusion is drawn from the writings of Anonymous IV. Though it is a controversial topic among scholars, some believe parts of the Magnus Liber organi may have been revised by Pérotin (fl. 1200), while others such as Heinrich Husmann note that the finding is from 'the rather slim report of Anonymous IV' and that 'as for its connections with Notre Dame Cathedral in Paris, the name of Pérotin alone is adduced' in connection with his books having only been used. This 'by no means confirms that Pérotin himself was active at Notre Dame, or anywhere else in Paris for that matter'.

The music from the Liber has been published in modern times by William Waite (1954), Hans Tischler (1989), and by Edward Roesner (1993–2009).

== Styles and Genres of the Repertoire ==
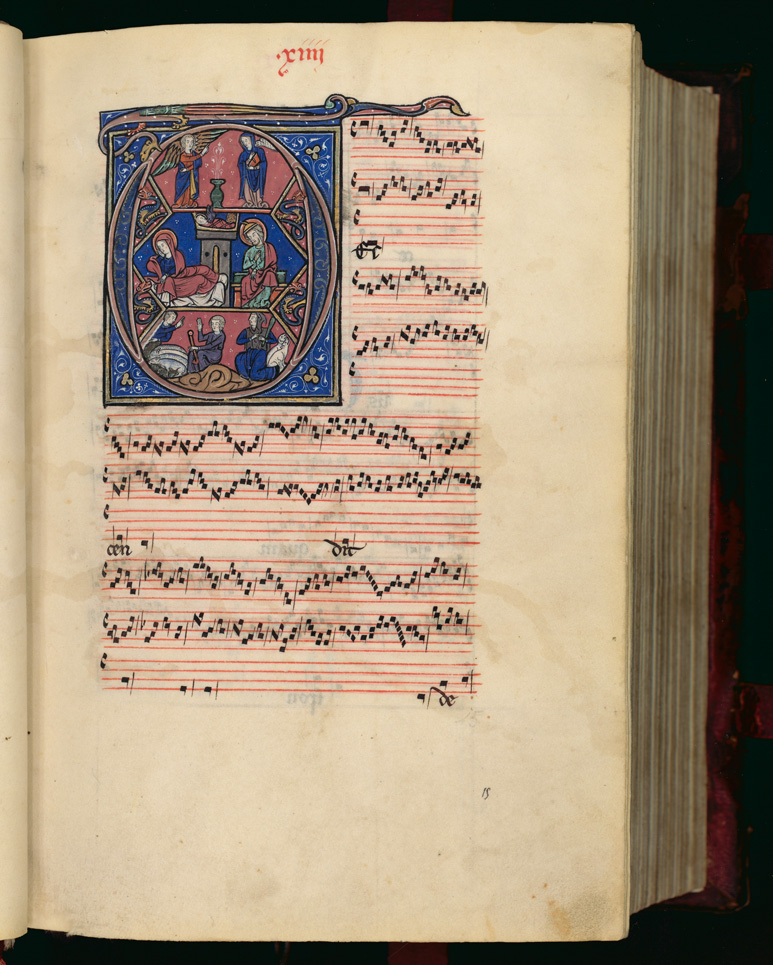
Folio 8 of manuscript F

The early music of Notre Dame cathedral represents a transitional time for Western culture. This time of change coincided with the architectural innovation that produced the structure of the Cathedral itself (earliest start of construction in 1163). A handful of surviving manuscripts demonstrate the evolution of polyphonic elaboration of the liturgical plainchant that was used at the cathedral every day throughout the year. While the concept of combining voices in harmony to enrich plainsong chant was not new, there lacked the established and codified musical theory techniques to enable the rational construction of such pieces.

The Magnus Liber represents a step in the development of Western music between plainchant and the intricate polyphony of the later thirteenth and fourteenth centuries (see Machaut and Ars Nova). The music of the Magnus Liber displays a connection to the emerging Gothic style of architecture; just as ornate cathedrals were built to house God in the Most Holy Sacrament, organa were written to elaborate Gregorian chant.

The innovations at Notre Dame consisted of a system of musical notation which included patterns of short and long musical notes known as longs and breves. This system is referred to as mensural music as it demonstrates the beginning of "measured time" in music, organizing lengths of pitches within plainchant and later, the motet genre. In the organi of the Magnus Liber, one voice sang the notes of the Gregorian chant elongated to enormous length called the tenor (from Latin 'to hold'), but was also known as the vox principalis. As many as three voices, known as the vox organalis (or vinnola vox, the "vining voice") were notated above the tenor, with quicker lines moving and weaving together, a style also known as florid organum. The development from a single line of music (monophony) to one where multiple lines all carried the same weight (polyphony) is shown through the writing of organa. The practice of keeping a slow moving "tenor" line continued into secular music, and the words of the original chant survived in some cases as well. One of the most common genres in the Magnus Liber is the clausula, which are "sections where, in discant style, the tenor uses rhythmic patterns as well as the upper part". These sections of polyphony were substituted into longer organa. The extant manuscripts provide a number of notational challenges for modern editors since they contain only the polyphonic sections to which the monophonic chant must be added.
