= M. leoninus =

M. leoninus may refer to:

- Megalomyrmex leoninus, an ant species in the genus Megalomyrmex
- Mermessus leoninus, a spider species in the genus Mermessus

== See also ==
- Leoninus (disambiguation)
