= Leoninus =

Leoninus may refer to:

- Léonin (fl. 1150s—? 1201), the first known significant composer of polyphonic organum
- Elbertus Leoninus (1519 or 1520–1598), Dutch jurist and statesman who helped negotiate the Pacification of Ghent

== Species Latin names ==
- Charaxes leoninus, a butterfly species in the genus Charaxes
- Pluteus leoninus, the lion shield, a mushroom found growing on dead wood in Europe and North Africa
- Thalassius leoninus, a spider species in the genus Thalassius

== See also ==
- Leonina (disambiguation)
- Leonine (disambiguation)
- Leoninum
