= Binaria =

Binaria may refer to:

- Binary number
- In music notation, a two note ligature
- A musical unit formed between Japanese singers Annabel and Nagi Yanagi
