= M. leonina =

M. leonina may refer to:

- Macaca leonina, the northern pig-tailed macaque, a primate species
- Melibe leonina, the hooded nudibranch or the lion nudibranch, a predatory sea slug species
- Mirounga leonina, the southern elephant seal, an elephant seal species

== See also ==
- Leonina (disambiguation)
