= Leonine =

Leonine may refer to:

== Literature ==
- Leonine Prayers, 1884–1965
- Leonine Sacramentary, a seventh-century codex
- Leonine verse, in Medieval Latin poetry
- Leonine, a minor character in Shakespeare's Pericles, Prince of Tyre

== Places in Rome ==
- Leonine City
- Leonine College, for priests

== Other uses ==
- Leonine (coin), a debased penny used in England
- Leonine facies, a facial deformity
- Leonine Holding, a German media company

== See also ==
- Lenine (disambiguation)
- Leonina (disambiguation)
