= Pluteo 29.1 =

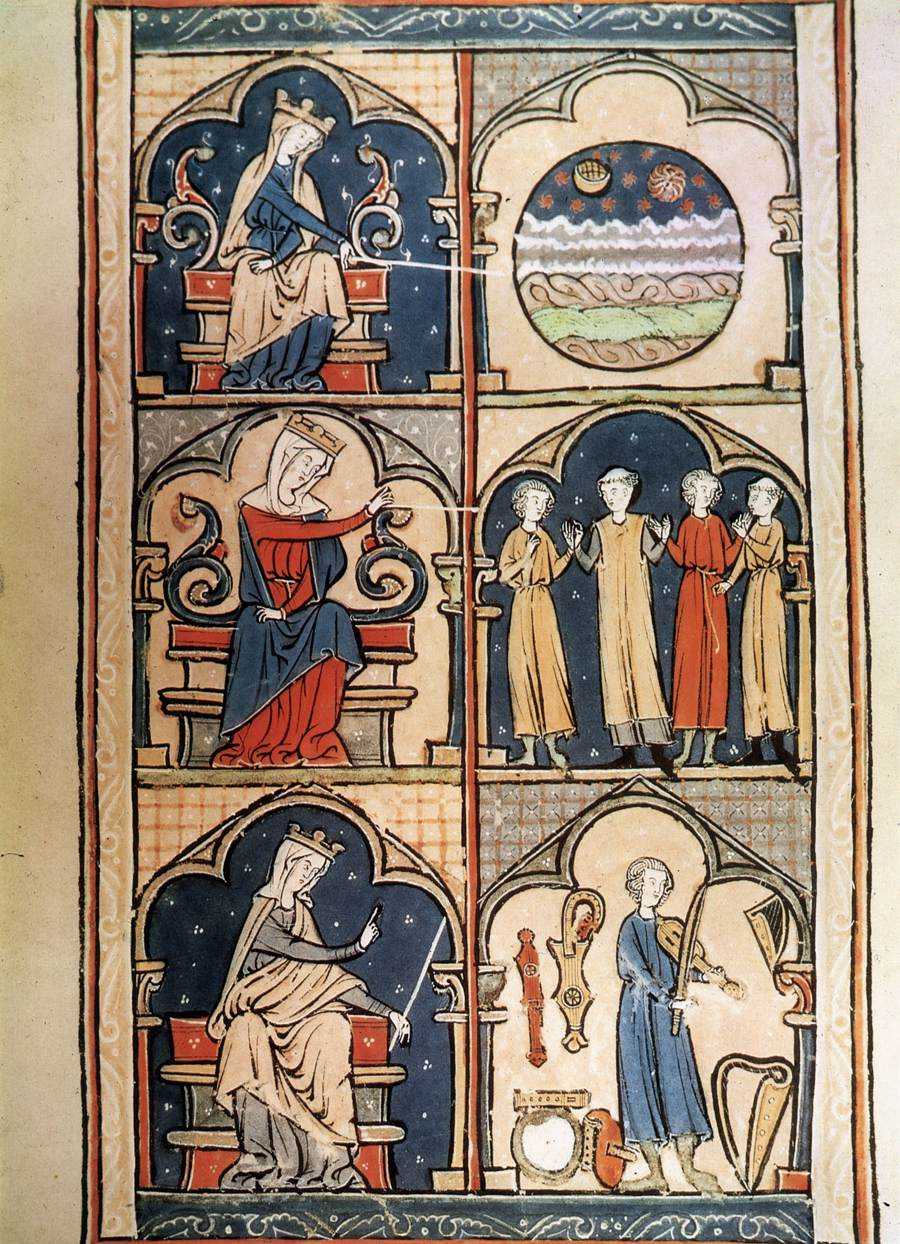
Circa 1245-1255, Paris. The classification of music according to Boethius, illustrated. Folio 1v from Pluteus 29.1

Pluteo 29.1, also known as Pluteus 29.1, or simply the Florence Manuscript, is an illuminated manuscript in the Laurentian Library of Florence. Along with the Florence Manuscript, the Laurentian Library contains 11,000 other manuscripts.

The manuscript is believed to have been produced by the workshop of Johannes Grusch in Paris during the mid-thirteenth century, probably between 1245 and 1255. It contains the largest extant collection of music in the Notre-Dame style, mainly organa, conductus, and motets. This is the most complete source for the music of the Notre Dame school. The illumination consists of thirteen historiated initials and one full-page miniature which serves as its frontispiece.

The manuscript was issued in facsimile by Institute of Medieval Music in 1967.

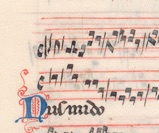
Folio 150 verso of Pluteo 29.1, showing the clausula "Nusmido," the earliest known example of retrograde in music

== See also ==
- Squarcialupi Codex
