= Lenine =

Lenine may refer to:

== Populated places ==
- Lenine, Crimea, also known as Yedi Quyu, an urban-type settlement
- Lenine Raion, also known as Yedi Quyu Raion, a district of Crimea
- The former name of Dovha Hreblya, Kyiv Oblast

== Other ==
- Lenine (musician), Brazilian singer-songwriter
- Musée Lenine, a museum devoted to Vladimir Lenin, in Paris, France

== See also ==
- Lenin (disambiguation)
- Lenino (disambiguation)
- Leonine (disambiguation)
