= Gradual =

Christian liturgical chant

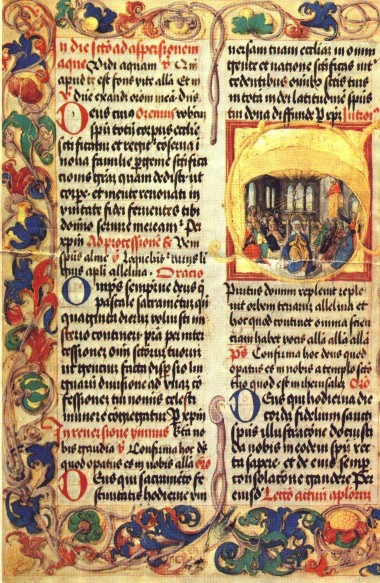
Gradual of King John I Albert of Poland in the Wawel Cathedral's Sacristy

The gradual (Latin: graduale or responsorium graduale) is a certain chant or hymn in liturgical Christian worship. It is practiced in the Catholic Mass, Lutheran Divine Service, Anglican service and other traditions. It gets its name from the Latin gradus (meaning "step") because it was once chanted on the step of the ambo or altar. It is customarily placed after a reading of scripture.

In the Tridentine Mass, it is sung after the reading or chanting of the epistle and before the Alleluia, or, during penitential seasons, before the tract. In the Mass of Paul VI, the gradual is usually replaced with the responsorial psalm. Although the Gradual remains an option in the Mass of Paul VI, its use is extremely rare outside monasteries. The gradual is part of the proper of the Mass.

A gradual can also refer to a book collecting all the musical items of the Mass. The official such book for the Roman Rite is the Roman Gradual (Graduale Romanum). Other such books include the Dominican Gradual.

== History ==
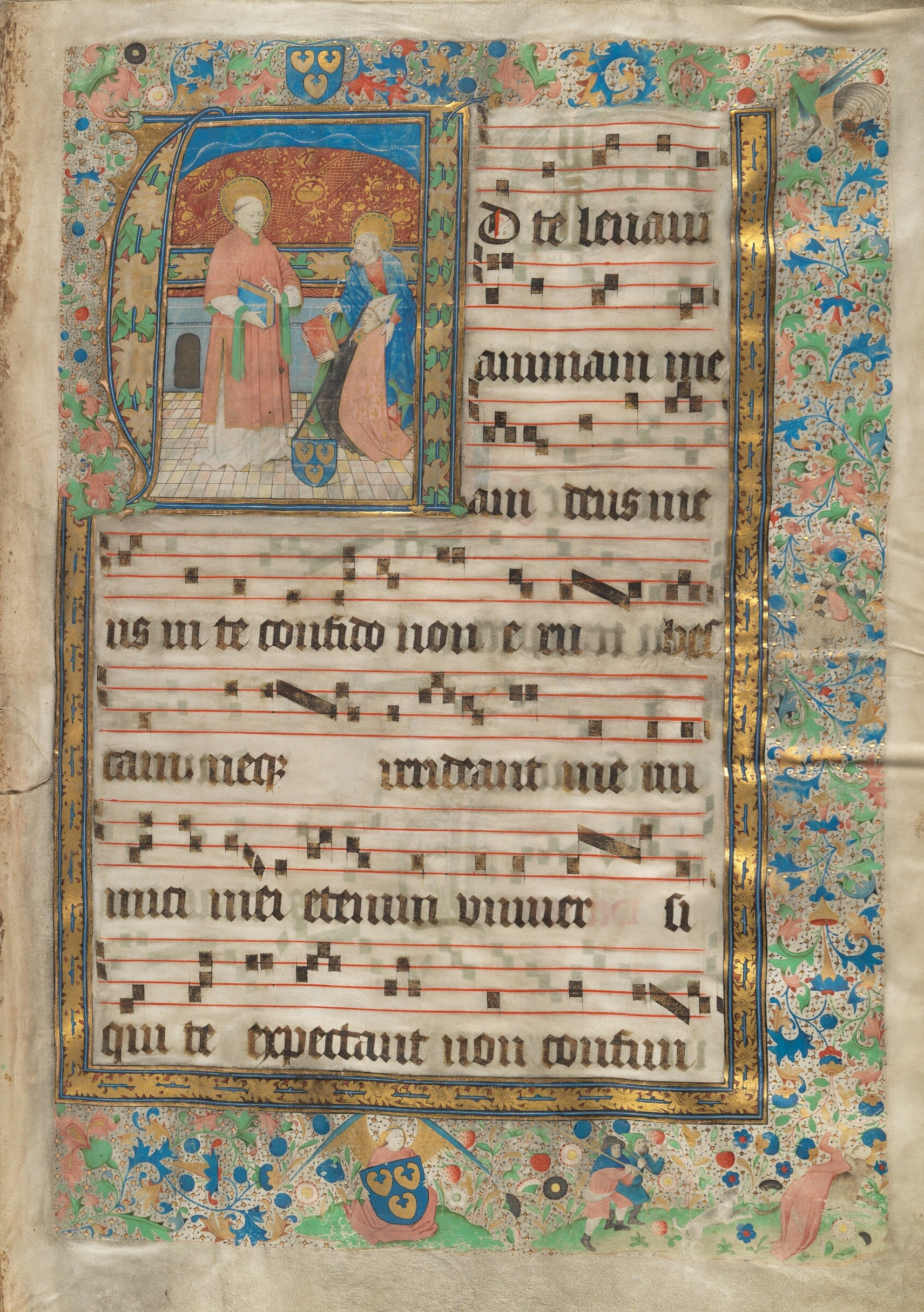
Excerpt from the manuscript of the gradual of the abbey of St.-Baafs in Ghent. Made in 1469.

The Gradual, like the Alleluia and Tract, is one of the responsorial chants of the Mass. Responsorial chants derive from early Christian traditions of singing choral refrains called responds between psalm verses. According to the Catholic Encyclopedia, it (and the associated Alleluia or Tract) is the oldest of the chants of the Proper of the Mass, and, in contrast to the Introit, Offertory, and Communion, the only one that was not sung to accompany some other liturgical action, historically a procession. Until about the fifth century, it included singing a whole psalm. They were sung in the form of a psalmus responsorius, i.e. the whole text was chanted by a reader appointed for this purpose. For some time before Pope Gregory I, to sing these psalms was a privilege of deacons at Rome, a privilege he suppressed in 595. The people answered each clause or verse with an acclamation. This apparently dates back to the synagogue tradition, and can even be seen in the structure of some Psalms (such as 136|135). Originally, there was a psalm sung between each reading, of which in the fifth century there were three (Prophets, Epistle, and Gospel). When the Old Testament reading was later dropped, the other two psalms became the Gradual and Alleluia, ordinarily sung one after another, until the 1970 Missal restored the three readings on Sundays and Solemnities.

The modern Gradual always consists of two psalm verses, generally (but not always) taken from the same psalm. There are a few Graduals that use a book of scripture other than the Psalms (for example, the verse for the Feast of the Immaculate Conception is from the Book of Judith), or even non-scriptural verses (for example, the first verse in the Requiem Mass).

The Gradual is believed to have been so named because it was sung on the step (Latin: gradus) of the altar, or perhaps because the deacon was mounting the steps of the ambo for the reading or singing of the Gospel. However, early sources use the form gradale ("graded" or "distinguished"), and the Alia Musica (c. 900) uses the term antiphona gradalis for the Introit.

== Liturgical use ==
The Gradual is to be sung after the reading of the Epistle. It is ordinarily followed by the Alleluia or Tract, but in Masses that have more readings than normal, such as during Lent, these may be separated by another reading, or, if there are more than three readings, there is more than one Gradual, and finally the Tract, to separate each reading. In Eastertide, the Gradual is normally omitted, and a second Alleluia is sung in its place, except within the Octave of Easter. In what is now the ordinary form of the Roman Rite, the Responsorial Psalm normally takes the place of the Gradual, and is sung after the first reading, but it may be replaced by the Gradual.

In the Tridentine Mass, the celebrant himself reads the Gradual with the Alleluia, Tract, or Sequence immediately after he has read the Epistle, and at the same place, even if the choir sings it too. There is no rule for the distribution of its parts within the choir. All may be sung straight through by the whole choir, but it is more common to divide the texts so that some parts are sung by one or two cantors. A common arrangement is that the cantors sing the first words of the Gradual (to the asterisk in the choir-books), the choir continues, and the cantors sing the verse. Normally it is all sung to plainsong.

In other churches and rites, there are fragments of the psalms once sung between the lessons that correspond to the Roman Gradual. Their placement and structure depend strongly on how many readings there are. In the Byzantine Rite the reader of the epistle first chants "the Psalm of David" and then the "Prokeimenon of the Apostle", both short fragments of psalms. The Armenian Rite, which has kept the older arrangement of three lessons, includes between each a fragment called the Saghmos Jashu (Psalm of dinnertime) and the Mesedi (mesodion), again a verse or two from a psalm. The Nestorians use three verses of psalms each followed by three Alleluias (this group is called Zumara) after the Epistle. The present Ambrosian Rite sometimes has a Prophecy before the Epistle, in which case there follows the Psalmellus, two or three verses from a psalm, which corresponds to the Gradual. The Mozarabic Rite has three lessons, with a psalm (Psallendo) sung between the first two. Among Protestant churches, Lutherans sing a Gradual either between the Old Testament and the Epistle or the Epistle and the Gospel readings during the Divine Service.

== Musical form and style ==
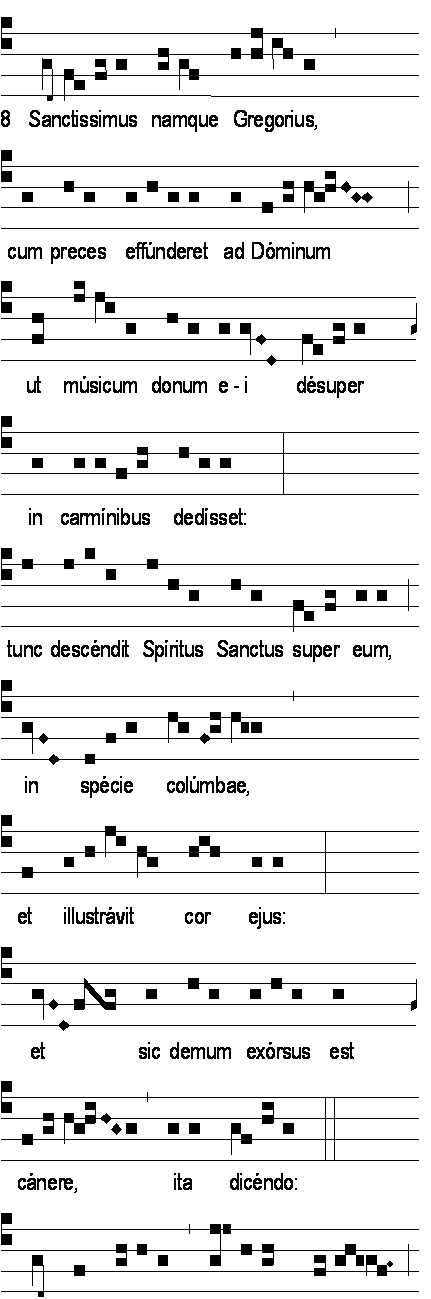
Sanctissimus namque Gregorius, from the Vatican edition of the Graduale Romanum.

The usual form of the Gradual is a single respond with a solo verse, although a final repetition of the respond was found up to the Renaissance and is still permitted by the Liber usualis.

Graduals are among the most florid and melismatic of all Gregorian chants; Clamaverunt iusti, for example, has melismas with up to 66 notes. Graduals as a group are also notable for melismas that stress one or two pitches, both through repeated notes and repercussive neumes. Both the verse and the respond tend to be similar in style, excepting a tendency for the verse to have a higher tessitura.

Like Tracts, most Graduals show clear signs of centonization, a process of composition in which an extended vocabulary of stock musical phrases are woven together. Some phrases are only used for incipits, some only for cadences, and some only in the middle of a musical line. The Gregorian Graduals can be organized into musical families that share common musical phrases. Although nearly half of the Gregorian Graduals belong to a family of related chants in the fifth mode, the most famous family of Graduals are those of the second mode, commonly called the Iustus ut palma group after one representative chant. The Graduals of the Old Roman chant fall similarly into centonization families, including a family corresponding to the Iustus ut palma group.

== Polyphonic settings ==
Graduals were among the parts of the Mass most frequently composed as organa, including both the St. Martial School and the Notre Dame School. Ordinarily the parts that were sung by the soloist (the beginning of the respond and the verse) are the only parts so set, while the choral parts continued to be performed in plainsong. In 1198, Odo de Sully, Bishop of Paris, authorized polyphonic performances of Graduals, including Pérotin's famous four-part organa, Sederunt principes for St. Stephen's Day and Viderunt omnes for Christmas.

== Book ==
The term "Gradual" (or Graduale) also refers to certain books compiling the musical items of the Mass. A Gradual is generally distinguished from the Missal by omitting the spoken items, and including the music for the sung parts. It includes both the Ordinary and Proper, as opposed to the Kyrial, which includes only the Ordinary, and the Cantatory, which includes only the responsorial chants.

Originally the book was called an antiphonale missarum ("Antiphonal of the Mass"). Graduals, like the later Cantatory, may have originally included only the responsorial items, the Gradual, Alleluia and Tract.

== Footnotes ==
1. Apel, Willi, ed (1972). Harvard Dictionary of Music, 2nd edition. Cambridge, Harvard University Press. Page 350.
2. Abbaye Saint-Pierre de Solesmes (1979). Graduale Triplex. Tournai, Belgium: Desclée & Socii. ISBN 2-85274-094-X.
3. Apel, Willi (1990). Gregorian Chant. Bloomington, IN: Indiana University Press. ISBN 0-253-20601-4.
4. Hoppin, Richard (1978). Medieval Music. New York: W. W. Norton & Company. ISBN 0-393-09090-6.
5. Hiley, David (1995). Western Plainchant: A Handbook. New York: Oxford University Press Inc. ISBN 0-19-816572-2.
6. Apel, Willi, ed (1972). Harvard Dictionary of Music, 2nd edition. Cambridge, Harvard University Press. Page 350.
