= Léonin =

12th-century French composer

Léonin (also Leoninus, Leonius, Leo; fl. 1163–1190?) was the first known significant composer of polyphonic organum. He was probably French, probably lived and worked in Paris at the Notre-Dame Cathedral and was the earliest member of the Notre Dame school of polyphony and the ars antiqua style who is known by name, thanks to the writer known as Anonymous IV. Though no further identification is certain, the name "Leoninus" and its Latin diminutive Leo have the French equivalents Léonin/Léo.

== Léonin's Magnus liber organi ==
All our knowledge about him starts from the writing of a 13th century student at the cathedral known as Anonymous IV, an Englishman who left a treatise on theory and who mentions Léonin as the composer of the Magnus Liber organi, the "great book of organum".

And note that master Leoninus was the best organista (composer?/singer? of organum), he made (composed?) the great organum-book about the Gradual and about the Antiphonary in order to expand the Divine Service. This book remained in use until the time of the great Perotinus who abridged it and composed clausulae or many other sections in a better way, because he was the best discantor (composer?/singer? of discant) and better than Leoninus, but this cannot be said about the subtlety of his organum. (Note: Et nota, quod magister Leoninus, secundum quod dicebatur, fuit optimus organista, qui fecit magnum librum organi de gradali et antifonario pro servitio divino multiplicando. Et fuit in usu usque ad tempus Perotini Magni, qui abbreviavit eundem et fecit clausulas sive puncta plurima meliora, quoniam optimus discantor erat, et melior quam Leoninus erat. Sed hoc non [est] dicendum de subtilitate organi etc. (Reckow 1967, i:46))

Much of the Magnus Liber (as it is present from later manuscripts after Pérotin) is devoted to clausulae—melismatic portions of Gregorian chant which were extracted into separate pieces where the original note values of the chant were greatly slowed down and a fast-moving upper part is superimposed. Léonin may have created a new level of Parisian florid organum which was called «organum purum» by Anonymus IV and praised for its delicate and subtle style, and he founded the cathedral school Notre-Dame de Paris whose achievements were documented by the Magnus liber. The use of rhythmic modes and the probable inventor of modal notation was likely Pérotin who revised Léonin's Magnus liber by replacing sections of discant by rhythmic clausulae which were collected in an appendix, either to vary the organa or to compose motets over them, as described by Anonymus IV.

Still William Waite wrote in his doctoral thesis (1954): "It was Léonin's incomparable achievement to introduce a rational system of rhythm into polyphonic music for the first time, and, equally important, to create a method of notation expressive of this rhythm." This outdated approach is not aware of the nature of the preserved manuscripts, but might explain editions whose editors project later rhythmic notation systems on eleventh and twelfth-century sources (which still concerns Léonin's school), but a version "in use until Pérotin" mentioned by Anonymus IV has not been found yet.

== The florid organum style of Léonin's school ==
The Magnus Liber was not necessarily intended for liturgical use, it collected organa which became a model for educated precentors of the Notre Dame school to embellish chant of the gradual and the antiphonary on highly ranked feasts for Apostles, Virgin Mary, Christmas, Easter and Pentecost, but it only referred to the soloistic parts of the chant without being able to replace the books gradual or antiphonary (in alleluia verse and responsorium only the incipit before the choir responds, and afterwards the short psalm verse between the responsaria). The usual chant sung «cum organo» were genres connected with scriptural lessons like the reponsorium gradual concluding the epistle and alleluia verse opening the Gospel reading during the mass or the last responsorium prolixum concluding one of the three nocturns of the midnight vigil (three responsoria were usual during the nocturn at Notre Dame cathedral). Another genre for organum was Benedicamus domino which concluded many celebrations throughout a higher feast.

According to Anonymous IV master Léonin was the finest organum-singer and under his instruction the "great book of organum" for the gradual and antiphoner was written to make divine services richer. Unfortunately, the unrevised version of the Magnus Liber just with two-part organa—so-called «organa dupla»—in the early style of Léonin's school has not survived.

Although little is known about actual performance practice, the organal voice was definitely a soloist who had carefully memorised the cantus sung by the voice or voices of the tenor (called this way, because they had often to hold the notes of the cantus for quite a while). Even during an unembellished monophonic version these parts were reserved to the precentor, at the beginning simply to coordinate the singers of the choir. The earlier custom documented by the Winchester Troper was quite different, the early organa of the eleventh century set the responsoria as a whole «cum organo», but it is not documented elsewhere. Even the earliest organa of Chartres, Fleury or Paris (Saint-Maur-des-Fossés) were just about the parts of the soloist.

=== Treatise ars organi ===
There is a treatise called Ars organi ("The art of organum") which had been survived in a copy of 1220 (V-CVbav cod. Ottob. lat. 3025, ff.45r-50v), but its content likely can be dated back to the circle around Léonin at the Parisian Notre Dame school during the 1170s. «Ars» in a scholastic context referred to Aristotle (ἡ τέχνῃ) who was often quoted by Parisian theorists. It was about the distinction between the potential of being (δύναμις) and the selection of the moment (θέσις), for instance making an organum during a celebration. Even if the organum singer could give a sign to the singers of the tenor, when to continue to the next note of the cantus, the singer needed to memorize the cantus very well and with care before-hand:

Organum est cantus subsequens precedentem, quia cantor debet precedere organizator uero sequi, et cantor debet primitus finire. Quia nihil ualet organum per se nisi aliquis cantus sit cum organo.
Organum is always following an already existing cantus, because the cantus-singer has to go before, but the organum-singer follows, and the cantus-singer has also to end first. Thus, the organum for itself has no value, unless there might be any cantus with the organum.

— Ars organi (Godt & Rivera 1984, 293)

The quotation can be easily misunderstood, it is not about real-time in the sense of: first that singer then the other, it is about musical architecture and construction. The organum-singer, «organista» or «organizator» builds up on the fundament of the cantus, not the other way round. After that the quality of "concordances" (the author's term for consonant intervals) are defined according to the Pythagorean tuning of Western plainchant and its modal logic:

Vnde sciendum quod nulla vox supra perfecte sonat nisi in diapason. Vnde diapente et diatessaron concordant, quia faciunt melodiam aliquam, et discordant, quia non sunt in perfecta proportione.
From there it is to know that no upper voice sounds as perfectly as the one in diapason [2:1]. Thus, diapente [3:2] and diatessaron [4:3] sound together, because they make any melody, while they sound apart, because they are not in perfect proportion.

— Ars organi (Godt & Rivera 1984, 294)

The author shows the same preference for the Greek terms of the intervals octave, fifth and fourth like Guido of Arezzo, but makes a distinction among these intervals classified by the latter as "suitable connections of the voices" (aptae copulationes vocum), the so-called characteristics of vocal sound (affinitates vocum). Fourth and fifth were "discordant" enough to make the melody move in the horizontal direction, but the octave was in fact so "concordant", that it stopped the horizontal movement of the melody. This was new, because Aquitanian polyphony in the manuscripts of the Saint Martial school was not constructed this way. The experiments in Aquitaine went beyond such strict rules, unison at least happened quite often inbetween and allowed also the upper voice to descend under the cantus or go along with it in parallel fourths under the cantus (and it is probably the reason, why unison was not mentioned here).

The subtlety of florid organum in Paris was, that tenor and organum might meet on unison, but the organum still needed time to go up to the octave which usually happened in organa of the Magnus liber. But having this time, it was less a matter of composition, but of improvisation ruled by a formalised communication between the singers of both parts. The beginning of a «membrum» (the smallest section in the construction of plainchant going along with its text) and end was marked and ritualised by typical ornaments. The organum usually started before the cantus, but this was an ornament called «principium ante principium» ("the beginning before the beginning"). The first part of an organum was constructed over the short intonation of the precentor. In the monophonic form this short beginning of the foresinger was needed to organise that the singers of the choir or schola find together. But singing the same «cum organo» required now again to coordinate the singers of the organum section, thus, the organum was allowed to start before the cantus as the name of this ornament said. For this reason, there is no doubt that the organum part was performed by a soloist, and the subtlety of the organum depended on her or his skills and experience. The Notre Dame school was there to teach these things.

Concerning the manuscripts of the Magnus liber, the notation was highly formalised. The longely shaped note at the beginning simply indicated: here is the place to make the ornament «principium ante principium». Earlier sources, even if they were just fragments or a few pages like this organum treatise, were far more instructive, because such ornaments were written out in more detail. This also makes the organum treatise so interesting.

It is composed of a theoretical introduction (f.45r), the second part «De regulis organi» has 344 examples about different sound steps (translated from Klaus-Jürgen Sachs' term "Klangschrittlehre", ff.45r-48v), and three realisations of organa in an appendix about the alleluia verse «Hic martinus» (St Martin on 15 November) of the gradual, and two responsoria prolixa of the antiphonary for St Nicholas (6 December) «Operibus suis» and St Peter (29 June) «Petre amas me» (ff.49r-50v). The sound examples also treated the subject of pre-modal discant sections needed during melismatic sections of the cantus (f.48v, left column line 5).

A look at the organa in the appendix shows very clear features of the improvised form of «organum purum», especially the ritualised communication between «organizator» and «cantor». The unison was often used in the conclusion of an organum section without climbing up to the octave, but even a subsection—aiming at the «discordans diapente» (F—c)—had «principium ante principium» as well as «paenultima» (G—a) ornaments progressing the first word «Voce» and indicating the change to the second syllable (beginning of the solo verse of the responsorium «Operibus suis» for St Nicholas):

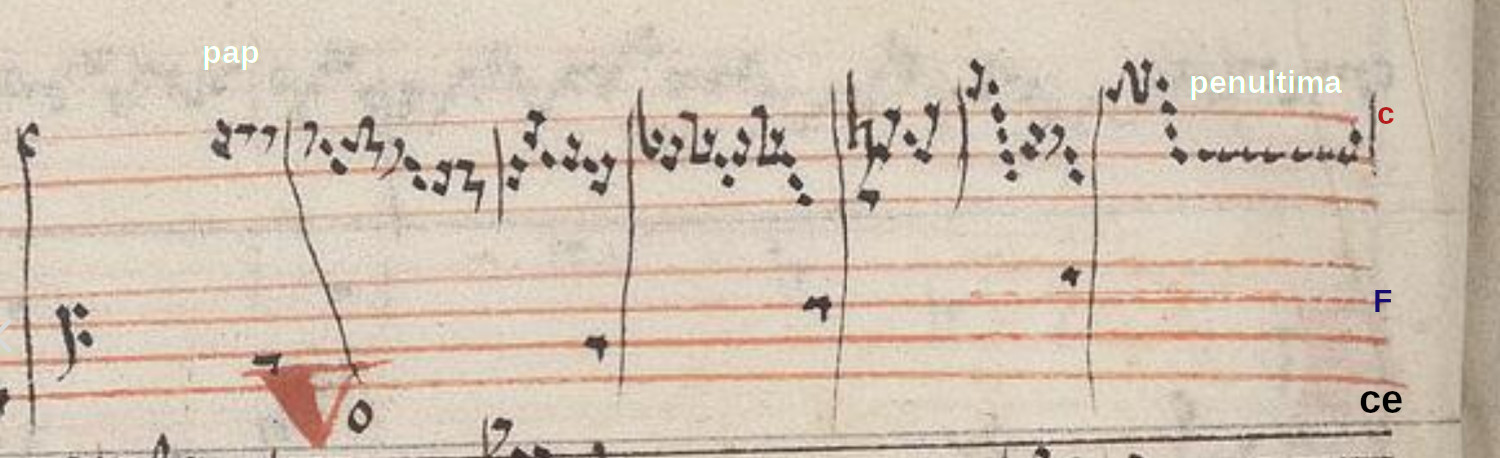
Organum over the solo verse «Voce quippe de celo» of the responsorium prolixum for Saint Nicholas (6 December) in the appendix of the Vatican organum treatise (V-CVbav Ottob. lat. 3025, f.49v)

This source reveals that florid organa were still improvised in Léonin's school and particularly original and skilled versions had been documented by Léonin's students with square notation on red staff in the Magnus liber like in the appendix of the treatise ars organi.

=== Léonin in an edition of the Magnus liber ===
While he worked on his transcription and edition of the Magnus liber (1993-2009), Edward Roesner tried to establish the earliest layer of Léonin's Magnus liber by a comparative analysis of the organa made over the alleluia verse «Adorabo ad templum», and over the responsoria prolixa «Non corturbetur» and «Dum complerentur» together with the Vatican organum treatise.

The two Léonin CDs recorded by a group called "Red Byrd", consisting in this case of Joe Potter and Richard Wistreich, used the edition by Edward Roesner.

== Identity ==
The musicologist Craig M. Wright believes that Léonin may have been the same person as a contemporaneous Parisian poet, Leonius, after whom Leonine verse may have been named. This could make Léonin's use of meter even more significant. Another possible suspect is an Henricus Leonellus, who was at the Abbey of St. Victor c. 1163-1192.

== See also ==
Medieval music.

== Source ==
- "Rome, Biblioteca Apostolica Vaticana, fondo Ottoboniano latino, cod. 3025, ff.45r-50v". "Vatican organum treatise" («incipit ars organi») (about 1220).

== Editions ==
- Godt, Irving; Rivera, Benito, eds. (1984). "The Vatican Organum Treatise: A Color Reproduction, Transcription, and Translation". Gordon Athol Anderson (1929-1981) in memoriam. Vol. 2. Henryville: IMM. pp. 264–345. ISBN 0-931902-29-0.
- Reckow, Fritz, ed. (1967). Der Musiktraktat des Anonymus 4. Beihefte zum Archiv für Musikwissenschaft. Vol. 4–5. Wiesbaden: Steiner.
- Roesner, Edward H.; Everist, Mark; Payne, Thomas B.; MacCarthy, Evan Angus; Baltzer, Rebecca Anne; Huglo, Michel, eds. (1993–2009). Le magnus liber organi de Notre-Dame de Paris. Musica Gallica. Vol. 1–7. Monaco: Édition de l'Oiseau-Lyre.

== Studies ==
- Flotzinger, Rudolf (2007). Von Leonin zu Perotin : der musikalische Paradigmenwechel in Paris um 1210 [From Léonin to Pérotin: the musical paradigm shift in Paris about 1210]. Bern: Lang. ISBN 978-3-03910-987-6.
- Flotzinger, Rudolf (2003). Leoninus musicus und der Magnus liber organi. Kassel: Bärenreiter. ISBN 3-7618-1736-3.
- Gross, Guillaume (2005). "The Subtlety of Organum [Review of vol. 6 of Roesner's edition about organa dupla in W2]". Early Music. 33 (2). Translated by Nicholas Bell: 337–340. doi:10.1093/em/cah080. JSTOR 3519463.
- Haines, John (2006). "Anonymous IV as an Informant on the Craft of Music Writing". Journal of Musicology. 23 (3): 375–425. doi:10.1525/jm.2006.23.3.375. ISSN 0277-9269. JSTOR 10.1525/jm.2006.23.3.375.
- Haggh, Barbara; Huglo, Michel (2004). "Magnus liber: Maius munus. Origine et destinée du manuscrit F". Revue de Musicologie. 90: 193–230. JSTOR 4494910.
- Roesner, Edward H. (2001b). "Who 'made' the Magnus Liber?". Early Music History. 20: 227–266. JSTOR 853793.
- Sachs, Klaus-Jürgen (1971). "Zur Tradition der Klangschritt-Lehre. Die Texte mit der Formel "Si cantus ascendit..." und ihre Verwandten" [About the tradition of sound-step treatises. Texts using the formula «Si cantus ascendit...» and the related treatises]. Archiv für Musikwissenschaft. 28 (4): 233–270. doi:10.2307/930051. JSTOR 930051.
- Treitler, Leo (1983). "Der Vatikanische Organumtraktat und das Organum von Notre Dame de Paris". Basler Jahrbuch für historische Musikpraxis. 5: 23–31.
- Wright, Craig (Spring 1986). "Leoninus, Poet and Musician". Journal of the American Musicological Society. 39 (1): 1–35. doi:10.2307/831693. JSTOR 831693.
- Yudkin, Jeremy (1 October 1983). "The Rhythm of Organum Purum". Journal of Musicology. 2 (4): 355–376. doi:10.2307/763685. JSTOR 763685.
- Yudkin, Jeremy (1984). "The Anonymous of St. Emmeram and Anonymous IV on the 'Copula'". The Musical Quarterly. 70 (1): 1–22. doi:10.1093/mq/LXX.1.1. JSTOR 741921.

== Encyclopaedic introductions & handbooks ==
- Bent, Ian D. (1980). "Léonin". In Stanley Sadie (ed.). The New Grove Dictionary of Music and Musicians. Vol. 10. London: Macmillan. p. 676. ISBN 1-56159-174-2.
- Gleason, Harold; Becker, Warren (1981). Music in the Middle Ages and Renaissance. Music Literature Outlines (3rd ed.). Bloomington: Frangipani Press. ISBN 978-0-88284-379-7.
- Hoppin, Richard (1978). Medieval Music. The Norton Introduction to Music History (1st ed.). New York: W. W. Norton & Company. ISBN 978-0-393-09090-1.
- Roesner, Edward H. (2001). "Léonin". Grove Music Online. Oxford: Oxford University Press. doi:10.1093/gmo/9781561592630.article.40466. ISBN 978-1-56159-263-0. (subscription, Wikilibrary access, or UK public library membership required)
- Articles Anonymous theoretical writings, Organum, Leonin, Perotin, The New Grove Dictionary of Music and Musicians, ed. Stanley Sadie. 20 vol. London, Macmillan Publishers Ltd., 1980. (ISBN 1561591742)
