= William Waite =

American musicologist (1917–1980)

William G. Waite (October 1917, in Massachusetts – February 28, 1980) was an American musicologist.

== Biography ==
William G. Waite was born in October 1917 in Massachusetts. He was educated at Yale University. He later received his PhD in 1951. His dissertation, The Rhythm of Twelfth-Century Polyphony: its Theory and Practice outlines his ideas on modal interpretation of organum duplum. The second half of this work is a transcription of organum from the Magnus liber organi.

In 1947, Waite joined the Yale music department. He was chairman of the music department from 1965 to 1979. During his tenure, the department grew into the Yale School of Music. His textbook, The Art of Music (1962), written with Beekman Cannon and Alvin Johnson, was a popular introductory music text for many years.

Waite married. He had two daughters and a son. He died of pancreatic cancer on February 28, 1980, aged 62, at the Yale Health Center Infirmary.
