= Lenino air base =

Former military airfield in Kamchatka Krai, Russia

Lenino
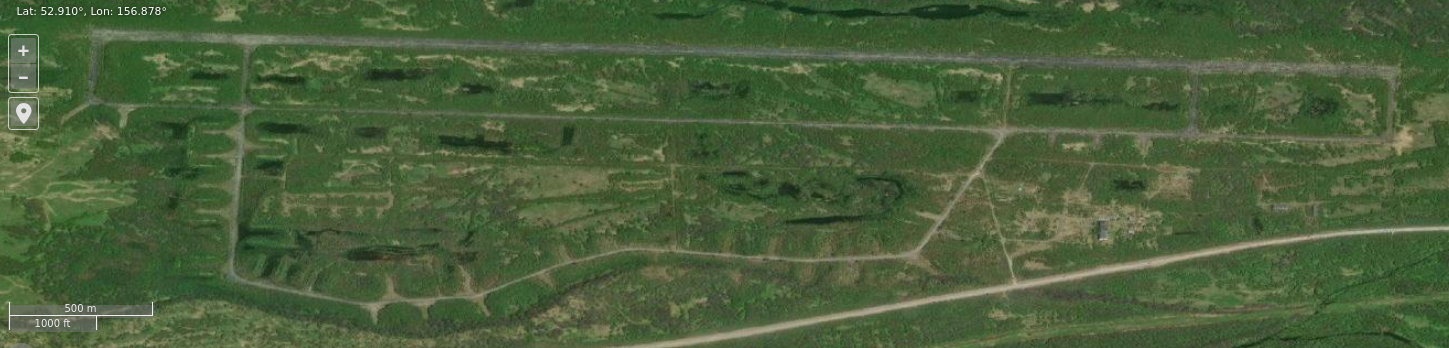
- Satellite imagery of former Lenino air base
- IATA: none; ICAO: ZA75

Summary
- Airport type: Military
- Location: Lenino
- Elevation AMSL: 203 ft / 62 m
- Coordinates: 52°54′36″N 156°52′42″E
- Interactive map of Lenino

Runways
Direction	Length		Surface
Direction	ft	m	Surface
	11,155	3,400	Concrete

Lenino (Russian: Ленино(Камчатка)) is a former air base in Kamchatka Krai, Russia located 11 km west of Lenino. It is a large abandoned military base 120 km west of Petropavlovsk, and may have been designed for Tupolev Tu-16 operations during the 1950s and 1960s. It appears to have been abandoned in the 1970s.

== See also ==
- List of Soviet Air Force bases
