= Lenino, Chekmagushevsky District, Republic of Bashkortostan =

Lenino Ленино
- Village
- Location within Bashkortostan Location within Russia
- Coordinates: 55°05′N 54°26′E
- Country: Russia
- Region: Bashkortostan
- District: Chekmagushevsky District
- Time zone: UTC+5:00

Lenino (Russian: Ленино) is a rural locality (a village) in Chekmagushevsky District, Bashkortostan, Russia. The population was 130 as of 2010. There is 1 street.

== Geography ==
Lenino is located 19 km southwest of Chekmagush (the district's administrative centre) by road. Novobaltachevo is the nearest rural locality.
