= Lenino, Amur Oblast =

Lenino Ленино
- Selo
- Location within Amur Oblast Location within Russia
- Coordinates: 49°48′N 129°19′E
- Country: Russia
- Region: Amur Oblast
- District: Zavitinsky District
- Time zone: UTC+9:00

Lenino (Russian: Ленино) is a rural locality (a selo) in Antonovsky Selsoviet of Zavitinsky District, Amur Oblast, Russia. The population was 38 as of 2018. There are 3 streets.

== Geography ==
Lenino is located 44 km south of Zavitinsk (the district's administrative centre) by road. Raychikhinsk is the nearest rural locality.
