= Leonina =

Leonina may refer to:

- Leonina (coin), a coin issued under Pope Leo XII : see Papal mint
- Civitas Leonina, the Leonine City, a part of the city of Rome
- Leo and Nina, twins

== See also ==
- Leonine (disambiguation)
- Leoninus (disambiguation)
- Leoninum
