= Leonine verse =

Versification based on internal rhyme

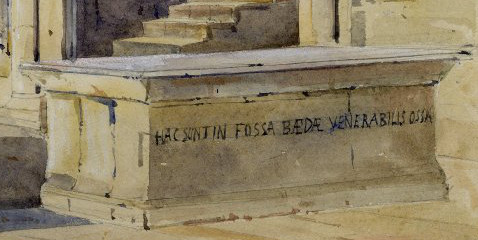
A detail of a watercolor by Augustus Hare showing the Latin Leonine verse inscribed on Bede's tomb.

Leonine verse is a type of versification based on an internal rhyme between a word within the line before a caesura and a word at the end, and commonly used in Latin verse of the European Middle Ages. The proliferation of such conscious rhymes, uncommon in Classical Latin poetry, is traditionally attributed to a probably apocryphal monk Leonius, who is supposed to be the author of a history of the Old Testament (Historia Sacra) preserved in the Bibliothèque Nationale of Paris. It is possible that this Leonius is the same person as Leoninus, a Benedictine musician of the twelfth century, in which case he would not have been the original proliferator of the form.

In English Leonine verse is sometimes referred to disparagingly as "jangling verse", for example by 19th-century antiquaries and classical purists, who considered it absurd, coarse, and a corruption of and offensive to the high ideals of classical literature. William Shakespeare used it in a drunken song sung by Caliban in The Tempest.

== Examples ==
=== Latin ===
==== Pre-medieval ====
Leonine verses from Virgil's Eclogues 8.80 (39 B.C.):

Limus ut hic durescit, et haec ut cera liquescit

Leonine verses from Ovid's Metamorphoses (A.D. 8):

Quem mare carpentem, substrictaque crura gerentem

[...]

Quot caelum stellas, tot habet tua Roma puellas

[...]

Quaerebant flavos per nemus omne favos

==== Medieval and post-medieval ====
Leonine verses from the tomb of the Venerable Bede in the Gallee Chapel of Durham Cathedral, possibly from the 8th century:

HAC SUNT IN FOSSA BÆDÆ VENERABILIS OSSA

Leonine verses in the mosaic on top of the marble ciborio in the Chiesa di Santa Maria in Portico in Campitelli:

Hic est illa piae Genitricis Imago Mariae
Quae discumbenti Gallae patuit metuenti

Leonine verses by Marbodius of Rennes, De Lapidibus, around 1040:

Lingua nequit fari mens nulla valet meditari
Quantus mente furor mihi est, quibus ignibus uror

Leonine verses in half rhyme in the Basilica di Santa Maria Assunta in Torcello, around 1100:

Formula virtutis Maris astrum, Porta salutis
Prole Maria levat quos conjuge subdidit Eva
Sum deus atq[ue] caro patris et sum matris imago
non piger ad lapsum set flentis p[ro]ximus adsum

Leonine verses in mosaic in the apse of the Cathedral of Cefalù, around 1150:

Factus homo Factor hominis factique Redemptor
Iudico corporeus corpora corda Deus

Leonine verses in the Portale dell'abbazia di Leno dell'abate Gunterio, in the year 1200:

HAEC NON LENENSIS TELLUS FERTUR LEONENSIS
CUI NON LENONES NOMEN POSUERE LEONES
FORMA LEONINA SIGNANS BIS MARMORA BINA
DICITUR OFFERRE LOCA VOCE NON AUTEM RE
FELIX EST NOMEN FELIX EST NOMINIS OMEN
QUOD NON LENONES POSUERUNT IMMO LEONES

Another very famous poem in a tripart Leonine rhyme is the De Contemptu Mundi of Bernard of Cluny, whose first book begins:

Hora novissima, tempora pessima sunt, vigilemus:
Ecce minaciter, imminet arbiter, ille supremus.
Imminet imminet, ut mala terminet, æqua coronet,
Recta remuneret, anxia liberet, æthera donet.

(These current days are the worst of times: let us keep watch.
Behold the menacing arrival of the Supreme Judge.
He is coming, He is coming to end evil, crown the just,
reward the right, set the worried free and grant eternal life.)

As this example of tripartiti dactylici caudati (dactylic hexameter rhyming couplets divided into three) shows, the internal rhymes of leonine verse may be based on tripartition of the line (as opposed to a caesura in the center of the verse) and do not necessarily involve the end of the line at all.

In 1893, the American composer Horatio Parker set the Hora novissima to music in his cantata of the same name.

The epitaph of Count Alan Rufus, dated by Richard Sharpe and others to 1093, is described by André Wilmart as being in Leonine hexameter:

Stella nuit regni: comitis caro marcet Alani:
Anglia turbatur: satraparum flos cineratur:
Iam Brito flos regum, modo marcor in ordine rerum
Praecepto legum, nitet ortus sanguine regum.
Dux viguit summus, rutilans a rege secundus.
Hunc cernens plora: 'requies sibi sit, Deus' ora.
Vixit nobilium: praefulgens stirpe Brittonum.

=== English ===
Leonine rhyme is common in English-language verse.

A Leonine rhyme in Shakespeare's The Tempest 2:2 (1611), sung in a drunken song by Caliban:

No more dams I'll make for fish,

Nor fetch in firing, at requiring,

Nor scrape trenchering, nor wash dish,

'Ban, 'ban, Ca-caliban has a new master. Get a new man.

Leonine verses used by Edward Lear in his humorous poem "The Owl and the Pussy-Cat" (1870):

Pussy said to the Owl, "You elegant fowl!

How charmingly sweet you sing!

O let us be married! too long we have tarried:

But what shall we do for a ring?"

They sailed away, for a year and a day,

to the land where the Bong-Tree grows,

and there in a wood a Piggy-wig stood

with a ring at the end of his nose.
