= Craig M. Wright =

American music historian (born 1944)

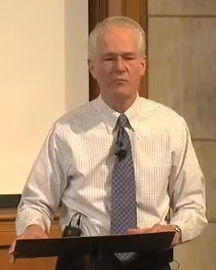
- Wright in 2008
- Born: 1944 (age 81–82)
- Education: Eastman School of Music; Harvard University
- Scientific career
- Workplaces: Yale University
- Thesis: Music at the court of Burgundy, 1364-1419 (1972)
- Website: yalemusic.yale.edu/people/craig-wright

Craig Milton Wright (born 1944) is an American music historian. A Professor of Music Emeritus at Yale University, Wright specializes in early music. He is best known for his work on the Burgundian School, Notre-Dame school and more recently, Wolfgang Amadeus Mozart.

== Life and career ==
Craig Wright studied at the Eastman School of Music from 1962 to 1966, and at Harvard University from 1966 and 1972, where he obtained an M.A. and a Ph.D. in musicology. Wright completed his Ph.D. in 1972 with a thesis titled Music at the Court of Burgundy, 1364-1419. After a year teaching at the University of Kentucky in Lexington, he moved to Yale in 1973, serving as the chair of the department of music from 1986 to 1992. He currently holds the title of the Henry L. and Lucy G. Moses Professor of Music Emeritus at Yale University.

Wright specialises in music history. His early work concentrated on Middle Ages and renaissance music, his most important contribution being Music and Ceremony at Notre Dame of Paris (1989). More recently, Wright turned his attention to Mozart and the study of genius generally, with the publication of his trade book The Hidden Habits of Genius (2020). He received a Guggenheim Fellowship in 1982. In 2004 he was awarded the honorary degree Doctor of Humane Letters from the University of Chicago and in 2010 was elected to the American Academy of Arts and Sciences. In 2016 he was awarded Yale's Sewall Prize for excellence in undergraduate teaching and in 2018 the Yale Phi Beta Kappa Devane Medal for excellence in teaching and scholarship.

On May 15, 2013, Wright was named the first Academic Director of Online Education at Yale University. His Yale online music course Introduction to Classical Music (available on Coursera) had been engaged by 250,000 participants as of August 20, 2024.

== Publications ==
- Music at the Court of Burgundy, 1364-1419: A Documentary History (Institute of Mediaeval Music, Ltd., Henryville, Ottawa, Binningen, 1979), 271 pp.
- Music and Ceremony at Notre Dame of Paris, 500-1550 (Cambridge University Press, 1989), 400 pp.
- Listening to Music (West Publications, St. Paul, 1992), 419 pp; 2nd edition (West Publications, St. Paul, 1996), 435 pp; 3rd edition (Wadsworth, 2000), 451 pp.; 5th edition (Wadsworth, 2007), 451 pp.; 7th edition (Schirmer-Cengage, 2014), 488 pp.; 8th edition (Cengage Learning, 2017).
- The Maze and the Warrior: Symbols in Architecture, Theology and Music (Harvard University Press, Cambridge, Massachusetts, 2001, paperback edition, 2004), 351 pp.
- Music in Western Civilization (Wadsworth-Schirmer, 2006; media edition, 2010), 871 pp.
- The Essential Listening to Music (Schirmer-Cengage, 2013; 2nd edition, 2016), 282 pp.
- The Hidden Habits of Genius (HarperCollins/Dey Street, 2020).
