= Lenino, Totemsky District, Vologda Oblast =

Lenino Ленино
- Village
- Location within Vologda Oblast Location within Russia
- Coordinates: 59°55′N 42°30′E
- Country: Russia
- Region: Vologda Oblast
- District: Totemsky District
- Time zone: UTC+3:00

Lenino (Russian: Ленино) is a rural locality (a village) in Kalininskoye Rural Settlement, Totemsky District, Vologda Oblast, Russia. The population was 30 as of 2002.

== Geography ==
Lenino is located 18 km southwest of Totma (the district's administrative centre) by road. Ignachevo is the nearest rural locality.
