= Hans Tischler =

American musicologist and composer

Hans Tischler (January 18, 1915 in Vienna – November 18, 2010 in Bloomington) was an American musicologist and composer with Austrian origins.

== Career ==
Tischler completed his first PhD in musicology from the University of Vienna with the dissertation titled Die Harmonik in den Werken Gustav Mahlers (1937). The political situation in Europe forced him to leave Vienna, after having been sent to a concentration camp and given a tattoo number (per student Prof. Eric Street, Dayton Univ.) and he immigrated to the United States of America in 1938. His second PhD, with a dissertation titled The Motet in 13th Century France, was awarded by Yale University (1942) and was the first to be granted in the US in Musicology. Tischler then enlisted in the US Army and served from 1943 to 1945 and became a US citizen. From 1945 to 1947, he was appointed head of the music department at West Virginia Wesleyan College. In 1947 he joined the faculty at Roosevelt University in Chicago as associate professor of Music where he taught theory and music history. In 1950, he founded the Chicago Chapter of the International Society of Contemporary Music. Tischler remained at Roosevelt University until 1965 when he was appointed Professor of Musicology at the Indiana University Jacobs School of Music in Bloomington, where he remained until his retirement in 1985.

== Grants, publications and papers ==
Grants from the American Philosophical Society, a Guggenheim fellowship, two National Endowment for the Arts grants, two from the Chapelbrook Foundation, and a grant from the American Council of Learned Societies aided Tischler in his research and publications. He wrote over 150 articles and 22 books, gaining him world-wide recognition in the field of medieval French music, especially of the so-called Notre-Dame school in Paris. He contributed to numerous festschriften, wrote many reviews in learned journals, and gave numerous lectures and papers at conferences and academic institutions all over the world.

== Affiliations ==
Tischler was a member and chapter chair of the American Musicological Society and, in 2009, was honored as a member for more than 50 years. He was also an honorary member of the Austrian Musicological Society. He was a vital member of the Bloomington community, during which time he was a founding member of the Bloomington Chamber Music Society and the Bloomington Jewish Community Beth Shalom.

== Family ==
Tischler married Louise Hochdorf in 1938, and had two children—Judy (1943) and Len (1945). After Louise's death in 1957, he married Alice Bock in 1958. He had two more children with her—Mark (1961) and Laura (1963).

== Legacy ==
In recognition of Tischler's life and work, January 18, 2008, was named Hans Tischler Day in Bloomington by Bloomington Mayor Mark Kruzan.

== Selected publications ==
- The Perceptive Music Listener, Prentice-Hall 1955
- Practical Harmony, Allyn and Bacon 1964
- A Structural Analysis of Mozart's Piano Concertos, Institute of Medieval Music 1966
- A Medieval Motet Book, Assoc. Music Publ. 1973
- The Montpellier Codex, 3 vols. A-R Editions 1978, plus vol. 4: Texts and Translations
- The Earliest Motets (to c.1270): A Complete Comparative Edition, 3 vols. Yale University Press 1982
- Style and Evolution of the Earliest Motets (to ca. 1270), 4 vols. Institute of Medieval Music 1985
- The Parisian Two-Part Organa: The Complete Comparative Edition, 2 vols. Pendragon Press, Stuyvesant, NY, 1988
- Trouvère Lyrics with Melodies: Complete Comparative Edition, 15 vols. American Institute of Musicology, Hänssler-Verlag, Neuhausen 1997
- Conductus and Contrafacta, The Institute of Medieval Music, Ottawa, Canada, 2001
- The Earliest Laude: The Cortona Hymnal, The Institute of Medieval Music, Ottawa, Canada, 2002
- The Earliest Polyphonic Art Music, 2 vols. The Institute of Medieval Music, Ottawa, Canada, 2005
- Trouvère Lyrics with Melodies, Revisited, The Institute of Medieval Music, Ottawa, Canada, 2006
