= Karatobe, Almaty Region =

Karatobe
- Village
- Location in Kazakhstan
- Coordinates: 43°25′40″N 76°44′00″E
- Country: Kazakhstan
- Region: Almaty Region
- Time zone: UTC+6 (Omsk Time)

Karatobe (Kazakh: Қаратөбе, Qaratöbe), formerly Lenino, is a selo in Karasay District of Almaty Region, in south-eastern Kazakhstan.
