= Lenino, Astrakhan Oblast =

Lenino Ленино
- Selo
- Location within Astrakhan Oblast Location within Russia
- Coordinates: 47°00′N 47°19′E
- Country: Russia
- Region: Astrakhan Oblast
- District: Yenotayevsky District

Lenino (Russian: Ленино) is a rural locality (a selo) and the administrative center of Tabun-Aralsky Selsoviet of Yenotayevsky District, Astrakhan Oblast, Russia. The population was 895 as of 2010.

== Geography ==
Lenino is located 42 kilometres (26 mi) southeast of Yenotayevka (the district's administrative centre) by road. Tabun-Aral is the nearest rural locality.
