= Anonymous IV =

Writer of a treatise of medieval music theory

Anonymous IV is the designation given to the writer of an important treatise of medieval music theory. He was probably an English student working at Notre Dame de Paris, most likely in the 1270s or 1280s. Nothing is known about his life. His writings survive in two partial copies from Bury St Edmunds; one from the 13th century, and one from the 14th.

Along with Johannes de Garlandia and Franco of Cologne, whose work precedes his, Anonymous IV's writings are the main source for understanding the Notre Dame school of polyphony. He wrote about Léonin and Pérotin, thereby assigning names to two of the composers of the music of the Notre Dame school who otherwise would have been anonymous. Léonin and Pérotin are among the earliest European composers whose names are known. Although they probably died at least fifty years earlier, he described them as still famous and part of the living tradition.

Anonymous IV mentions Léonin and Pérotin as the best composers of organum and discant respectively. He also mentions specific compositions as being by Pérotin (or Perotinus), including the four-part organa quadrupla Viderunt and Sederunt. Anonymous IV also mentions the work of the theorist Franco of Cologne; describes organum, discantus, rhythmic modes, and genres of composition; and gives rules for the use of notation and of consonance and dissonance.

== Editions and translations ==
The standard edition of the treatise of Anonymous IV is that of Fritz Reckow. Two translations into English have been made. The most recent, still in print, is by Jeremy Yudkin. Although the older translation by Luther Dittmer has long been unavailable, it has recently been released online by the Institute of Medieval Music.
