= Ligature (music) =

Graphic symbol in musical notation

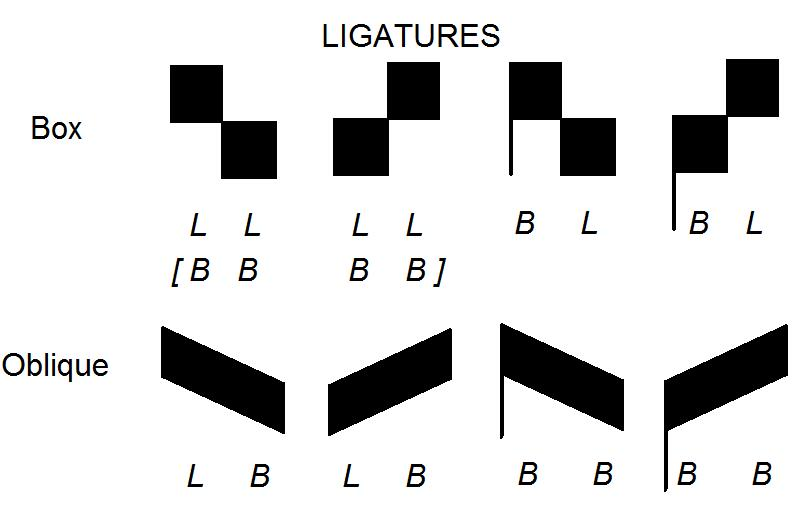
Box and oblique ligatures (13th to 16th century); see usage, below

In music notation, a ligature is a graphic symbol that tells a musician to perform two or more notes in a single gesture, and on a single syllable. It was primarily used from around 800 to 1650 AD. Ligatures are characteristic of neumatic (chant) and mensural notation. The notation and meaning of ligatures has changed significantly throughout Western music history, and their precise interpretation is a continuing subject of debate among musicologists.

== History ==
=== Plainchant ===
The early notation of plainchant, particularly Gregorian chant, used a series of shapes called neumes, which served as reminders of music that was taught by rote rather than as an exact record of which notes to sing. Neumes were in use from the 9th through the 11th centuries AD for most plainsong, and differed by region. Due to their malleable nature, there were no hard and fast rules for the lengths each note was supposed to last, or even how high or low the intervals between notes were to be.

=== De mensurabili musica ===
A treatise on notation named De mensurabili musica was copied around 1260. In this treatise, the anonymous author proposed that, much in the same way that poetry of the time was based on a series of modal rhythms, music should also be set up in this way. The notation of these modes was accomplished primarily through using ligatures in varying lengths and with varying degrees of complexity, where the rhythms would be derived from context. For most of their notated history, this was the purpose of ligatures: to indicate the rhythmic mode.

=== Franco of Cologne ===
Around 1250, a music theorist named Franco of Cologne published a treatise on music entitled Ars cantus mensurabilis. In this treatise, Franco proposed that note values should be set up objectively, so that when looking at the notated music, a musician would be able to tell what notes were being sung or played, and the duration of those notes, with some degree of certainty. Ligatures were used for this as well, as they had become more or less standardized through the practice of the rhythmic modes.

=== Polyphonic music from c1300-c1600 ===
See mensural notation (ligatures).

== Usage ==
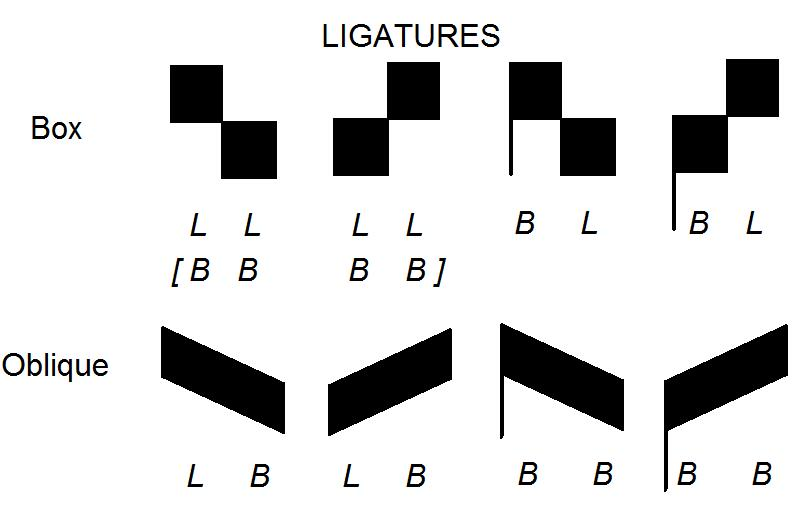
Ligature values vary based on the shape of the ligature and whether it has a tail.

Ligatures have two basic shapes: box (rectangular) and oblique (angled). Additionally, some ligatures have tails that either point up or down; the direction of the ligature's tail affects its meaning, unlike the direction of a tail on a modern note head. While primarily contextual, the system of ligatures in use from the 13th to the 16th century is fairly standardized. All ligatures of this period have the following principles in common:

- All ligature notes are either the length of a longa ("L"), a breve ("B"), or a semibreve ("S").
- All ligatures have at least two notes.
- For ease of discussion, ligatures of different lengths have different names. A ligature with two notes is called a binaria; one with three notes, a ternaria; one with four notes, a quaternaria; and one with five notes, a quinaria. Larger ones are possible, but rare.
- If a ligature has three or more notes, all notes in the middle (the mediae) are B.
- A downward tail changes the value of the note where the tail occurs, either from L to B or, less commonly, from B to L.
- An upward tail indicates that the next two notes are a series of S.
- A tail at the end of a ligature indicates an additional note be sung or played, called a plica, that is not part of the ligature. Plicas were especially common with the rhythmic modes, to accommodate in practice what could not be accomplished within the very strict theoretical basis for modal music.

=== Alternate interpretations ===
Most scholarship on ligatures is focused on period from the 13th to the 16th centuries. Prior to this period, ligatures were far less standardized; a quaternaria ligature that, under the above rules, would mean a series like SSLB would simply mean BBBB.

== Transcription ==
In transcribing old works to modern notation, where no compound graphs as ligatures exist, editors usually indicate by a hook, a bracket (brace), or (less often in polyphonic music) a slur/phrase mark those notes that the original combined into a ligature. To avoid confusion, many scores transcribed purely for performance do not include additional notation to indicate that a particular note originally belonged to a ligature, as most methods to show this have separate meanings in a performance capacity.

== See also ==
- Legato
