= Organum =

Type of plainchant melody

Organum (Note: Latin: "an implement, instrument, engine of any kind", of musical instruments, "a pipe", of hydraulic engines, "an organ, water-organ"; "an implement, instrument"; "a musical instrument" from Greek: ὄργανον, [organon] "instrument, implement, tool, for making or doing a thing" "organ of sense or apprehension", "musical instrument", "surgical instrument", "work or product", "instrument of philosophy" "instrument or table of calculations" .) (/ˈɔːrɡənəm/) is, in general, a plainchant melody with at least one added voice to enhance the harmony, developed in the Middle Ages. Depending on the mode and form of the chant, a supporting bass line (or bourdon) may be sung on the same text, the melody may be followed in parallel motion (parallel organum), or a combination of both of these techniques may be employed. As no real independent second voice exists, this is a form of heterophony. In its earliest stages, organum involved two musical voices: a Gregorian chant melody, and the same melody transposed by a consonant interval, usually a perfect fifth or fourth. In these cases the composition often began and ended on a unison, the added voice keeping to the initial tone until the first part has reached a fifth or fourth, from where both voices proceeded in parallel harmony, with the reverse process at the end. Organum was originally improvised; while one singer performed a notated melody (the vox principalis), another singer—singing "by ear"—provided the unnotated second melody (the vox organalis). Over time, composers began to write added parts that were not just simple transpositions, thus creating true polyphony.

== History ==
=== Early organum ===
The first document to describe organum specifically, and give rules for its performance, was the Musica enchiriadis (c. 895). The oldest methods of teaching organum can be found in the Scolica and the Bamberg Dialogues, along with the Musica enchiriadis. The societies that have developed polyphony usually have several types of it found in their culture. In its original conception, organum was never intended as polyphony in the modern sense; the added voice was intended as a reinforcement or harmonic enhancement of the plainchant at occasions of High Feasts of importance to further the splendour of the liturgy. The analogue evolution of sacred architecture and music is evident: during previous centuries monophonic Mass was celebrated in abbatial churches; in the course of the 12th and 13th centuries the newly consecrated cathedrals resounded with ever more complex forms of polyphony. Exactly what developments took place where and when in the evolution of polyphony is not always clear, though some landmarks remain visible in the treatises. As in these instances, it is hard to evaluate the relative importance of treatises, whether they describe the 'actual' practice or a deviation of it. As key-concept behind the creative outburst that manifested in the 11th and 12th centuries is the vertical and harmonic expansion of dimension, as the strongly resonant harmony of organum magnified the splendour of the celebration and heightened its solemnity.

The earliest European sources of information concerning organum regard it as a well-known practice. Organum is also known to have been performed in several different rites, but the main wells of information concerning its history come from Gregorian chant. Considering that the trained singers had imbibed an oral tradition that was several centuries old, singing a small part of the chant repertory in straightforward heterophony of parallel harmony or other ways of "singing by the ear" would come naturally. It is made clear in the Musica enchiriadis that octave doubling (magadization) was acceptable, since such doubling was inevitable when men and boys sang together. The 9th-century treatise Scolica enchiriadis treats the subject in greater detail. For parallel singing, the original chant would be the upper voice, vox principalis; the vox organalis was at a parallel perfect interval below, usually a fourth. Thus the melody would be heard as the principal voice, the vox organalis as an accompaniment or harmonic reinforcement. This kind of organum is sometimes called parallel organum, although terms such as sinfonia or diaphonia were used in early treatises.

The history of organum would not be complete without two of its greatest innovators, Léonin and Pérotin. These two men were "the first international composers of polyphonic music". The innovations of Léonin and Pérotin mark the development of the rhythmic modes. These innovations are grounded in the forms of Gregorian chant, and adhere to the theoretical rhythmic systems of St. Augustine. It is the composers' love for cantus firmus that caused the notation of the tenor line to stay the same, even when the methods of penning music were changing. It was the use of modal rhythm, however, that would make these two men great. Modal rhythm is defined clearly as a succession of (usually) unequal notes arranged in a definite pattern. The Notre-Dame composers' development of musical rhythm allowed music to be free from its ties to text. While it is well known that Léonin composed a great deal of organum, it was the innovations of Pérotin, who spent much of his time revising the organum purum of Léonin, that caused generations of organum and motet composers to exploit the principles of the rhythmic modes.

==== Notre-Dame school ====
Quid tu vides (organum by Pérotin)

Cultural and intellectual life flourished in Paris during the 12th century with the University of the Sorbonne having become a reputed institution that attracted many students, not all of them French. The construction of Notre-Dame Cathedral on the Île de la Cité took place between 1163 and 1238 and this period coincides with the various phases of development of the Paris style of organum. The Cathedral of Notre-Dame and the University of Paris served as the center of musical composition and as a transmitter of musical theory in the 12th and 13th centuries. The presence of Léonin and Pérotin at the Notre-Dame School made Paris the centre of the musical world in the 12th century. Léonin, magister cantus of Notre-Dame, compiled the Magnus Liber Organi de Gradali et Antiphonario. Léonin wrote organa dupla based on existing chants like the Alleluia and the gradual of the mass and responsory and Benedicamus Domino of Vespers for the major liturgical ceremonies in the yearly cycle. In hindsight, this turned out to be a major event, as this was the first large-scale project attributable to a single composer. Not only is it a compilation for practical use during mass and office compassing the ecclesiastic year, the first of its kind; it also introduces the use of the rhythmic modes as a creative principle. Thus, when in a discussion of organum of the Paris School the word "modal" or "mode" is used, it refers to the rhythmic modes and specifically not to the musical modes that rule over melody.

In Léonin's Organa de Gradali et Antiphonario two forms of organum technique are evident: organum purum and discantus. Benedicamus Domino is a good example of the principles used. "Benedicamus" is usually mixed syllabic—neumatic in that it has mostly one note or maybe two per syllable of text, which is set in florid organum over a sustained tenor. "Domino" is in its Gregorian form set in melismatic style with three or more notes to a syllable and here both tenor and duplum proceed in discantus set in the six rhythmic modes, to be finalized with a florid cadence over a sustained tenor. Thus, in larger texts, depending on how the words were set to music, syllabic parts (having no ligatures and therefore non-modal) end up as organum purum: the tenor sustains each single note of the chant over which the organal voice drapes a new florid line, written mostly in ligatures and compound neumes. Starting from a consonant, mostly the octave, sometimes lead in by 7–8 over 1, the duplum line explores the harmonious interplay with the tenor, building up to a change of harmony at the end of a melisma where another syllable is produced at a different pitch. Where the Gregorian chant is no longer syllabic but uses ligatures and melismas, both voices proceed in a rhythmic mode. This section of discantus is concluded, on the last syllable of a word or phrase, by a copula, in which the tenor sustains either the penultimate or the last tone and the duplum switches back to a florid cadence, to conclude on a consonance. Thus, in organum duplum of Léonin these compositional idioms alternate throughout the complete polyphonic setting, which is concluded in monophonic chant for the last phrase. Thus, three different styles in the organaliter section are alternated and linked according to the text, leaving the last part of the text to be sung choraliter in monophonic chant. The verse of the chant is worked out according to the same principles.

The relevant contemporary authors who write about the organum of the Notre-Dame school, Anonymous IV, Johannes de Garlandia, the St. Emmeram Anonymous and Franco of Cologne, to name a few, are not always as clear as could be desired. Nevertheless, much information can be distilled from the comparative research of their writings. Organum purum is one of three styles of organum, which is used in section where the chant is syllabic thus where the tenor can not be modal. As soon as the chant uses ligatures, the tenor becomes modal and it will have become discant, which is the second form. The third form is copula (Lat. coming together) which in the words of Johannes de Garlandia "is between organum and discant". and according to Waite a bridge section between modal and non-modal sections. It seems that for most instances we can take Garlandia literally where he says 'between' organum and discant. In organa dupla, the copula is very similar to a short, cadential organum purum section but in organa tripla or conducti it is seen that irregular notation is used. Either the last notes of ligatures are affixed with a plica which divides the notes in smaller values, or a series of disjunct rests is used in jolting succession in both parts, creating what is also called hocket. These features also can be frequently found in two-part discantus on special cadences or a preparation of a cadence, where they are also referred to as "copulae". Garlandia states simply: "a copula is where are any number of lines are found". referring to the plicae or rest-signs. Thus organum duplum on a texted chant as a gradual, responsory or the verse of an Alleluia can be schematized as follows:

- beginning of text set to organum: organaliter:
- organum purum >> copula >>
- discantus >> copula >>
- organum purum >> copula >>
- discantus >> copula >>
- closing lines of text choraliter

In the Notre-Dame repertory the Alleluia itself is only composed organaliter in the opening section, before the Jubilus, the protracted vocalization of the last syllable, which is to be sung choraliter, and as such is absent from all extant original manuscripts. The above stated general principles have been used freely, as in Alleluia V. Dies sanctificatus, where "dies" starts off with a little melisma which is judiciously set as a large non-modal florid section over all the notes of the tenor on "di(-es)", reserving discantus for "nò(-bis)" instead of having a short section in discantus right away at the beginning.

Pérotin "is the best composer of discantus", according to Anonymous IV, an English student, writing ca.1275, who has provided at least a few morsels of factual information on Paris Organum and its composers. Pérotin further developed discantus in three part Organum (Organum Triplum) where both organal voices are in discantus. Note that organum purum is not possible in three-part organa, all three parts are modal and need to be organized according to the rhythmic modes.

Pérotin even went as far as composing two four-part organa (quadrupla), "Viderunt omnes" and "Sederunt principes" which were performed in Notre-Dame in 1198 on New Year's Day and in 1199 on the feast of St Stephen (a decree of Odon de Sully, Bishop of Paris, exists which stipulates the performance of 'organa tripla vel quadrupla') Apart from organa, Pérotin extended the form of the Aquitanian versus which was henceforth called conductus. Any conductus is a new composition on new texts and is always composed in the rhythmic modes. Perotin set several texts by Philippe le Chancelier, while some texts refer to contemporary events. Two-part conductus form the larger part, though conductus exist for one to four voices. Three and four part conductus are, by necessity, composed throughout in discantus style. As in organa tripla, handling three voices (or four) precludes the kind of rhythmic freedom found in dupla. In conductus the distinction is made between 'cum littera' and 'sine litera', texted sections and melismatic sections. The texted parts can sometimes go beyond the modal measure and then fall back into regular mode in the melismatic section. Again according to Anonymous IV, Pérotin wrote a number of replacement clausulae from organa dupla by Léonin.

As the tenor in organa dupla in discant sections proceeds always in the 5th mode (all longs in a rhythmic group ordine), Pérotin, who was a generation removed from Léonin, saw fit to improve them by introducing different modes for the tenor and new melodic lines for the dupla, increasing the rhythmic organization and diversity of the section. However, in the largest compilation of Notre-Dame repertoires (F) no less than 462 clausulae exist, many recurrences of the same clausulae (Domino, et gaudebit in variant settings, according to. 'written in a variety of styles and with varying competence' A further innovation was the motellus, to be found in W2, in which the upper part of a discant section is supplied with a new text, so that when the tenor utters a single syllable of chant, the upper part will pronounce several syllables or words. As such it reminds of the prosulae that were composed, replacing a long melisma in a chant with new, additional words. This would have been the first instance of two different texts being sung in harmony. In turn, the motellus gave birth to the motet which is a poly-textual piece in discant, which obviously sparked a lot a creativity as it soon became a prolific form of composition.

The organa that were created in Paris were disseminated throughout Europe. The three main sources are W1, St. Andrews, Wolfenbüttel 677, olim Helmstedt 628; the large and illuminated copy made in Florence, owned by Piero de Medici, the Pluteo 29.1 of the Bibliotheca Mediceo-Laurenziana (F), which is by far the most extensive copy of the repertory. Finally W2, Wolfenbüttel 1206, olim Helmstedt 1099, which was compiled the latest (and contains the greatest number of motets).

There are arguments that support a relative freedom of rhythm in organa dupla but others who say that the interpretation of the music should always be according to modal or Franconian principles. Willi Apel and William G. Waite insisted upon a rigorously modal interpretation. Though Waite in his dissertation, notably in chapter 4: The notation of organum duplum' acknowledged that in organum duplum and monophonic conducts relative freedom may have been taken, he transcribed a selection of the Magnus Liber Organi of Léonin into strict modal rhythm. Apel argued that the long values for dissonances (in violation of the basic principle of consonance) produced by modal rhythms in Notre-Dame organa, can be reconciled by a statement made by several medieval theorists that "the tenor pauses, if a dissonance appears". Debates on interpretation are ongoing. However, Waite was working in the 1950s, and his point of view has been supplanted by newer research: "...but [Waite's] view that the entire corpus [of the Magnus Liber Organi] should be transcribed according to the rhythmic modes is no longer accepted" (Peter Jeffery in the Notation Course Medieval Music 1100–1450, Princeton).

In the range of forms of compositions found in the later two manuscripts that contain the Notre-Dame repertory (F and W2) one class of distinction can be made: that which is (strictly) modal and that which is not. Organum duplum in its organum purum sections of syllabic setting, the cum littera sections in two-part conductus, copulae in general and monophonic conductus would be that part of the repertory which is not strictly modal. In monophonic song, be it chant or a conductus simplex by Perotin, there is no need to vary from the classical standards for declamation that were a rooted tradition at the time, going back to St. Augustine's De Musica. It has been firmly established by extensive research in chant traditions (Gregorian Semiology) that there is a fluency and variability in the rhythm of declamatory speech that should also govern chant performance. These principles extend to the not strictly modal sections or compositions, as a contrasting quality with musica mensurabilis.

As Parisian Organum is rooted in Gregorian chant tradition, it is categorized under Ars antiqua which is thus called in contrast to the Ars nova which embarked on new forms that were in every sense original and no longer based on Gregorian chant and as such constituted a break with the musical practice of the ancients.

== See also ==
- Medieval music
- Saint Martial school

== Sources ==
- Apel, Willi. 1949. "From St. Martial to Notre Dame". Journal of the American Musicological Society 2, no. 3 (Autumn): 145–58.
- Fuller, Sarah. 1990. "Early Polyphony". In The New Oxford History of Music 2: The Early Middle Ages to 1300, revised edition, edited by Richard Crocker and David Hiley, 485–556. Oxford and New York: Oxford University Press, 1990. ISBN 9780193163294
- Johannes de Garlandia. 1972. De mensurabili musica, edited by Erich Reimer, 2 vols. Supplement to the Archiv für Musikwissenschaft 10–11. Wiesbaden: Franz Steiner Verlag.
- Lewis, Charlton, T. 1890. "Organum". An Elementary Latin Dictionary. New York, Cincinnati, and Chicago. American Book Company. Online access at Perseus Digital Library, Tufts University, Gregory R. Crane, editor-in-chief (Accessed 26 December 2013).
- Lewis, Charlton T., and Charles Short. 1879. "Organum" Freund's Latin Dictionary, revised, enlarged, and in great part rewritten by. Charlton T. Lewis, Ph.D. and., LL.D. Oxford. Clarendon Press. 1879. Online access at Perseus Digital Library, Tufts University, Gregory R. Crane, editor-in-chief (Accessed 26 December 2013).
- Liddell, Henry George, and Robert Scott. 1940. "ὄργανον, τό, (ἔργον, ἔρδω)". A Greek-English Lexicon, revised and augmented throughout by Sir Henry Stuart Jones, with the assistance of Roderick McKenzie. Oxford: Clarendon Press. Online access at Perseus Digital Library, Tufts University, Gregory R. Crane, editor-in-chief (Accessed 26 December 2013).
- William G. Waite. The Rhythm of Twelfth Century Polyphony. New Haven: Yale University Press, 1954. Second edition 1976. Apart from a selective transcription of the organa dupla by Leonin, this dissertation contains many quotations from the contemporary theorists preceding the transcription. Of particular interest is 'The Notation of Organum Duplum, p. 106–27, from which quotes are taken.
