= Notre-Dame school =

School of High Middle Age composers associated with Notre-Dame cathedral, Paris

The Notre-Dame school or the Notre-Dame school of polyphony refers to the group of composers working at or near the Notre-Dame Cathedral in Paris from about 1160 to 1250, along with the music they produced.

Breves dies hominis
Breves dies hominis, Notre-Dame school.

The only composers whose names have come down to us from this time are Léonin and Pérotin. Both were mentioned by an anonymous English student, known as Anonymous IV, who was either working or studying at Notre-Dame later in the 13th century. In addition to naming the two composers as "the best composers of organum," and specifying that they compiled the big book of organum known as the Magnus Liber Organi, he provides a few tantalizing bits of information on the music and the principles involved in its composition. Pérotin is the first composer of organum quadruplum—four-voice polyphony—at least the first composer whose music has survived, since complete survivals of notated music from this time are scarce.

Léonin, Pérotin and the other anonymous composers whose music has survived are representatives of the era of European music history known as the ars antiqua. The motet was first developed during this period out of the clausula, which is one of the most frequently encountered types of composition in the Magnus Liber Organi.

While music with notation has survived, in substantial quantity, the interpretation of this music, especially with regard to rhythm, remains controversial. Three music theorists describe the contemporary practice: Johannes de Garlandia, Franco of Cologne, and Anonymous IV. However, they were all writing more than two generations after the music was written, and may have been imposing their current practice, which was quickly evolving, on music which was conceived differently. In much music of the Notre-Dame School the lowest voices sing long note values while the upper voice or voices sing highly ornamented lines, which often use repeating patterns of long and short notes known as the "rhythmic modes". This marked the beginning of notation capable of showing relative durations of notes within and between parts.

== Notre-Dame motets ==
Bevilacqua notes that "While it is known that Parisian organum and related genres were being cultivated in the last quarter of the twelfth century, no manuscript collection dating before the 1230s has yet been discovered. The surviving Notre-Dame sources do not predate the decade 1230–40 at the earliest". The earliest known motets are the Notre-Dame motets, written by composers such as Leonin and Perotin during the 13th century. These motets were polyphonic, with a different text in each voice, and employed the rhythmic modes. An example of a Notre-Dame motet is Salve, salus hominum/O radians stella/nostrum by Perotin, composed between 1180 and 1238. Nunes-Le Page and her colleagues note, however, that "there are many uncertainties about the actual date of the first compositions of polyphonies. However, it is very likely that if Bishop Odo de Sully proclaimed the use of polyphonies for the most significant liturgical observances in the decrees of 1198 and 1199, these polyphonies existed prior to those decrees.

== Contemporary accounts ==
With polyphony, musicians were able to achieve musical feats perceived by many as beautiful, and by others, distasteful. John of Salisbury (1120–1180), philosopher and Bishop of Chartres, who taught at the University of Paris during the years of Léonin but before Pérotin, was one of the latter. He attended many services at the Notre-Dame Choir School. In his Policraticus he offers a first-hand description of what was happening to music in the High Middle Ages, writing:

Bad taste has, however, degraded even religious worship, bringing into the presence of God, into the recesses of the sanctuary a kind of luxurious and lascivious singing, full of ostentation, which with female modulation astonishes and enervates the souls of the hearers. When you hear the soft harmonies of the various singers, some taking high and others low parts, some singing in advance, some following in the rear, others with pauses and interludes, you would think yourself listening to a concert of sirens rather than men, and wonder at the powers of voices … whatever is most tuneful among birds, could not equal. Such is the facility of running up and down the scale; so wonderful the shortening or multiplying of notes, the repetition of the phrases, or their emphatic utterance: the treble and shrill notes are so mingled with tenor and bass, that the ears lost their power of judging. When this goes to excess it is more fitted to excite lust than devotion; but if it is kept in the limits of moderation, it drives away care from the soul and the solicitudes of life, confers joy and peace and exultation in God, and transports the soul to the society of angels.
