= Saint Martial school =

Medieval school of music composition

The Saint Martial School was a medieval school of music composition centered in the Abbey of Saint Martial, Limoges, France. Most active from the end of the ninth century until first half of the thirteenth century, some scholars prefer to describe its practices, music, and manuscripts and their countless innovations as 'Aquitanian'. It is known for the composition of tropes, sequences, and later versus compositions dealing with all forms of poetic and musical experiments (including polyphonic forms of discant and even troped organum). In this respect, it was an important precursor to the Notre Dame School. Adémar de Chabannes and his uncle Roger de Chabannes, who introduced Adémar in the craftship of a notating cantor, were important proponents of this school whose hands had only been recently identified and discovered by studies of James Grier between 1995 and 2005. Although they did neither invent a local variant of a vertically precise organisation of notation nor a new form of local tonary, they did reorganise existing chant manuscripts of the diocese Limoges, and they improved the libellum structure of a new type of sequentiary troper whose organisation was still young at their time, but played a key role for the Saint Martial school, the school of Winchester (e.g. GB-Ccc Ms. 473) following Wulfstan and the later Parisian Notre Dame school.

== History of the Abbey Saint Martial de Limoges ==
Many of the early musicological studies concerning a "Saint Martial school" had their focus on four manuscripts with remarkably innovative compositions dating back to the late eleventh and twelfth centuries, and this focus was mainly about polyphony. It was often assumed that these fragments derived from different Southern French monasteries, which were collected at the library of the Abbey. After its destruction, the manuscripts were collected and saved by the French king. According to their older collocations at the Bibliothèque nationale they were part of a large collection called "Saint-Martial". Due to the lack of cantor attributions in the rubrics, the many layers and hands who contributed to it, and many other codicological characteristics of the huge collection pointing at different destinations, the name of a "Saint Martial school" became soon a matter of discussion.

Sarah Fuller discussing the "myth of a Saint Martial school" argued that the fragments are rather a collective activity of the Abbey's librarians than a didactic activity of the Abbey's cantors and thus, questioned the term of a local school based at Limoges. These manuscripts (F-Pn lat. 1139, 3549, 3719, and GB-Lbl Add MS 36881) were, it would seem, more likely collected and bound together by the librarian Bernard Itier (StM B & C) who obviously shared not the obsessions of modern musicologists concerning twelfth-century polyphony, and later librarians at Saint Martial Abbey. Nevertheless, Bernard Itier was known as a precentor which means he was an educated cantor who could notate and was skilled in improvising as well as composing organa. Thus, Fuller's separation did not make any sense, and as a librarian he knew the treasures of his library, as well as Adémar de Chabannes' as other precious troper sequentiaries which he had bound, because he cared for them.

F-Pn lat. 1139 is the most important of these four manuscripts, called Saint-Martial A, B, C and D (StM A-D), and consists of 235 folios. The earliest part of "Saint-Martial A" reaches from folio 32 to 118, has one dry point guide-line with diastematic Aquitanian point notation or partly agogic neumes (a clear sign that many notatores contributed to the troper) and this compilation can be dated back to the end of the eleventh century (1096-1099). It has two parts:

- After litanies and the lament of Rachel a so-called versarium (a huge versus collection which replaced the troper with tropes for proper mass chant), Benedicamus domino versus, a florid organum over a lesson, liturgical dramas, and polyphonic settings of Benedicamus domino sometimes with a tropus of an organal voice (ff.32r-62r).
- A notated lectionary with so-called epistles (ff.63r-73v), a prosulae collection as part of a sequentiary (ff. 80-107), and a troper fragment (as continuation of the versus collection or versarium) about ordinary mass chant (Sanctus, Kyrie tropes, and three about Agnus Dei) (ff. 73v-77v; 108v-117v) (ff.63r-118r).

The later parts are a local proser of Limoges dating to the twelfth century (ff. 149r-228v) in Aquitanian point notation, and a collection of Marian hyms made as tropes of the antiphonary in square notation on red staff dating to the thirteenth century (ff. 119r-146v). This compilation was bound in 1245 and the main focus of musicological studies has been always the versarium (a collection of versus which had become a fancy genre replacing older collections of tropes and sequentiae). The oldest part was rich of poetic and musical experiments already done during the eleventh century, and since Limoges was obviously not its centre, "Aquitanian polyphony" became an alternative name to a so-called "Saint Martial school".

Despite of the concordances between these manuscripts, the collection includes many variants of a few compositions which would point precisely at the existence of such a school. The repertory combines innovative forms of poetry with innovative forms of musical composition, consisting of settings of proses. The troper (poetic and melodic additions of proper and ordinary mass chant except tropes of the alleluia verse) was a separated book or libellus, while the Marian versus became a new genre of the later eleventh century which obviously replaced here the proper mass chant troper. The proper tropes are in fact completely missing in this manuscript. Despite of its name, sequentiary in Aquitaine referred less to a collection of sequentiae than to a collection of the untroped responsoria of the alleluia verses whose sections were marked by a round letter almost looking like the Greek minuscule δ (as it can be seen in the sequentiary of ms. 1118). The short psalm verses or non-scriptural verses had been left out, the incipits of the sequentiae such as «Cantemus organa» were written at the margin in red ink to identify the responsoria. The prosulae, non-scriptural tropes of the one or two short psalm verses between the repeated alleluia responsoria, were sometimes referred to the separated book (libellus) called "sequentiary". Thus, the proser (in this case a collection of sequentiae), the prosulae and the sequentiary were one complex in Aquitaine, and its contents were interconnected. Concerning Ms. 1139 there is only a prosulae collection, but some alleluia verses had been written on the last pages of the eleventh-century part, but were left without any neumes. The libellum versarium of the manuscript had three versus composed in Occitan language (ff.44r;48r-50r) and various cyclic compositions needed for liturgical drama (ff.52v-58r), and organa (ff.59v-61v, here used as general term for all forms of polyphony to embellish liturgical chant on the occasion of higher feasts). Even a polyphonic setting of liber sapientiae (Iesu filii Sirach 24:11-20) reading as florid organum (ff.44v-45v).

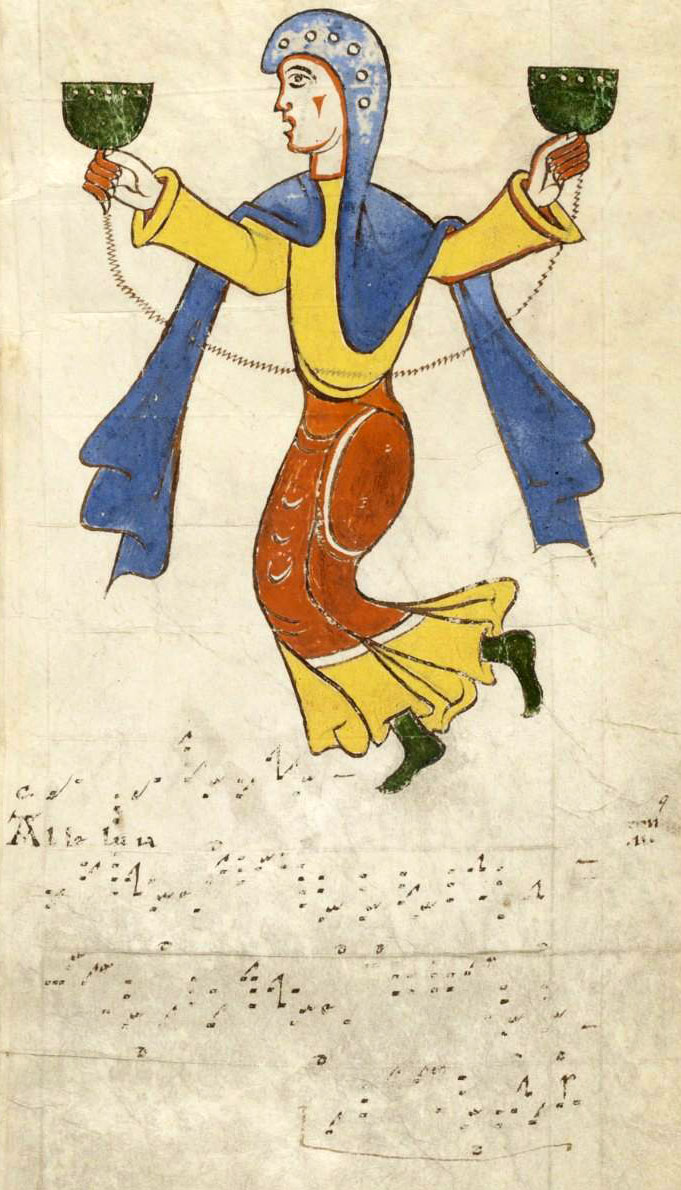
Sequence composed by the Plagi proti intonation. Sequentiary from Aquitaine, end 10th century (F-Pn lat. 1118, fol. 114r)

The first 30 folios with parts from the thirteenth and twelfth centuries have conductus dedicated to Saint Martial, but were bound together in Paris under its first collocation "Regius 4458".

The exceptional character of elaborating liturgical chant either poetically or musically (and polyphony was just a few of many forms), often both at the same time, explains the confusion of musicologists studying these four manuscripts. Where they expected a systematic collection going through the calendar, they found instead loose collections with exceptional compositions of all kinds. Thus, it was rather normal that later additions were made for a few occasions (sometimes different realisations made over the same cantus), and they had to be added, where space was left. Some of these manuscripts are collections with unusual parts (like a lectionary rubrified as epistolary, «epistolarium», but it sometimes compiled extracts from the Old Testament and even changed them), but in their individual way composed (despite of many later additions which naturally confuse such a composition). Musicologists started with the most odd collections, calling their parts a troper (in fact, a versus collection called versarium), a sequentiary (prosulae collection) and a proser (mostly sequences, some additional tropes to the antiphonary). Others are just loose fascicles of a few folios and far too short to establish any order.

The confusion here is that they were bound together with a liturgical text-book of quite a different nature. Thus, even the later suggestion to call all four manuscripts "versaria" just prove one thing: that musicologists until the present day have problems to classify them—just for the way they are composed. But despite of all this confusion, the four manuscripts can be thanks to their datation and thanks to different strategies of using different types of notation studied as the continuous work in progress of a local school. The earliest layer which can be dated back to the eleventh century, has a prosulae collection and these recent compositions became in the other manuscripts dating to the twelfth century increasingly material to compose long pieces of polyphony.

Other musicological studies have attempted to identify a unifying centre for these sources (especially the eleventh-century part of StM A), such as Cluny rather than Limoges, and with reference to the Cluniac Monastic Association, Fleury and Paris (especially the Notre-Dame School, the Abbey of Saint Denis, and the Abbey Saint-Maur-des-Fossés). Questions about periphery and centre may be answered by the research of political and church history relative to Cluny.

In contrast to Fuller's study, James Grier's recent examination of earlier monophonic Proser-Sequentiaries suggests that they were created at the scriptorium of the Abbey Saint-Martial 100 years earlier (than the fore-mentioned fragments including polyphonic compositions), explicitly for liturgical use at Limoges, by Roger and Adémar de Chabannes. The concept of a local school of cantors who documented their innovations in newly designed liturgical books with the libellum structure which means divided into book-parts called «libelli»—later imitated elsewhere (even in the Parisian Magnus liber organi)—is therefore still credible; at least for the late tenth and eleventh centuries.

Their main activities were manuscripts with colourful illuminations (the visual aspect that the more or less fragmentary sources of Aquitanian polyphony do not have), not the invention of notation and tropes, but their systematic improvement, the redaction of liturgical music manuscripts of whole Aquitaine and the transformation of the local chant repertoire by a musical art of memory based on the libellus tonary. The local manuscripts showed already a rich collection of tropes for the proper and ordinary mass chant. Roger and Adémar reworked and improved it thus keeping the Aquitanian school alive (right at Limoges, Saint Martial had not yet the rang of an Abbey).

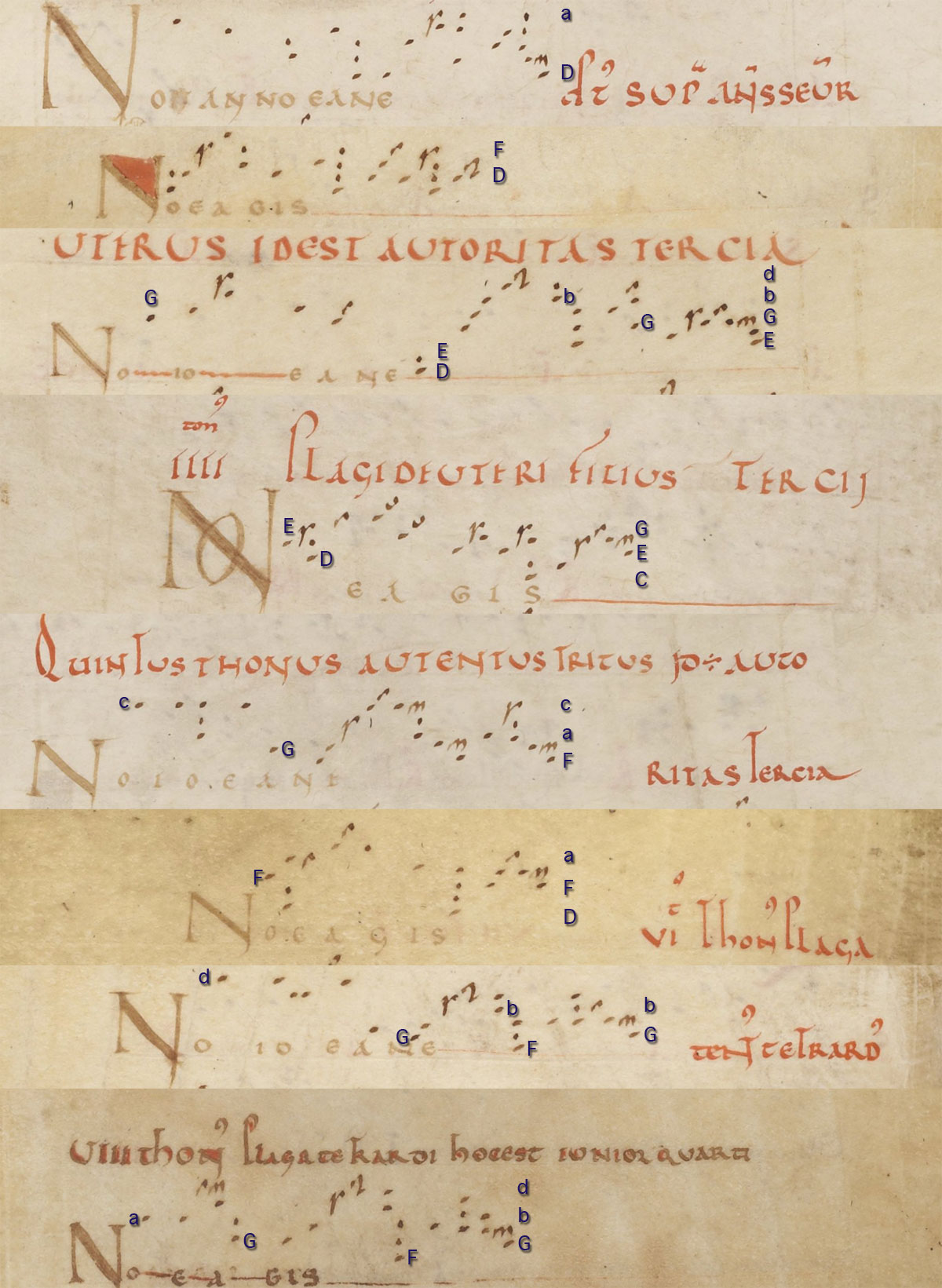
The intonation formulas for the 8 tones according to the Aquitanian tonary, which was partly notated by Adémar

=== Roger and Adémar de Chabannes and the troper-sequentiary ===
Adémar de Chabannes was educated as a cantor and poet by his uncle Roger de Chabannes. The manuscripts written or revised by Roger de Chabannes together with his nephew, were created in the form of troper-prosers and sequentiaries with a new diastematic form of neume notation (F-Pn lat. 1240, 1120, 1121, 909) which became soon much more popular than the letter notation of William of Volpiano. They belonged to a new type of chant book which was no longer simply a liturgical book, but rather collected new poetry based on liturgical forms (in music as well as in poetry). This new form of chant book consisted of several small books ("libelli") - the "proser" (collection of sequences), the troper (additions to the proper mass chant in calendaric order and tropes to identify melodies of ordinary mass chant like kyriale, Gloria tropes etc.), the sequentiary (untroped responsoria of alleluia verses), the processional with processional antiphons, the offertorial for offertories etc. and the tonary (for classifying the church tone and the related psalmody to mass and office chant). This new structural form soon spread beyond Aquitaine becoming popular in France and Normandy, due in part to the Cluniac Monastic Order, which was expanding its influence and adopted the work of the school of cantors at the Abbey of Saint-Martial for liturgical use. Cluny Abbey was founded by William I and already in Adémar's time its laic association had gained its power over more and more abbeys, their cantors and their scriptoriums. Adémar's fruitless efforts to become an abbot at Saint Cybard of Angoulême was a personal disappointment, but his ambitions were quite symptomatic for monasteries under Cluniac influence.

According to James Grier, Adémar de Chabannes also contributed within two troper sequentiaries (F-Pn lat. 1121, 909) which have the finest tonaries of the region. He regards this late activity as a craftship which he learnt from his uncle, while he was revising older manuscripts, often by adding modal signatures to earlier manuscripts. Following Fuller's argumentation Limoges was a unifying centre, not created by "librarians", but by ambitious cantors and at the heart of their métier, the musical memory inseparable from the liturgical texts, is the tonary. The intonation formulas of the tonaries had as well an explicit creative function, which can be demonstrated by an earlier manuscript already written in diastematic neumes. Some composed sequences of this earlier troper proser sequentiaries (F-Pn lat. 1118, fol. 114r) are nothing else than a simple repetition of a more and more elaborated intonation, but the verse units cut the melodic motive into different parts, often against its modal structure. These early permutation technique already anticipated later isorhythmic composition techniques.

=== Early polyphony and the Cluniac influence on liturgical reforms ===
The scriptorium of Limoges continued its activities after Adémar's death in 1034, but it was no longer the only scriptorium of the Limousin diocese. William Sherrill made the hypothesis, that the Gradual of St Yrieix with Gallican preces in its appendix (F-Pn lat. 903) has not been written at Limoges, but by the cantors of the Abbey itself which was possible since it promoted as canon chapter during the second half of the 11th century and depended directly of the Monastery of St Martin at Tours. He even went so far to assume that this gradual has copied from Beneventan graduals, because the included Cassinese chants for the patronal feast of St Benedict, and might have served to copy for the gradual of Gaillac, while the latter could have served to write the later gradual for Toulouse. In this comparison the liturgy of the Saint-Martial Gradual (F-Pn lat. 1132) is rather dependent on Cluniac reforms and especially the one of Narbonne, written by the end of the 11th century for the use at the cathedral, resembles to many others written with the same notation in Spain after the conquest of Northern Andalusia, when Aquitanian aristocrats had been related with the Castilian families by marriage. And it marks a turn, because large parts of the huge local collection of tropes and sequences have just disappeared in the Gradual, likewise Adémar's compositions of mass chant and its tropes to celebrate the patron Saint Martial as an apostle (see the entry Adémar de Chabannes). The reason was not that Adémar's plan to raise the local saint to the rang of an apostle did not work out, it did, although after his death. Scribes following in Adémar's footsteps preserved the local collection and the local form of Troper Sequentiary as can be seen in a manuscript written after his death (F-Pn lat. 1119). But Cluny as a reform centre abandoned the sequences and tropes. The versus became a new important and innovative genre which is well reflected in the local fragments of Aquitanian polyphony, after the local heritage of tropes and sequences by Adémar and cantors before him had been skipped in the later manuscripts.

Polyphony was neither invented at Limoges nor did it appear the first time in the notation of its scriptorium. An oral tradition of a polyphonic performance can be traced back to the time, when the Musica enchiriadis had been written. Adémar was a contemporary of Guido of Arezzo who described in his treatise Micrologus a similar practice as "diaphonia" (discant) which already allowed to sing more than one note against the cantus during cadences ("occursus"). Notated evidence of alternative practices, where the organal voice changes between different strategies of heterophony (parallel and counter movement) and holding notes which support the modal colour of the cantus, can be found as later added exemplification in monophonic manuscripts of the Abbeys in Saint-Maur-des-Fossés, Fleury, and Chartres. One example concerning the tradition of Fleury Abbey is an addition of an organal voice (similar to the organum notation of the Winchester Troper) in a hagiographic Lectionary (V-CVbav Cod. Reg. lat. 586, fol. 87v) for three Mass graduals «Viderunt omnes» (Christmas), «Omnes de Saba» (Epiphany), and «Gloriosus deus» (Fabianus and Sebastianus). The local style of the cantors were counter movement and holding notes with the syntactic structure underlined by occursus endings. The only exception was Winchester Cathedral, where a systematic collection of organa can be found in the troper part—the so-called "Winchester Troper". The earliest polyphony developed in a rather secular context and Cluny played a prominent role in it.

What was exactly the role of the Abbey of Saint Martial for a school of anonymous cantors associated with Aquitanian polyphony?

The earliest evidence can be found in an older Troper-Proser with libellum structure (F-Pn lat. 1120). In some late additions cantors made exemplifications of a polyphonic performance of organum similar to those additions in the Gradual of the Abbey of Saint-Maur-des-Fossés (F-Pn lat. 12584, f.306r). Under Cluniac influence the latter abbey developed an extravagant liturgy since 1006, when it was ruled by a new Abbot, who was sent from Cluny, where he had served as a cantor. The polyphony can be easily recognized, because the notator used a method similar to a modern score.

There had been other methods as well. Some later additions in the early Troper-Proser (F-Pn lat. 1120) on folio 73v and on 77v look monophonic on the first sight, but the melody is organized in pairs so that each verse of it has to be sung together with an organum voice. The organum voice simply sings the text of the first verse with the melody notated with the text of the second one, and the cantus does vice versa repeat the melody of the first verse, while the singers applies it to the text of the second verse. On folio 81r and 105r we have three early examples of later added florid organum.

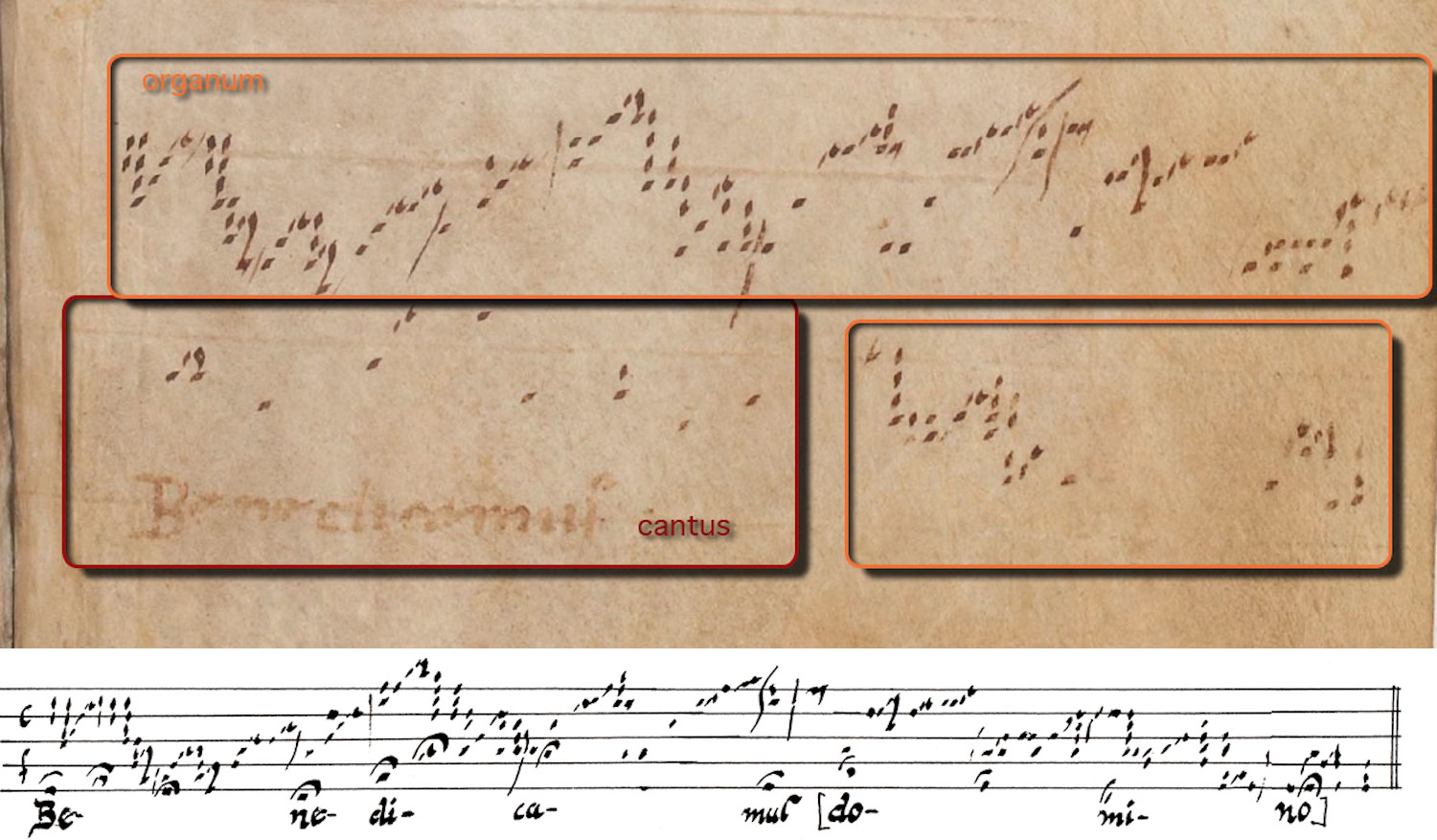
Earliest example of florid organum over "Benedicamus domino" added by a later hand to the Troper Proser Processional of the Abbey Saint Martial about 1100 (F-Pn lat. 1120, f.105r)

Its notation technique had already developed in the monophonic manuscripts notated in parts by Adémar, in cases where the scribe of the text did not leave enough space for the neumes. The notator already used vertical strokes, which do indicate how the melismas have been coordinated with the syllables. On folio 105 recto, a «Benedicamus domino» was notated separately from the florid organum.

Both techniques of polyphonic performance, the punctum contra punctum (discant) and florid organum as puncta contra punctum have been once discussed in a fifteenth-century treatise from Italy, which had been obviously associated with the treatise "Ad organum faciendum" of Aquitanian provenance.

=== The manuscripts of "Aquitanian polyphony" ===
In comparison with the few late traces of a polyphonic singing in the earlier manuscripts, the four main manuscripts, recently also called "versaria" which would automatically suggest to call the libellum (volume) with the versus collection "versarium", and a lot of similar manuscripts of Aquitaine are so full of later developments, that their manifold forms, the calligraphy, the illuminations, and the poetry have not lost their attraction for philologists and musicians. Recent research though has rather focussed on the long prehistory of such an amazing development which is the tonary in itself and a new way to compose and decorate liturgical books since the tenth century. Further on, an early focus on tropus and sequentia (poetic innovations within monodic forms of plainchant) and in a second step this abundant culture of liturgical poetry flourishing from the tonary (according to current knowledge not invented by Adémar, since it was well developed in his days) faced its dramatic reduction through Cluny. Forced by the liturgical reform with Cluny as its center, a new genre versus exploded to give a new way to the vital creative energy. New experiments with lessons and Marian versus compositions went in all possible directions (monodic elaboration of new poetic texts, florid organum, discantus, the integration of local languages beyond, but related to medieval Latin). All four manuscripts of so-called Aquitanian polyphony are more or less unstructured collections (as such appendices) of Marian versus or conductus, and some examples of liturgical drama, only a smaller part of it were polyphonic by the end of the eleventh century.

The manuscripts "Saint-Martial B" und "D" even were nothing more than additional quaternia within a homiletic collection of sermons. Most of the manuscripts with polyphonic compositions are not just from the Abbey of Saint-Martial at Limoges, but as well from other places of Aquitaine. It is unknown to what extent these manuscripts reflect the products of Saint Martial in particular, it rather seems that there were proser collections from various places in Southern France and Catalunya, and as such they must be understood from the context of the Reconquista of Spain and certain Southern French dynasties who became involved in it, often more by marriage than by wars.

==== Troped organum «Stirps iesse» ====
A well-known example is «Stirps iesse» (StM A, ff.60v-61r; StM B, ff.166v-167r) which is nothing else than a florid organum over a Benedicamus domino cantus which was widespread within the Cluniac Monastic Association including the Magnus liber organi of the Notre Dame school, but the innovative and unique technique (which was not repeated at the Notre Dame school, cantors there just used the composition of the responsorium Stirps iesse as a whole to run two organal voices over the same tenor) was that a tropus was composed over the organal voice. As the Benedicamus domino concluded almost every divine service, Cluniac cantors were supposed to know a great variety of them. Many of them had been new compositions and became favoured subjects for new experiments in poetry and musical composition. Florid organum itself like any tropus can be regarded in two ways, as a useful exercise to memorize a certain cantus precisely note by note on the one hand or, as a very refined and embellished performance by a well-skilled soloist or precentor. «Stirps iesse» as a musical and poetic versus composition was actually a combination of both, as a Benedicamus domino performed «cum organo» it was rather a longer performance during an important liturgical feast, but the troped organal voice added a certain Marian poem to it which fixed it within the week between Christmas and New Year.

The Benedicamus domino versus «Stirps iesse» was inspired by a tenth-century composition attributed to Fulbert de Chartres which are the verses of a melismatic responsorium prolixum which he likely composed to establish the feast of Mary's Nativity on 8 September relating her to the tree of Jesse. His composition paraphrased passages of the Vulgate translation (Iesaiah 11:1-2):

R Stirps Iesse virgam produxit virgaque florem
et super hunc florem requiescit spiritus almus.
Alleluia.

V Virgo Dei genetrix virga est flos filius eius.
Alleluia.

— Responsorium (Nativity of Virgin Mary)
Translation:

R The root of Isaiah grew a branch and the branch a flower,
and above the flower reposes the cherishing spirit.
Alleluia.

V Virgin, birthgiver to God, your branch has the flower of His son.
Alleluia.

The melody of the Benedicamus domino is simply taken from the chant of this responsorium over the words «flos filius eius» (F-Pn lat. 12044, f.175r, second half of the second line). The Notre Dame school also has an organum triplum composed over the soloist parts of this responsorium (manuscript F, ff.26v-28r).

Also the poet troping the organal voice paraphrases these words like a given subject, and his composition of a Benedicamus domino versus elaborates the first stanza by adding others:

Stirps iesse florigeram
germinauit* virgulam
et in flore spiritus
quiescit paraclitus

Fructum profert uirgula
per quem uiuunt secula

Stirpis ex dauidice
uirga dicta mistice
que sic et° sic floruit
et que florem protulit

Virga iesse uirgo est
dei mater flos
filius eius est

Cuius pater huic flori
preter morem edito
canunt chori×
sanctorum ex debito

Laus laus~ et iubilatio
potestas cum imperio
sicine∞ termino
celorum domino

Tenor: «Benedicamus domino»

— Versus «Stirps iesse florigeram»
Translation:

The root of Isaiah flourished
germinating a nucleus
and in the flower
reposes a comforting spirit.

A fruit bears the little branch
for which centuries will live:

The tribe of David
a nucleus nourished mysteriously,
and out of it flourishes
and thus, a flower comes out.

The branch of Isaiah is a virgin,
the mother of God,
and the flower is His son

Whose father thus, from a flower
beyond death is founded,
that the choirs
of saints have to sing.

Praise and jubilation,
a power that its reign
is without end through
centuries, to the Lord.

Tenor: "We laud the Lord!"

Variants in StM B
* ierminavit 
° sicque 
× cori
~ second «laus» omitted
∞ sit sine

In Saint-Martial A, the notator only wrote the neumes for the organum part. The cantus which was notated in neumes above on the same folio with another trope to memorize each note of the melisma («benigno uoto qui» etc.), was notated by letters in round minuscule script. Many notes are missing like the "bc" which is supposed to follow the plagal "a" (the deepest note of the tune) about «spiritus quiescit paraclitus». It is crucial to understand that the tune of «flos filius eius» is slightly different from the more common version known from Paris, and also used at Saint-Martial B. The second syllable Benedicamus has BCD instead of CD, the melisma over domino starts DDEDCD instead of DFDCD. A negligence concerning the cantus of the notator is more than evident, in particular its syllables «dicamus» where the syllable «di» with the note d obviously belongs to the verse «per quem vivunt», and after «Cuius pater» is the bizarre syllable «ho» which belongs to the d written above and refers to the long melisma over the first syllable of «domino» in the cantus. The melisma starts with vers «Stirpis ex davitice» and like at the beginning the d was not written (very likely it was anticipated at the end of the preceding line), while a minuscule d could be meant by the left curl of the decorated majuscule S at the beginning of the organal voice. The repetition of «laus» in the last part is nothing else than a written out ornament that became later known as «principium ante principium» at the Notre Dame school (the tenor enters at the end of the ornament on the lower octave). After the cadence at «Fructum profert uirgula» the dry point guide-line has a clef change which was not indicated by the notator. Until the cadence it was F fa, afterwards it becomes a re.

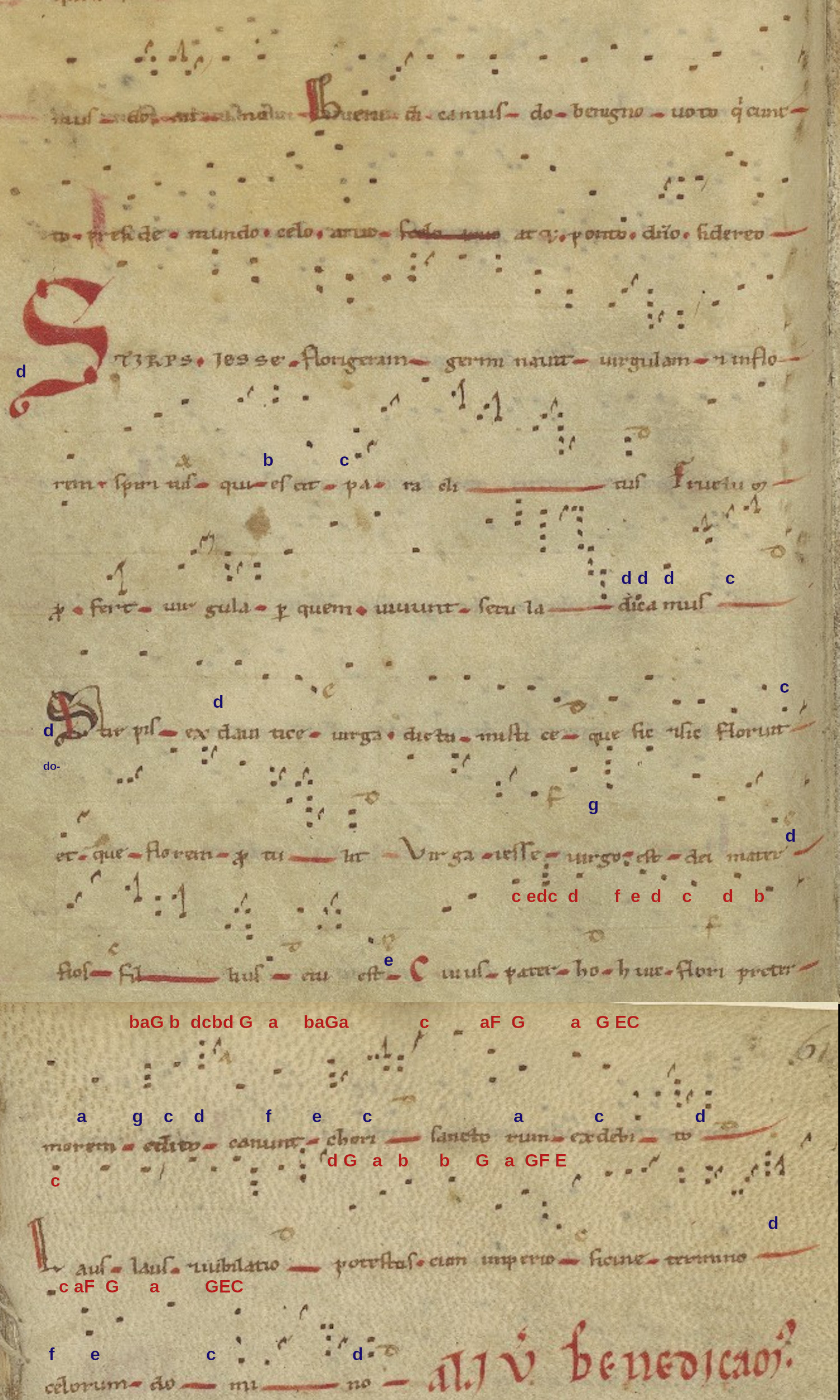
Troped Benedicamus domino (tenor) and troped organum «Stirps iesse» (florid organum) of the manuscript Saint-Martial A (F-Pn lat. 1139, ff.60v-61r)

Even if this reconstruction can be only approximately, the cantus should stick to the version as given by the scribe right before the organal voice. Like in the early florid organum example (F-Pn lat. 1120, f.105r), there are changes indicated by the organum singer like in case of an ornament like «principium ante principium» and others rather related to the ornament «paenultima», when the step of the cantus singer forces the organum to conclude on a concordant interval like unison or octave, or on a "discordant concordance" like fourth and fifth. Concerning Pythagorean tuning thirds and sixths must be intonated as rough dissonances, they are not meant as harmonic intervals. Unlike the ars organi by Léonin at Notre Dame de Paris, the early florid organum in Aquitaine did not avoid perfect intervals like unison or octave within a musical phrase.

In Saint-Martial B, the notator wrote the tenor in Aquitanian point notation with red ink, the dashes are encircled and the syllables of the tenor are written slightly below or aside. The cantus written in red ink follows the Parisian redaction known from the manuscripts of Saint Maur-des-Fossés, just the beginning delays the change to the second syllable «Be-ne-» DAC D and the beginning of the melisma over «domino» was assimilated to DEDCD, obviously caused by the negligence of the notator of the earlier version who used a local variant of the Flos filius eius tropus as cantus. Thus, the whole composition of the organum is already different, also formulas of the organum singer used during the changes caused by the cantus are different (the organum singer documented in Saint-Martial A preferred the upper tonus as an occursus, as Guido of Arezzo called it in his treatise Micrologus, proceeding to the unison which was used as a conclusive cadence). The organum singer documented in Saint-Martial B preferred the lower tonus during an occursus. It is visible that the later cantor of the twelfth century whose realisation was written down, used different formulas.

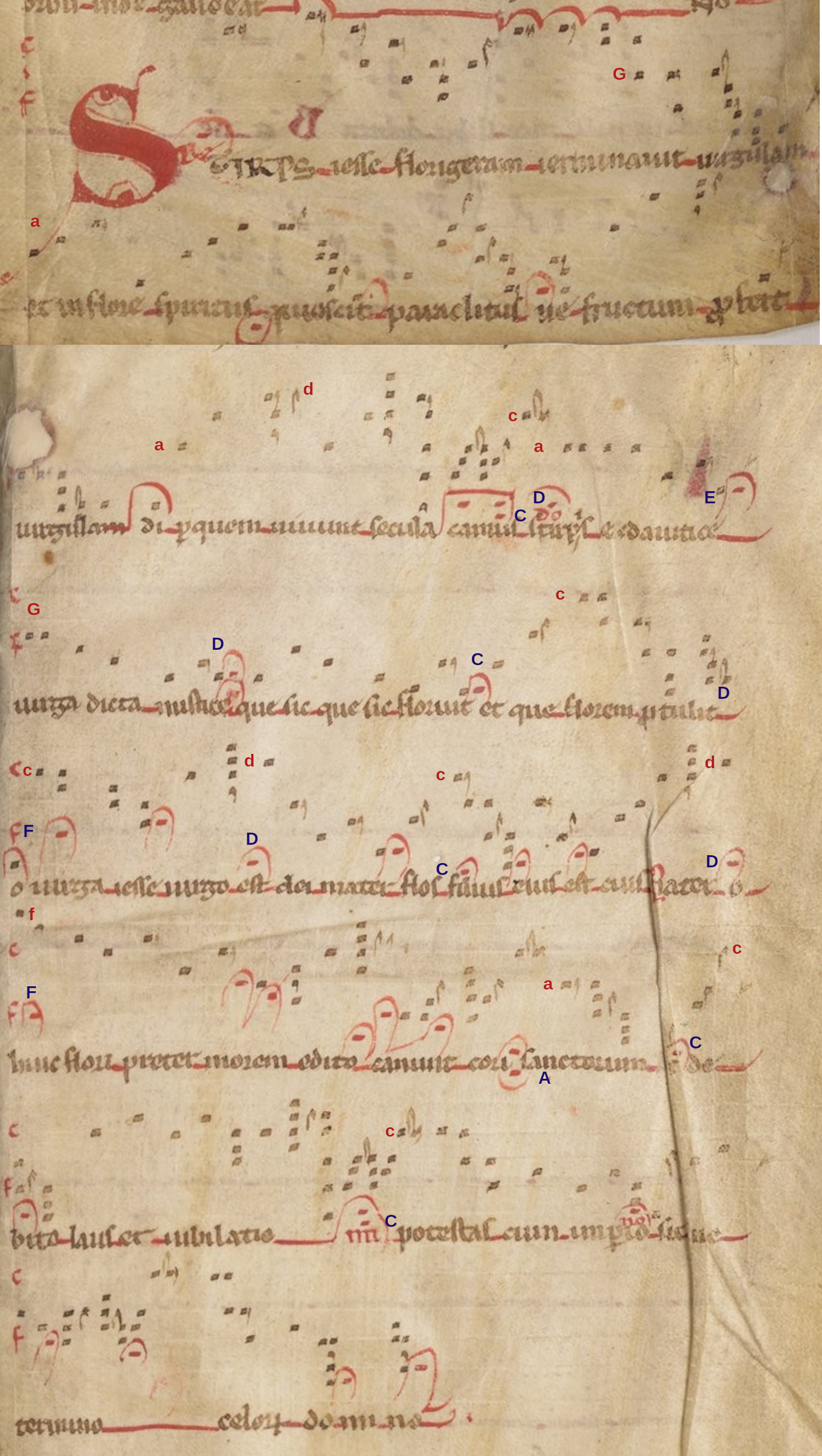
Troped organum «Stirps iesse» of the manuscript Saint-Martial B with the tenor written in red ink (F-Pn lat. 3549, ff.166v-167r)

This later version tried to reach a more concise organisation, while the earlier version is more unique. The long falling line at «secula» used ornaments at the conclusion of a phrase which became later a typical ornament at the Notre Dame school, seems to have a predecessor at the Aquitanian organum singer who was documented in StM A and used it in a rather genuine way to express the time expansion. It caused a different local reception. The later cantor documented in StM B abbreviated the long chain of falling notes by trichords and simply understood its architectonic function within the piece. The Benedicamus domino over «flos filius eius» opens at the end of the first word from a modal point of view by making a cadence on C within the Plagius protus melos. The identical situation is by changing to the final syllable of «domino» where the listener expects a final conclusion on D, but the melody repeats the phrase DFECD. Thus, DC on the syllables «mus» (organum «vivunt secula») and «mi» (organum «laus et iubilatio») have to open the form to prolong it, in a way it is the situation to betray the expectation of the audience. The organum is so prepared that the composition avoids a concordant concordance D by creating one on C instead. The two-part composition of these analogue passages is absolutely identical and the repetition of the aesthetic game (the singers of the recording made in 1983 did misread the manuscript, because they erroneously postponed the cadence on C of the organal voice to the beginning of the next section «stirpis ex davitice») creates a rational moment of artistic composition within an originally improvised form of florid organum which is still present in the earlier version documented in Saint-Martial A. This kind of parallelism can be also found in several other places, for instance a concordant cadence on the octave on D which appears thrice, although over different steps to D at the tenor at «virgo est», «Cuius pater» and «morem edita».

==== Improvising and troping a florid organum ====
Some readers might think, after they had studied both realisations of the troped organum «Stirps iesse» using the famous Benedicamus domino over the plagius protus tune known as «Flos filius eius» that it was done with great perfection, but how can a young cantor who is eager learn to improvise such a florid organum, be step by step instructed to do such a florid organum and then, on a second step, composing a tropus over the organal voice?

Such a workshop does indeed exist in the manuscript Saint-Martial C (ff.70r-v). It is not resulting in a sophisticated poem like «Stirps iesse florigeram», but it just teaches the very basics.

For instance, an organum-singer is not forced to start an octave higher, but in early sources also a kind of ornament like «principium ante principium» can be found leading to an unison with the cantus:

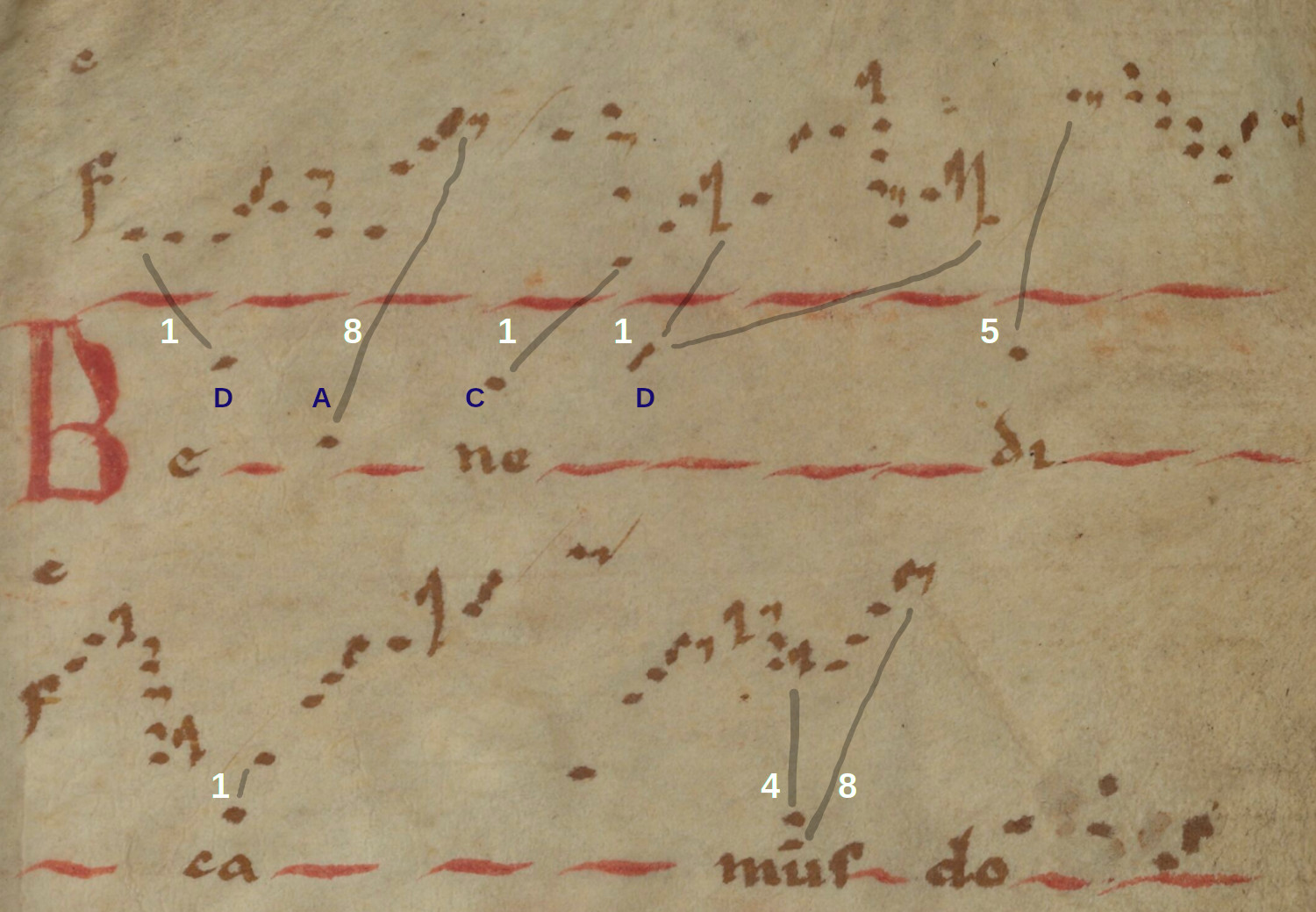
Organum workshop in the manuscript Saint-Martial C (F-Pn lat. 3719, f.70r), improvised florid organum over the «flos filius eius» tune

But then over «dicamus» the organum-singer starts a new form section on the octave. Such an incision is also done opening another florid organum section during the long melisma over the first syllable of «domino». It is not absolutely necessary, but here it is just used to show, how it does work to construct over a given cantus and how to divide it into sections.

After the conclusion on an octave on C, the melisma of the cantus requires a discant section to get faster through the notes of the cantus. But this time not very fast, but just the beginning of this melisma as written down by the end of the second line after the organum. The text is just fill words which get their assonances by the flexion as past participles like «merito ex debito» or the combination of flected verbs with ablative endings of nouns and adjectives «confio gaudio unico mistico misterio nato dei jam filio». Although the notator did not explain, when organum and cantus come together, concerning an easy progression like D E D C D can be simply deduced by the gravitation of the organum's melos:

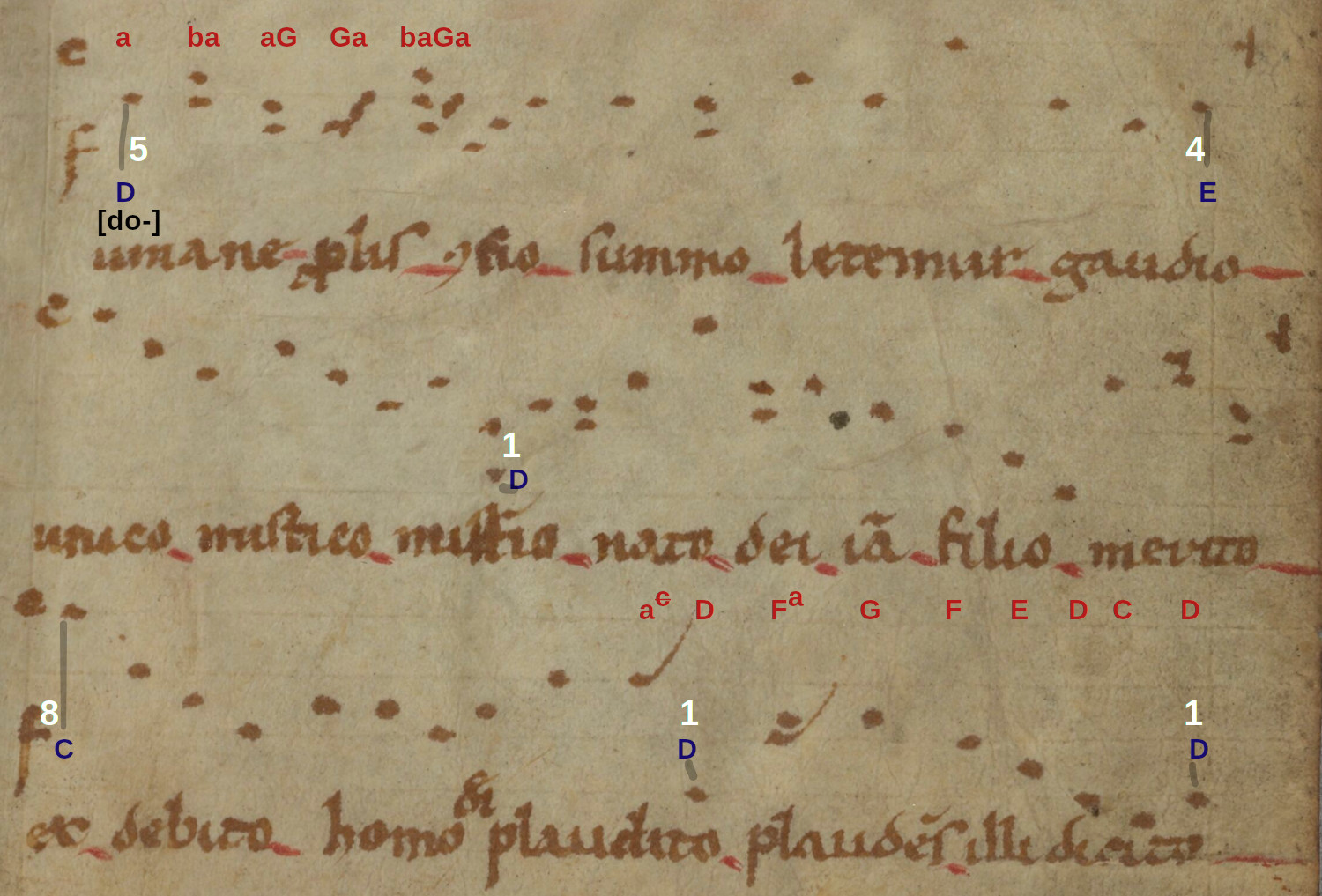
Organum workshop in the manuscript Saint-Martial C (F-Pn lat. 3719, f.70r) and how a tropus creates a rhythmic discant (approximative reconstruction)

The result of the troped text is in fact that it will not be rushed, but the rhythm follows the metric feet (pedes) of the words or verses and automatically creates a structure like the rhythmic modes of the Notre Dame school which tried to imitate metric feet like iambus, trochaeus or hexameter. The rhythmic structure did not depend on the modal organisation of square notation, it was born very naturally by the process of troping since the earliest tropes of the ninth century. Thus, the birth of rhythmic discant was tropus just like it worked with the strophic poetry of sequentiae. Here right in the focus is the change between the pneumatic setting of the text (with two or three notes over a syllable) like at the beginning «umane prolis», at «misterio nato» or at «merito» and the syllabic setting, where the prosody of the language creates the accent and the rhythm.

The following organum section uses again just another eight notes of the melisma which lead again to the finalis D re. The analytical way, how the notes of the cantus or better: tenor are notated is very interesting, because the groups in the melisma are still visible.

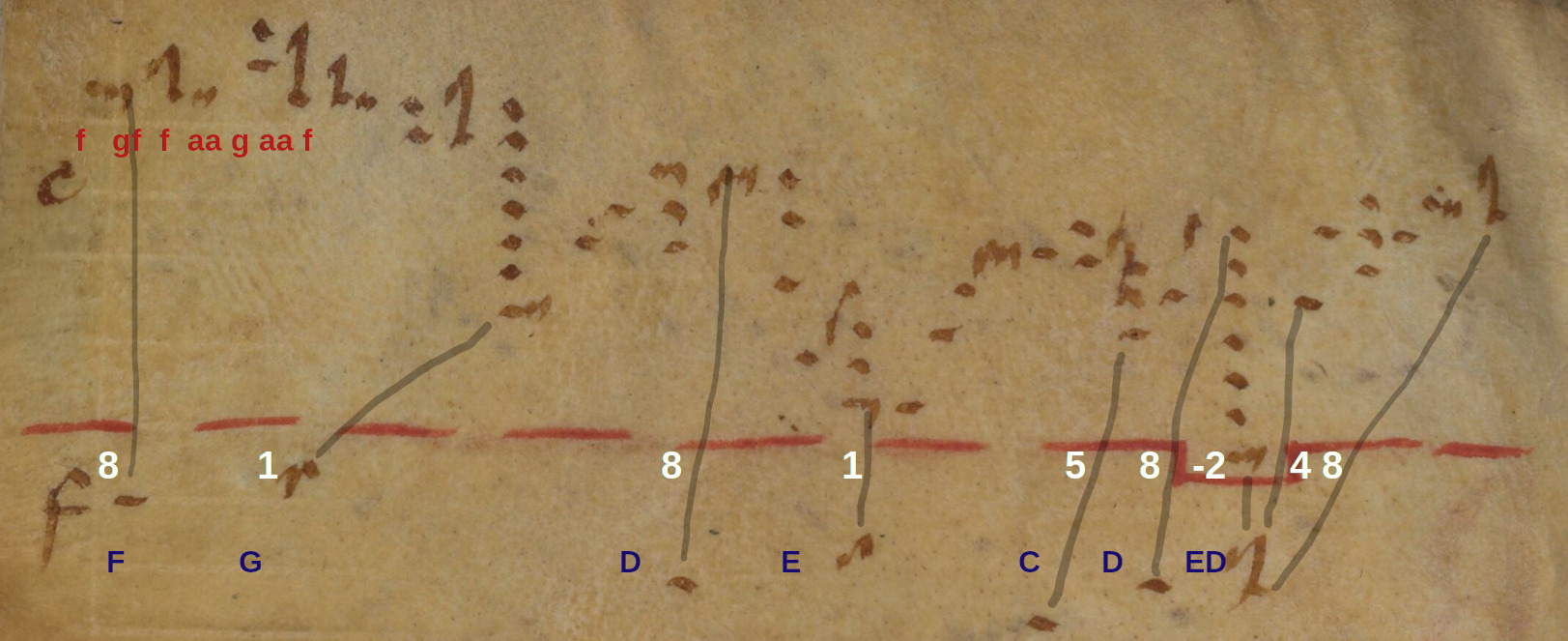
Organum workshop in the manuscript Saint-Martial C (F-Pn lat. 3719, f.70v) with the second organum section

The organum could as well start an the octave (diapason) over the finalis, but the repetition of D was used up for the last discant section. Thus, the organum here opens on an octave over F fa and moves up to the highest note of bisdiapason aa (doubled in Guidonian letter notation).

Also in the last troped discant section, the notator did not reveal the coordination of both verses, but he used certain motives like bGF in the first half, and DFECD in the second half which is the concluding melody of the cantus over the last syllable of «domino». This time the cantus has to progress almost punctum contra punctum with the organal voice and can also cross over it:

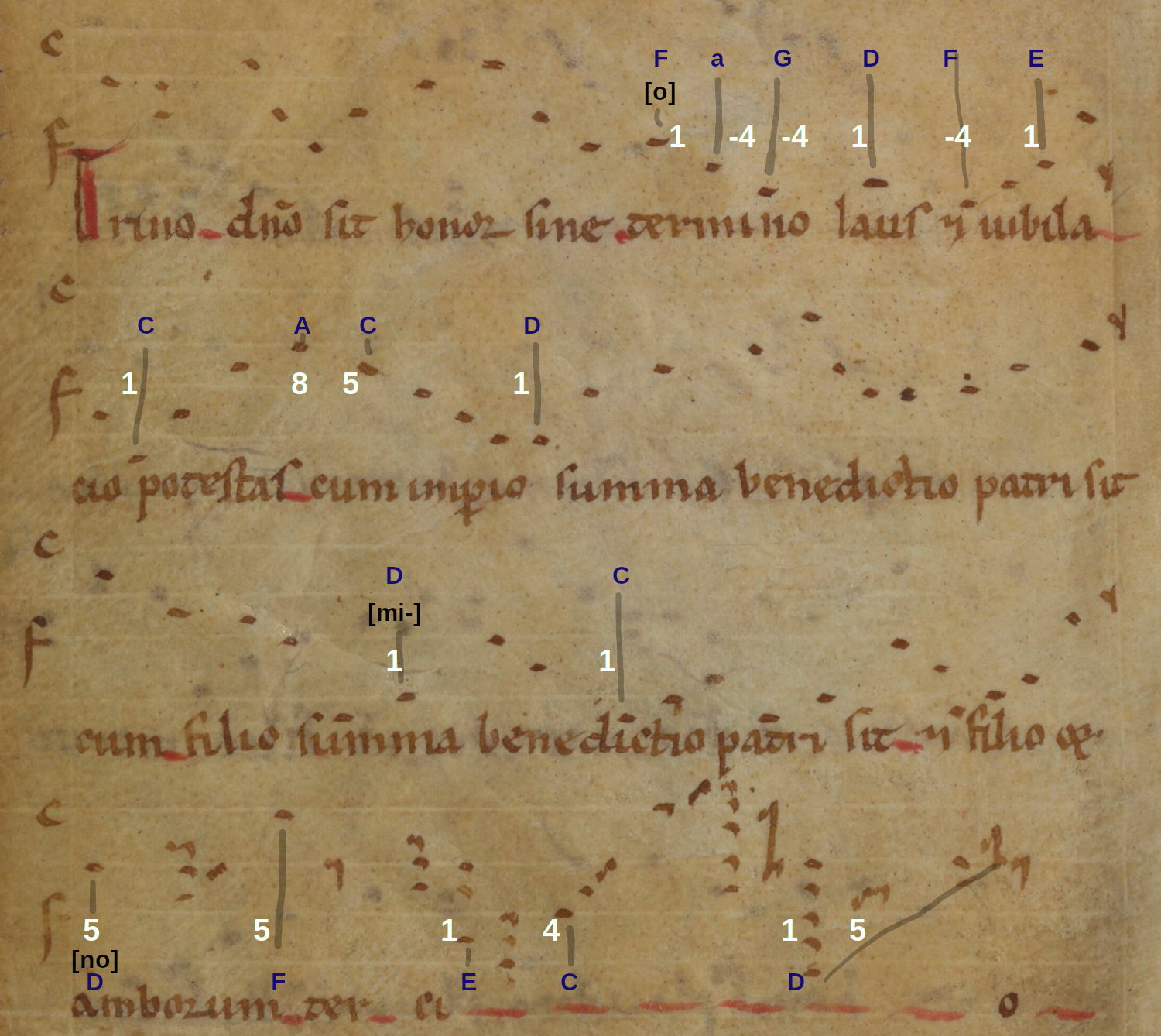
Organum workshop in the manuscript Saint-Martial C (F-Pn lat. 3719, f.70v) the concluding troped discant section with copula (approximative reconstruction)

This way this didactic example teaches three ways of polyphonic setting, the free-rhythmic florid organum, the rhythmic troped sections, where the tenor changes by the end of the verse, and the regularly pneumatic progression where the organal voice moves according to the rhythm of the text and final free-rhythmic sections with currentes running through the octave to the paenultima of the tenor as final conclusion. Like in the Sponsus composition «Senescente mundano filio» analysed below, the composition does not end on the unison, but after a final cadence on the unison the organal voice moves again up to the upper fifth or pentachord over the finalis (D—a). Unlike the Notre Dame school this conclusion was obviously perceived as a final conclusion.

==== Two examples of hidden polyphony ====
Especially the oldest part of Saint Martial A only revealed the polyphonic compositions on a second careful examination and sometimes confirmed by later manuscripts, where the notators notated them visibly for a modern reader as polyphony. Thus, the list of five polyphonic compositions of Saint-Martial A's troper grew to thirteen which is a small number concerning a manuscript 190 folios (not counting the first part which was later added to it). Three of this obvious polyphonic compositions, written in score as two staffed lines and usually separated by a horizontal stroke in red ink, had been added somewhere by later hands usually at some blank pages left at the end of a fascicle. Very likely it was this "modern way" of notating polyphony almost like a modern score (not so precisely adjusted vertically) for which Saint-Martial A became so popular among musicologists, because there are only few medieval sources which can be dated earlier like the gradual antiphonary of the Abbey Saint-Maur-des-Fossés (F-Pn lat. 12584, f.306r), where the parts have been notated vertically even while using adiastematic central French neumes. The more common way was to notate the organal voice separately on the same page (later additions like in F-Pn lat. 1120) in another part of the book (Winchester Troper) or even added in different books, sometimes not even with musical notation (Fleury). The hidden way of notating polyphony, on the other hand, had also a lot of advantages, they clearly indicated a swapping of both parts continuing with the verse notated with the organal voice (something that Sarah Fuller in her review of Judith Marshall did not even consider), that there was no longer any cantus, but just the principal voice as the one which had been used to compose the organal voice over it as a second step. But there was no longer any hierarchy between them like the traditional chant and an added voice to sing it with organum.

The most evident example is the simple versus composition «Virgine nato», because the scribe notated the first two stanzas almost like a modern two-part partition by notating the first voice with the first stanza right over the second voice with the second stanza, each concluded by a melismatic verse ad repetendum «Gaudeat orbis» which connects the four stanzas like an Andalusian chordal poem:

Virgine nato
rege beato
Gaudeat orbis

Hoste fugato
sed medicato
Gaudeat orbis

Lux dominatur
nox separatur
Gaudeat orbis

Vita paratur
mors superatur
Gaudeat orbis

— Christmas versus (F-Pn lat. 1139, f.39v)
Translation:

Virgin, the born
king is blessed!
The world rejoices.

Enemy, escaped
but cured.
The world rejoices.

The light dominates,
the night is separated.
The world rejoices.

Life is ready,
death was overwhelmed.
The world rejoices.

Concerning Judith Marshall's failed transcription of the ad repetendum verse (Marshall 1962, 144, ex. 6), there is a little problem caused by the negligence of the notator writing down the second voice with the second line and stanza.

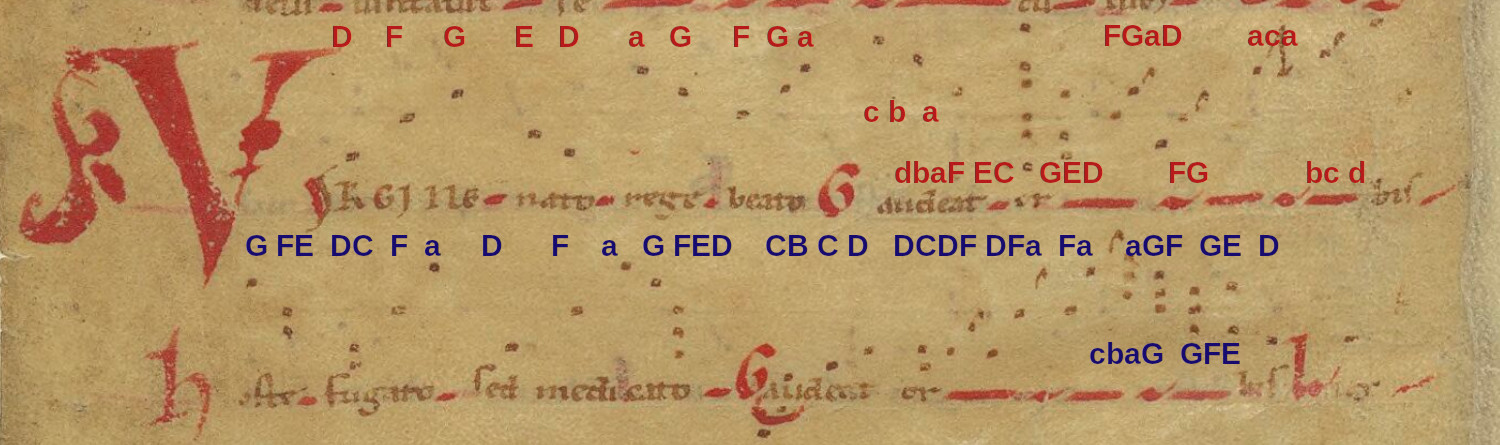
Marian versus «Virgine nato» notated as hidden polyphony in the manuscript Saint-Martial A (F-Pn lat. 1139, f.39v)

The here suggested coordination of both voices is: Gau- c—CB de- b—C at a—D or- dbaF ECG ED FGaD FFG aca bc—DCDF DFa Fa cbaG aGF GFE GE bis d—D.

Despite of melismatic setting of the verses, both voices are also crossing each other many times and it is not possible to characterise one of them as upper or lower voice. Due to the ambitus, singers might even choose a second singer with a similar range than the own voice. They usually move to each other in a counter-movement, and during melismata both voices move faster, and while doing so the interval of major second (tonus) is obviously treated as consonance, while third, sixths and semitonium are rather avoided. They occur between the voices on their way to the next concordant concordance (unison and octave), depending if the voices meet each other or move apart to the octave. As such a reconstruction should have in mind these qualities and they will embrace the particular and magic sound of eleventh-century polyphony. The often unexpected and tricky way, both voices move narrowly around each other, is rather far from the later rules of Renaissance counterpoint, and especially when singers have not yet learnt to intone the intervals according to Pythagorean tuning, they should not get trapped by their habits which might here turn out to be an obstacle. Any approach needs a fresh mind open to face what was really meant by a scribe.

Another case of hidden polyphony, although much more elaborated is the Benedicamus domino versus with the incipit «Noster cetus psallat letus» (StM A, ff.61r-v: StM C ff.30r-31r, StM D, ff.3r-v). Also here, all three versions are similar, but each one is a different realisation of the same composition, Saint-Martial D has a two-part score, while the notators of Saint-Martial A and C chose the hidden way to notate polyphony. The variants can be found in the musical text, less in the text:

Noster cetus psallat letus uoce simul consona
Ihesu* christi gloriosa recolens natalia°

Qui de celis condescendens in uirginis uterum
In eadem carne sumpta uisitauit seculum

Felix puer cuius mater incorrupta parere
Et post partum uirgo parens+ meruit existere

Hic est enim germen adae qui uenit redimere~
Et ad- celi sedem unde uoluit# reducere

Ad ipsius ergo laudes omnis nostra concio
Exultando^ regi regum benedicat domino

— Marian Christmas versus (F-Pn lat. 3719, f.30r-31r)
Translation:

Our gathering sings joyfully with a voice sounding together at once
about the glorious recollecting times of Jesus Christ's birth.

Who condescending from heavens to the uterus of the virgin
visited the century in the same chosen flesh.

Happy infant whose mother seems untouched,
and after the birth the virgin mother merited to exist.

This is indeed the sprig of Adam which came to redeem
and to restore to the seat of heaven, from where it was willing.

Then back to the same every laud in our sermon
rejoicing the ruling king praises the Lord.

Variants in StM A
*Iesu
°natalica
+manens (likewise StM D)
~verses exchanged in this stanza
-acceli
#corruit (only StM D)
^exaltata (only StM D)

While Winchester Troper, Fleury, Chartres or Saint-Maur-des-Fossés have rather examples of conventional organum (either punctum contra punctum or florid organum), this two-part versus composition made over a troped Benedicamus domino takes its motivation to experiment with polyphony by the text itself: «voce simul consona» (by a voice which sounds together at one time).

The composition was obviously done during the eleventh century, but attracted further elaboration among local cantors of the twelfth century. This is the earliest realisation:

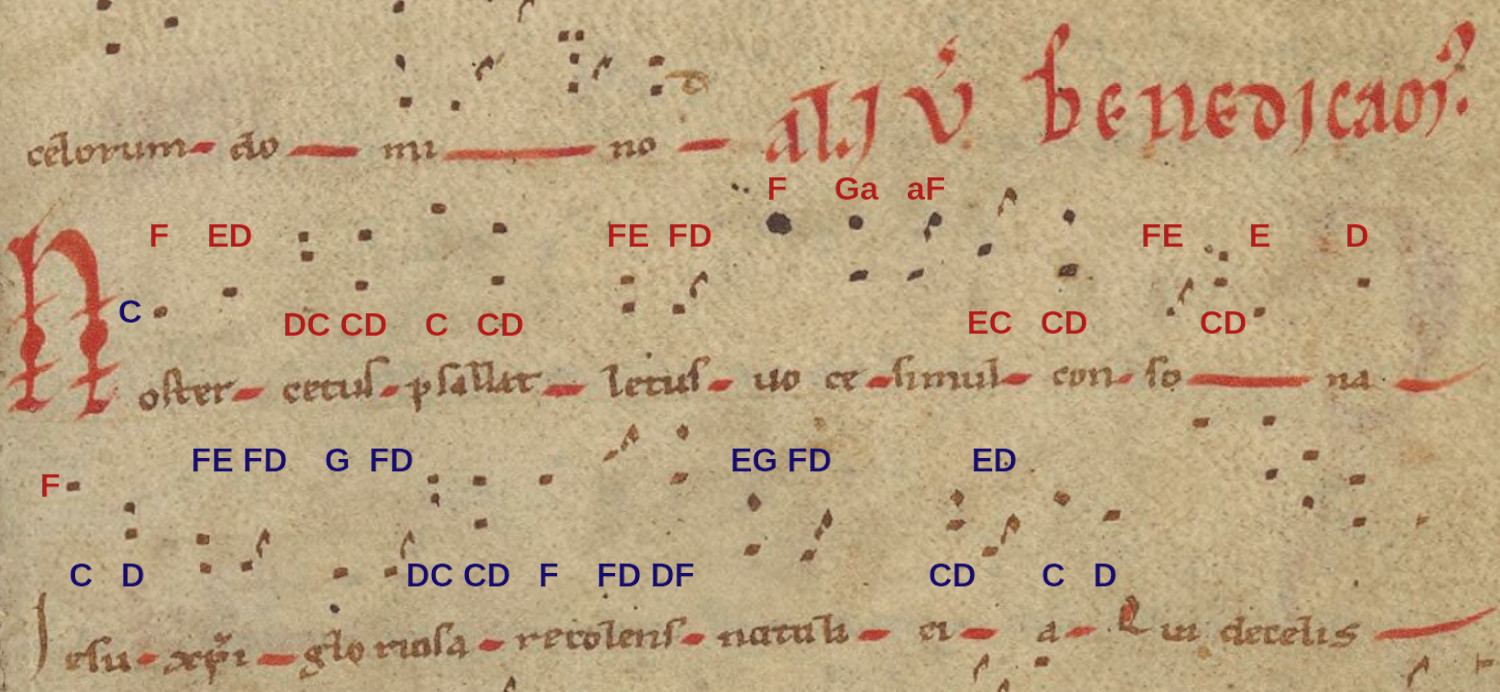
First stanza of the two-part Benedicamus domino versus «Noster cetus» at the manuscript Saint-Martial A (F-Pn lat. 1139, f.61r) notated as hidden polyphony

The annotation adds a clef to the first neume, and adds the other voice as Guidonian letters either above or below after crossing, thus, the first voice is annotated in blue, the second in red, in the second verse both cantors swap the parts. In other words: each verse pair has both parts. One singer simply follows the text and the neumes as notated, the other one sings the neumes of the second verse applying them to the text of the first verse (annotated in Guidonian letters in red), and then the neumes of the first verse applying them to the text of the second verse (annotated in Guidonian letters in blue).

Not only that both singers swap parts, they exchange voices already in each verse. With the words «Noster cetus» the first voice sings C D FE FD, over «psallat letus» the second voice almost repeats C CD FE FD. A comparison with the later cantor who notated the same composition in the manuscript Saint-Martial D as score for the first verse, while the second is left without any notation (GB-Lbl Add. Ms. 36881, f.3r), shows the ambitious effort to assimilate further these short motives changing between the vocal parts. There, the upper voice opens at «Noster cetus» GF ED DC CD, and is followed by the other voice at «psallat letus» (the first two notes notated by a liquescent flexa for the liquid "ll") G(F) ED DC CD. The notater of Saint-Martial C left the beginning unchanged, but has a quite different idea to compose both voices for the second half of the first verse:

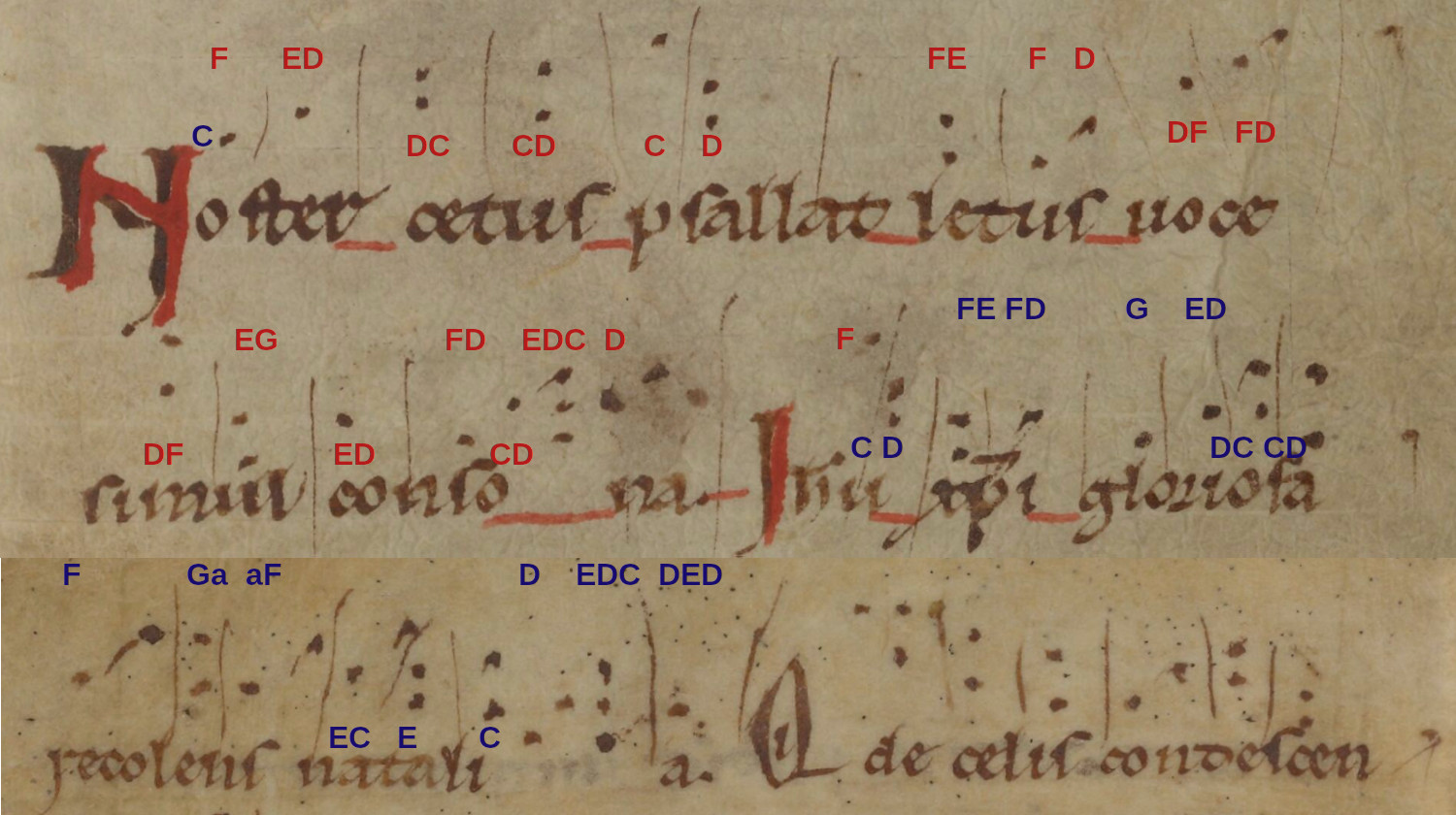
First stanza of the two-part Benedicamus domino versus «Noster cetus» at the manuscript Saint-Martial C (F-Pn lat. 3719, ff.30r-v) notated as hidden polyphony

Of course, it is possible that the scribe of Saint-Martial C knew this composition by having read the version of Saint-Martial A, but it seems more likely that she or he wrote it down after having listened to it, because the notator obviously confused in the second half both voices. The three manuscripts document several generations of local cantors between the late eleventh and early thirteenth centuries who obviously exchanged not just by reading and using notation. Thus, a "myth about a Saint-Martial school" might have been an early hypothesis, but it is not really confirmed by thorough analytical studies of the manuscripts and the different ways they notated one and the same composition, while further developing it. Another hypothesis would be more likely that the manuscripts document a living exchange between them over a longer period of time.

The comparison also reveals that the narrow position of both voices within the range of a fifth like C—G caused various problems that the notatores tried to solve individually, while the second stanza, where both voices move in counter-movement away to the octave C—c, is identical between the versions in Saint-Martial A and C. Thus, it is enough to show the easier readable manuscript Saint-Martial A:

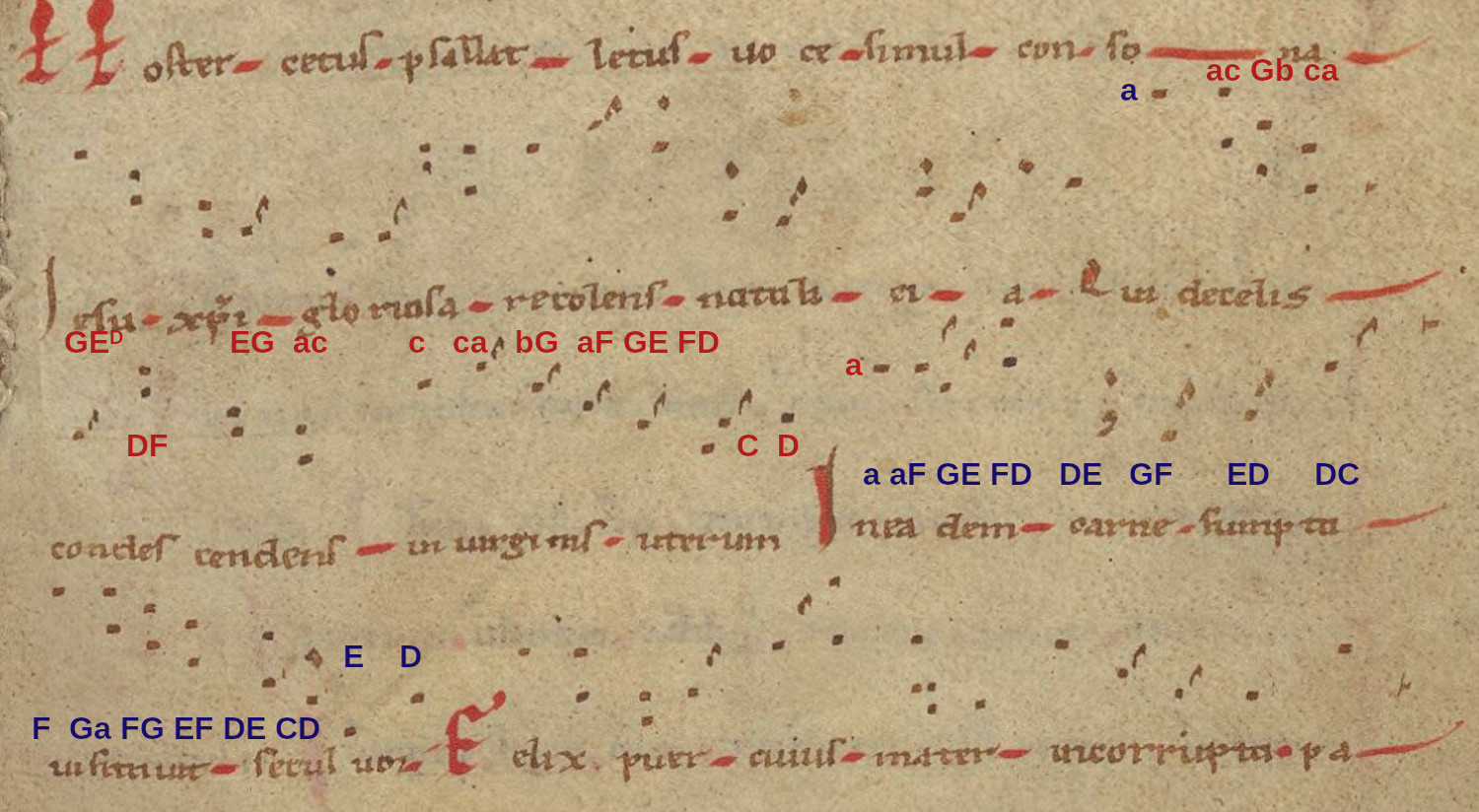
Second stanza of the two-part Benedicamus domino versus «Noster cetus» at the manuscript Saint-Martial A (F-Pn lat. 1139, f.61r) notated as hidden polyphony

Both voices move from unison on a to the fifth D—a away to the octave C—c (first half of each verse), then from the fifth F—c they come together at the unison on D. The later scribe of Saint-Martial D (GB-Lbl Add. Ms. 36881, f.3r-v) just elaborated the falling third c ca bG aF by c dc a bcb G aba F at the conclusion of each verse.

Concerning the composition of the third stanza «Felix puer», there seems in the version of Saint-Martial A a typo about the cadence at «mater» which is made by the voice notated with the second verse, but not by the other one. The transcription here has corrected the typo:

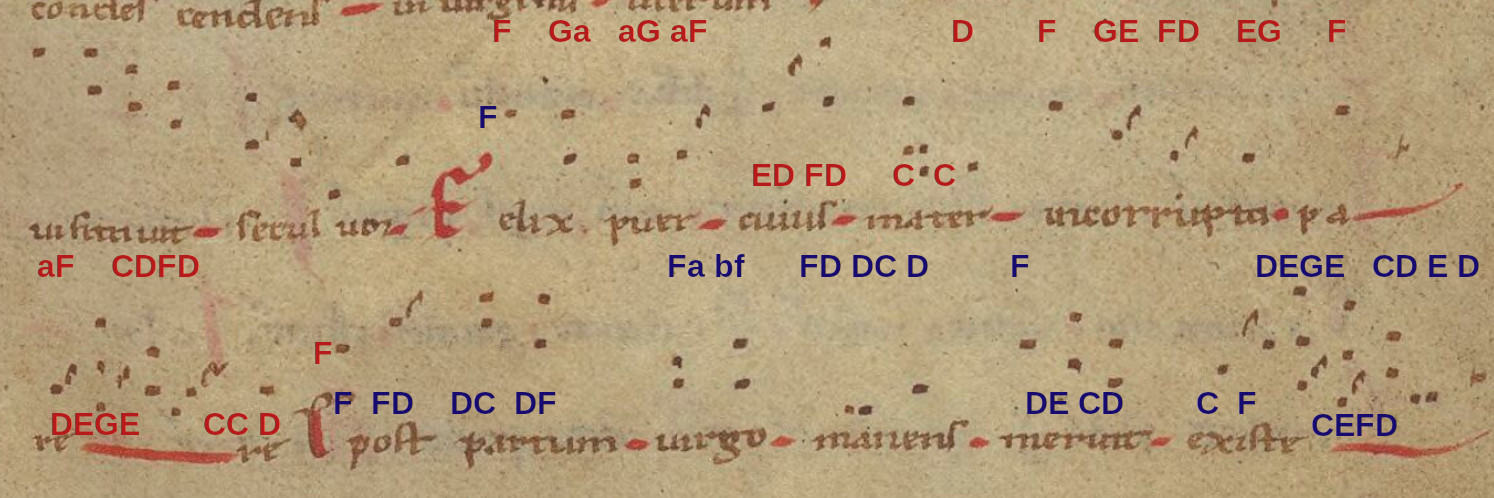
Third stanza of the two-part Benedicamus domino versus «Noster cetus» at the manuscript Saint-Martial A (F-Pn lat. 1139, f.61r) notated as hidden polyphony

As a matter of fact it provoked an alternative solution by the notator of Saint Martial C where there is a cadence on D at «mater» / «parens», but the grouping which had a remarkable effect in the versus »Virgine nato» usually provokes an unison of the voices before making an occursus on the final syllable. This time there is obviously a preference for the major second (interval «tonus»), the final intervals are G F—E D—C C—DED D:

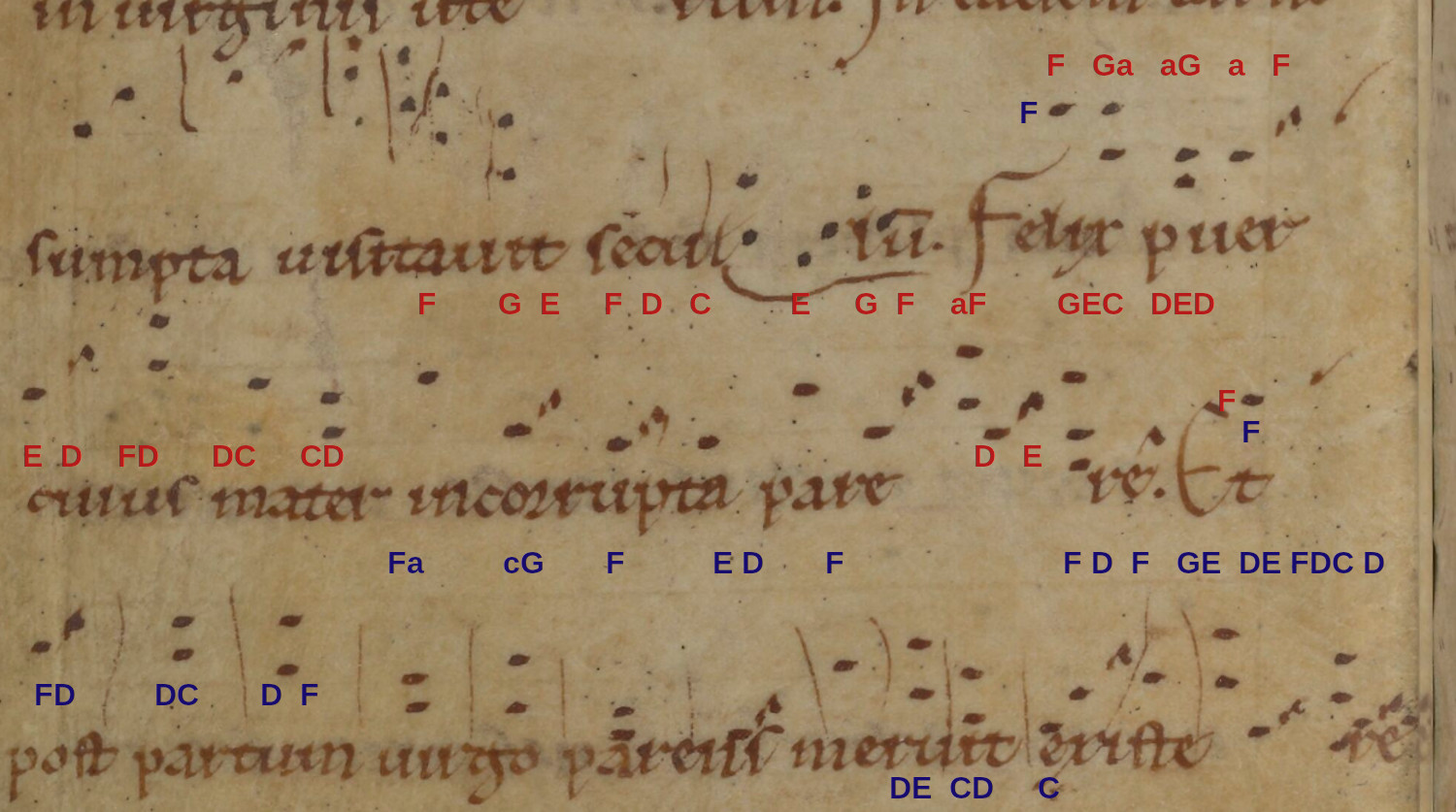
Third stanza of the two-part Benedicamus domino versus «Noster cetus» at the manuscript Saint-Martial C (F-Pn lat. 3719, f.30v) notated as hidden polyphony

The scribe of Saint-Martial D (GB-Lbl Add. Ms. 36881, f.3v, first and second double line) left the D-C ending at «mater», but simplified the sequencing pattern preceding the conclusion.

Also the remaining two stanzas are worth a complete analysis of all three versions, but in this context everything important has been found which show the particular innovation and characteristics of Aquitanian polyphony as it had been developed by the early habit of notating hidden polyphony. Similar habits can be also studied at the manuscripts of the Siculo-Norman school written by Italo-Norman cantors in Sicily and Apulia.

==== Between organum and discant, between monody and polyphony ====
The hidden way to notate polyphony has its advantages and is in many respects more clear than questions of rhythm which appear between two parts notated separately somewhere inbetween florid organum and discant. Florid organum over Benedicamus domino, like the early example added on some free space of the Troper Proser Processional of St. Martial (F-Pn lat. 1120, f.105r) by a later hand around 1100 leaves no questions open, since semicola or vertical lines in the organal voice indicate, where the tenor moves on.

The question here is, how to coordinate two florid voices?

As well in the four Saint-Martial manuscripts as concerning the Codex calixtinus there are many pieces which raise this question and prepared the next step to interpret the rhythm by modal sets of grouping at the Notre-Dame school. Sarah Fuller reported the musicological debate of rhythm concerning Aquitanian polyphony, by regarding herself together with Peter Wagner, Marianne Danckwardt, Wulf Arlt and Richard Crocker as part of a free-rhythmic approach, while Friedrich Ludwig, Leo Treitler, Theodore Karp and Hendrik van der Werf project later forms of modal or even mensural organisation on the Aquitanian polyphonic repertory. Similar is the understanding of the question of liturgical genres. While certain scholars project thirteenth-century genres like motet and conductus (which are not supported by rubrics of the contemporary scribes, since they are often simply missing) on it, she summarised the polyphonic repertory of Saint Martial as follows:

The total corpus of Aquitanian polyphony consists of some 70 pieces: 49 versus (see §II, 2), 12 proses (sequences), 2 prosae to responds, 3 plain Benedicamus Domino versicles, 2 prayers, a hymn and one epistle. The versus, which constitute over two thirds of the repertory, subdivide into one group of ordinary versus (29 pieces) and another of Benedicamus Domino versus (20 pieces). The latter typically conclude with the versicle Benedicamus Domino, or some variant of it. Apart from this difference, the two kinds of versus share a common musical and poetic style.

Both musically and textually the polyphonic Aquitanian versus appears to be the precursor of the polyphonic Parisian conductus. Like the conductus, its texts are rhymed, strophic, accentual poetry and deal predominantly with themes of the Incarnation and Virgin Birth appropriate to Christmastide. Similarly, its two voices are governed by principles of discant and may break into expansive melismas during the course of a piece. Two compositions, one the frequently printed Stirps Jesse, superficially resemble the motet in their combination of an active upper voice presenting a long poetic text with a slower lower voice that is a liturgical Benedicamus Domino melody. However, the nature and context of these pieces indicate that they are experimental Benedicamus Domino versus that have no historical connection with the motet either in procedure or in influence.

The latter statement about influence might be well debatable, but fact is, there is no evidence about the use of motet and conductus as a rubrified term in any source of the twelfth century (with the exception of Norman Sicily since 1150 whose manuscripts had sometimes a libellus for conductus). Thus, even if a versus had an influence on the later genre conductus, a composing cantor of the eleventh century could not have known that the own versus was anything else. And concerning the Benedicamus domino versus, the rubric did well exist, but the method of classification proposed by Fuller does not work with many compositions rubrified as such.

One example for a style somehow inbetween monody and polyphony as well as inbetween organum and discant is the versus «Senescente mundano filio» which is preserved in Saint-Martial A (F-Pn lat. 1139, f.52v) as a monophonic composition and in Saint-Martial B (F-Pn lat. 3549, f.153r-v) added with a florid second voice over it. As such it belonged to the liturgical drama Sponsus (F-Pn lat. 1139, ff.52v-53v). The verses are short and very simple, but not the music:

Senescente mundano filio
quem fovebat mentis oblivio
Venit sponsus divina ratio
Comes eius restauracio

Sola virgo regalis filia
Digna dignis parat ospicia
Apta comes replet palatia
Aulam sponsus intrat per hostia

— Versus of Sponsus drama (F-Pn lat. 3549, f.153r-v)
Translation:

As the mundane son was growing older
who favoured the forgetfulness of his mind,
came the bridegroom with divine reason,
his companion in recreation:

The only virgin, the royal daughter,
prepares the worthy guestrooms with dignity,
fills as companion again the suitable Palatine hill,
the bridegroom enters the hall for a sacrificial offering.

With a look at the monophonic composition in Saint-Martial A, one might find a suitable candidate of a rubrified versus which has many stylistic aspects of a later genre that a composer of the Notre Dame school could have called a conductus, but such an imagination does not prove that the approach was identical almost 150 years later. But it is simply possible to look at the development between the monophonic composition dating back to the eleventh century and the addition of a second more florid voice about 100 years later, especially in a case where it also changed the "cantus" or better principle voice, since it already existed, when the organal voice was added. It has definitely everything which could justify the term of a "school" between cantors, if such a justification was ever needed.

The poem is already strange, because the «comes» in the fourth and seventh verse, has a possessive «eius» which does not refer to the bride, but likely to «deus» who is not mentioned in the eight verses, but only attributed through the bride as «divina ratio» and «sola virgo», but both must be referred to as feminin: «comes eiae». Thus, «comes» must refer directly to the bride and «eius» to «sponsus». Beyond any doubt there is a mysterious double existence between the «filio» at the beginning and the «sponsus» in the second half of the first stanza. The surprising turn comes with the last verse, when the groom enters the hall for offering a sacrifice, it was obviously connected with the celebration of a communion, and it is possible that this composition could have had a similar ritual function like an offertorium.

The musical composition which organises each half of the stanza (two verses) as a unit, is very likely the weirdest of the Aquitanian repertory of polyphonic compositions. Each musical phrase is designed in a unique way and has very few in common with the others, except that most of them have strong concordances like octave or unison somewhere inbetween (exceptionally at the beginning), but generally concluded with a less strong concordance—a fifth over the finalis or even a fourth under it.

The analysis starts with the beginning of the second stanza (verses 5 and 6), not only because it is the shortest of four parts, but as a musical setting also truly a scandal from a historical point of view and its use of dissonances as parallel intervals. The way it was constructed is extremely simple and completely different from the other three parts, and these verses alone refer directly to the bride:

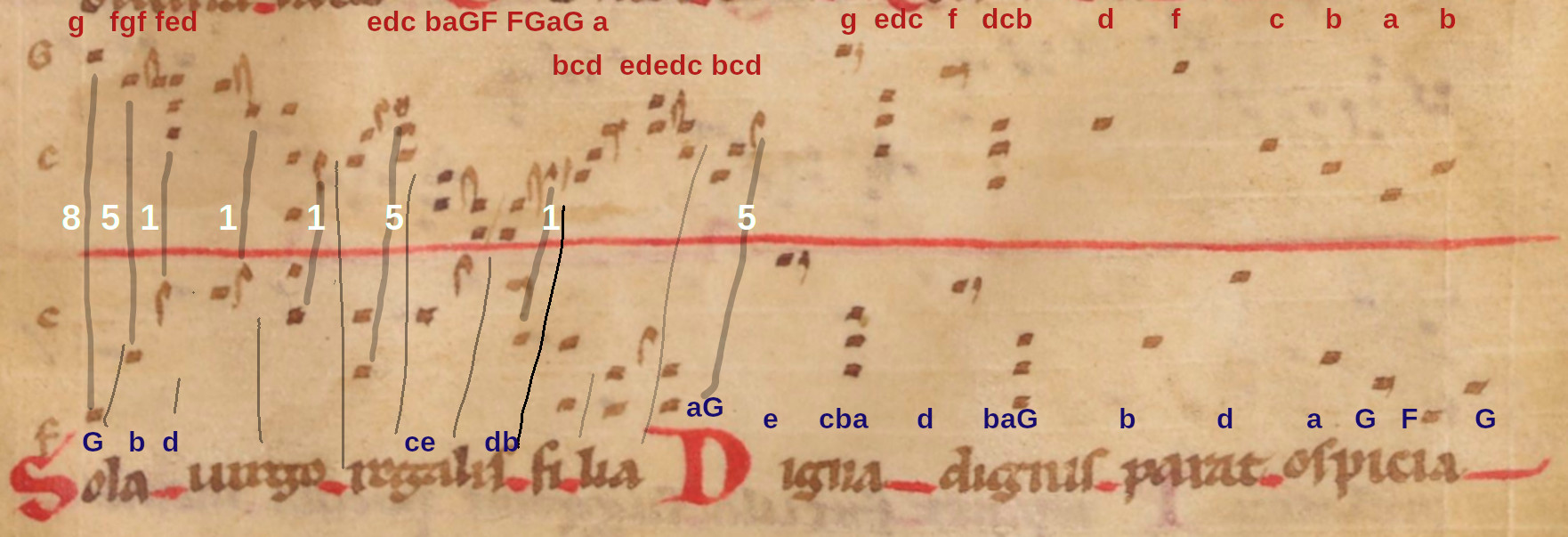
Versus «Senescente mundano» of the drama Sponsus (verses 5 and 6) notated with Aquitanian neumes in the manuscript Saint-Martial B (F-Pn lat. 3549, f.153r)

What is really weird for a composition appearing in a manuscript which had been written during the second half of the twelfth century, is the setting of the sixth verse using the adjective «digna» and the adverb «dignis» which is simply a negation of musical composition. The movement in parallel thirds, later, when it came into use, called gymel, is so unlikely, because it was not regarded by contemporary cantors in their theoretical explanations as a stable interval, but as a rough dissonance, because neither the ditonus (81:64) nor the sum of a tonus and a semitonium (32:27) had anything in common with the harmonic intervals (5:4 and 6:5) that a musician nowadays has in mind. While Guido of Arezzo called the combination of three voices surrounding the cantus by an octave founded on the lower fourth as «aptae copulationes vocum» ("suitable connections of voices"), this one was definitely not suitable and must be courageously intonated with the required roughness. Most of the musicians, even professionals, rarely reach such a level of performance which requires continuous hard work for a couple of years. But thirds are definitely the key to the third part of this organum, either in a horizontal (verse 5) or in a vertical context (verse 6).

But it is useful to start the analysis from here, because the horizontal context is in fact not a question of rhythm and tempo, but the question about where both voices will come out on stable intervals with simple proportions such as tonus (9:8), fourth (4:3), fifth (3:2), unison (1) or octave (2). Some singers might prefer an improvisation-like rubato, others imitating Dominique Vellard or Ensemble Sequentia a fast tempo to reach the stable interval, but they need to know, where exactly they will meet together. As such a recording like this is very useful, even if their intonation of thirds and sixths is ahistorical. Concerning the annotation of the manuscript, these gatherings are marked by vertical connections with its interval specified by a number in white colour (8 for octave, 5 for fifth, 4 for fourth and 1 for unison), and sometimes the notator did not manage well to adjust them vertically. Only where the vertical position is unclear, the pitch of the voices is annotated in red (upper voice) and blue (lower voice) by Guidonian letters. The coordination with the syllables is indicated by vertical thin lines, where it is not clear, when the singers continue with the next syllable. The difference to the recording is just that there is no reason to interrupt the melisma after the first two notes over the fourth syllable, the notator clearly wrote four notes for the upper voice which is not difficult to arrange with the two notes of the lower voice.

For the first two parts a comparison shows a parallel structure which has many in common:

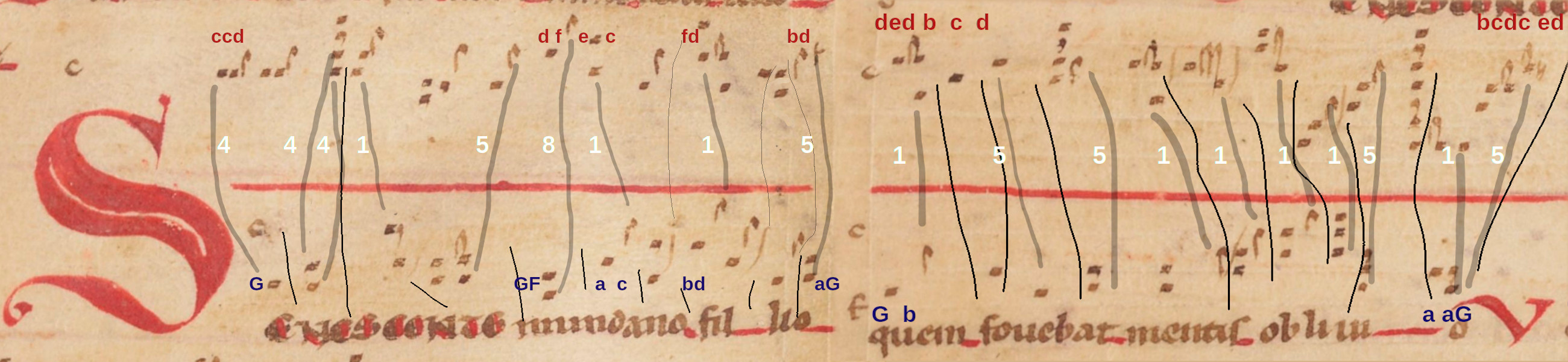
Versus «Senescente mundano» of the drama Sponsus (verses 1 and 2) notated with Aquitanian neumes in the manuscript Saint-Martial B (F-Pn lat. 3549, f.153r)

And the continuation of the first stanza:

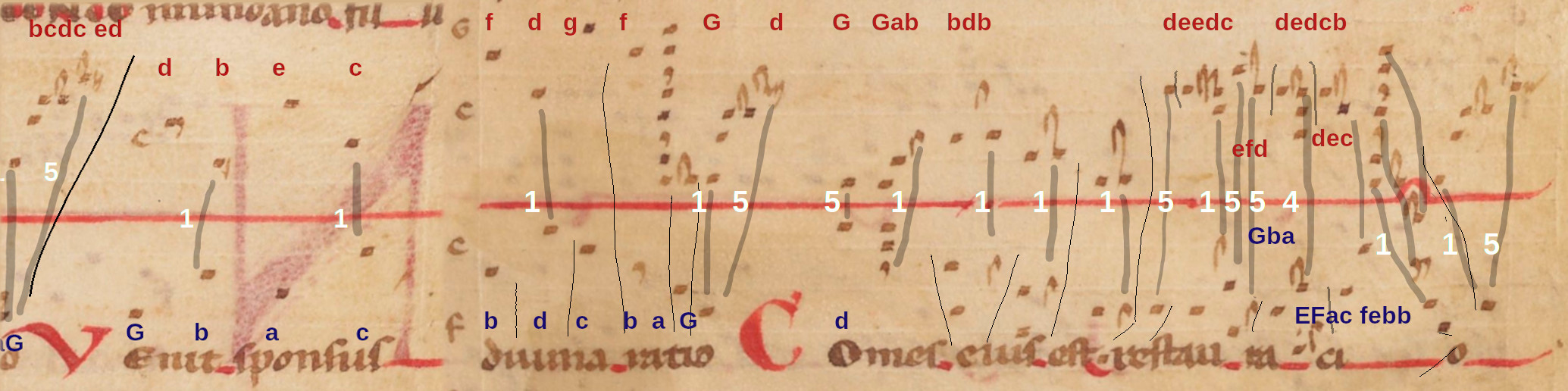
Versus «Senescente mundano» of the drama Sponsus (verses 3 and 4) notated with Aquitanian neumes in the manuscript Saint-Martial B (F-Pn lat. 3549, f.153r)

Just for the fourth verse, the lower voice starts a fifth higher (voice exchange, although the upper voice concludes each verse on the fifth to the finalis G: G—d.

During the first verse the last word «filio» raises the question, whether the upper voice has to start on a f sharp over the b quadratum which moves up to an unison on d? The word is concluded by this cadence: fi- fdedb c-bd ac li- cb-Gb o d-aG.

The following three verses conclude with stylistic elements of florid organum, usually a chain of subpunctis beginning on a minor seventh: oblivi- bcd fedcbaG-baG o aG G bcdc ed-aa G. The conclusive cadence on an unison of G opens to the fifth G-d.

In contrast, the words «venit sponsus divina» are reduced to punctum-contra-punctum progressions moving between fifth and unison, not even a pneumatic setting like in the hidden polyphony examples. The former cadence elaborates further: ra- f# gfedcbaG-b ti- aG-a o G bcdc ed-G.

What is particularly interesting here, that this organum composition requires f sharp, which was very rare even during the twelfth century. But there was one contemporary organum treatise which considered such a necessity, and that was one written not somewhere in Aquitaine, but at the early Parisian Notre Dame school in Léonin's time, the 1170s:

Multa enim perturbatio uenit in superiore parte manus per b quadratum, vbi multi errant, quia semper oportet, quod, quando mi canitur in be fa b mi, quod aliud mi cantetur in f ut altum, et fa in g sol re ut, et re in e la mi, et alia non potest fieri, et ideo ponitur in b rotundum. Vnde oportet quod b rotundum habeat suas facturas per se et b quadratum suas.
Thus, much trouble comes in the upper part of the [Guidonian] hand concerning b quadratum, where many go wrong, because it is always opportune, that in case, when a mi is sung on b [fa b mi], that another mi is sung on f ut high up [by a fourth hexachord on d ut], and fa on g sol re ut as well as re on e la mi, and therefore b rotundum is set [in the cantus], if it cannot be done otherwise. From there it is right that b rotundum has its own deed and b quadratum another one.

— Ars organi (Godt & Rivera 1984, 297f)

Obviously, experiments at Limoges had already touched this problem like in case of this additional voice for the versus «Senescente mundano».

This is a possible reconstruction based on the monophonic composition and its change between the syllables of the text: re- d-G stau- deedc efd-GcaFG ra-dedcb-Gba EF ci- dec fed cb aG aG-ac fe— bb G— F o G bcdc ed-G. Over the fourth syllable of «restauracio» both voices meet on the unison on c, then continue together fe, then bb in the cantus together with the step cb, then G until the end, and F for the step aG in the upper voice.

On folio 153 verso, there is the case that the scriptor has left too much space for the notator. It is crucial to compare the original with the next annotated picture, where the distance in the lower voice to the last two notes was adapted (see f.153v). The singers documented by the recording interpreted the G clef as a corrected c clef in order to conclude the whole composition on an unison at the finalis G.

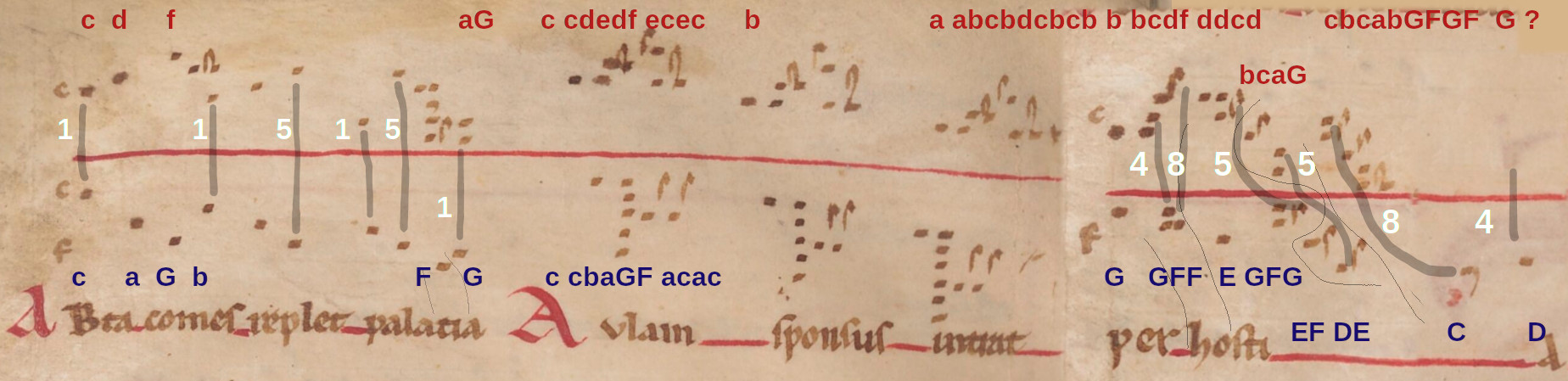
Versus «Senescente mundano» of the drama Sponsus (verses 7 and 8) notated with Aquitanian neumes in the manuscript Saint-Martial B (F-Pn lat. 3549, f.153v)

Anyway the last verse does not follow the monophonic version of the cantus as notated in Saint–Martial A (f.52v).

There is a more plausible possibility, although the notator obviously made the mistake to modify a sequencing pattern in the lower voice, but not in the upper voice. As already written the sequencing pattern is repeated once, before it descends about one step the third time, but the cantor who composed the two-part version intended to change the cantus, descending each time. Thus, the third time he has to modify the end of the pattern.

Since a custos indicate at the end of the first line a continuation on G, the G clef at the second line of the lower voice was obviously set correct. What needs to be corrected is the upper voice, so that it will come out at b. Thus, the third sequencing pattern on a could be modified this way: instead of a abcbdcaca it could be modified to a abcbdcbcb.

The result will be a particular conclusion on the plagal lower tetrachord, but instead of d-aG or G bcdc ed-G like in the preceding verses, the conclusive cadence could aim at G-D. Such an extraordinary plagal conclusion would correspond to the text of the last verse.

Unfortunately, it is left to the imagination of musicians today, because the work of the notator in this manuscript seems to have left unfinished.

==== The local focus on language ====
During the late eleventh century, only a very few composers of the school are known by name, and the new poetic and musical experiments were not only in Latin, they obviously concerned also the local language Old Occitan and inspired as well courtly poetry of the Troubadours which just started by the end of the eleventh century.

Even if liturgical poetry (versus, tropes and sequences) at Saint Martial Abbey was almost entirely in Latin, three melodies collected in the manuscripts of the Abbey have versus poetry composed partly or entirely in Old Occitan language. Before the collections of the chansonniers, there are already contemporary Old Occitan songs with musical notation for all stanzas like O Maria, Deu maire.

These experiments even included bilinguality. The Christmas hymn «In hoc anni circulo» is the first time documented as a versus composed of verses in Latin and Old Occitan language (F-Pn lat. 1139, ff.48r-49r). The versus has sometimes a Latin, sometimes an Occitan conclusion with stanzas alternating in Latin and Occitan, and it begins:

In hoc anni circulo
uita datur seculo
nato nobis paruulo
De uirgine maria

Mei amic e mei fiel
laisat estur lo gazel
apprendet us o noel
De uirgine maria

Fons de suo riuulo
nascitur pro populo
necto mortis uinculo
De uirgine maria

Lais l'om dire chi no u sab
qu'eu no'l dirai ses nul gab
mout n'em issit a bo chab
De uirgine maria

Quod uetustas suffocat
hoc ad uitam reuocat
nam se deus collocat
De uirgine maria

— Marian Christmas versus (F-Pn lat. 1139, f.48r)
Translation:

During the cycle of the year
life was given in the century,
to us was born a very young
By the virgin Mary

My friends and my faithful
let away the babble
learn the new custom
About the virgin Mary

The source of her rivolet
is born in favour of the people
bound by the chain of death
By the virgin Mary

Let say to the human who does not know,
that if he did say nothing than a flout
many comes out to a good presage
About the virgin Mary

What antiquity suffocates
that calls back to life,
because God sets in order
Through the virgin Mary

Not only the languages change, but also the way of speaking. The Occitan verses directly and colloquially address the community and their earthly ways, while the Latin verses speak about the salvation of Christianity by the birth of a child which is called «parvulus»—a poor, small and innocent child who was sent as a heavenly present («pro populo necto mortis vinculo»). Even if the earthly beings are not well provided to understand such a miracle (the Occitan verses mention "flouts" and "babble": «gab» & «gazel»), they cannot do much about it. It will break that chain of death. While in Latin the verse «De virgine Maria» would be best translated as "About the virgin Mary", in context of the Occitan language it is better translated "by the virgin Mary" like the following versus says which was composed entirely in Occitan «Deus de femna nasquet» ("God is born from a woman"). It corresponds here to the conclusion of the first stanza «nobis natus est parvulo de virgine Maria». This fashion of Marian devotion was completely new and was right in the focus of the new poetic genre versus which had to fill the gap of the abandoned Latin compositions of tropi and sequentiae.

The reconstruction of the notated melody can be done with the echema (intonation formula) of the «Plagi protus» NOEAGIS according to Adémar's tonary (see above). The range is between F and d and the finalis is a re:

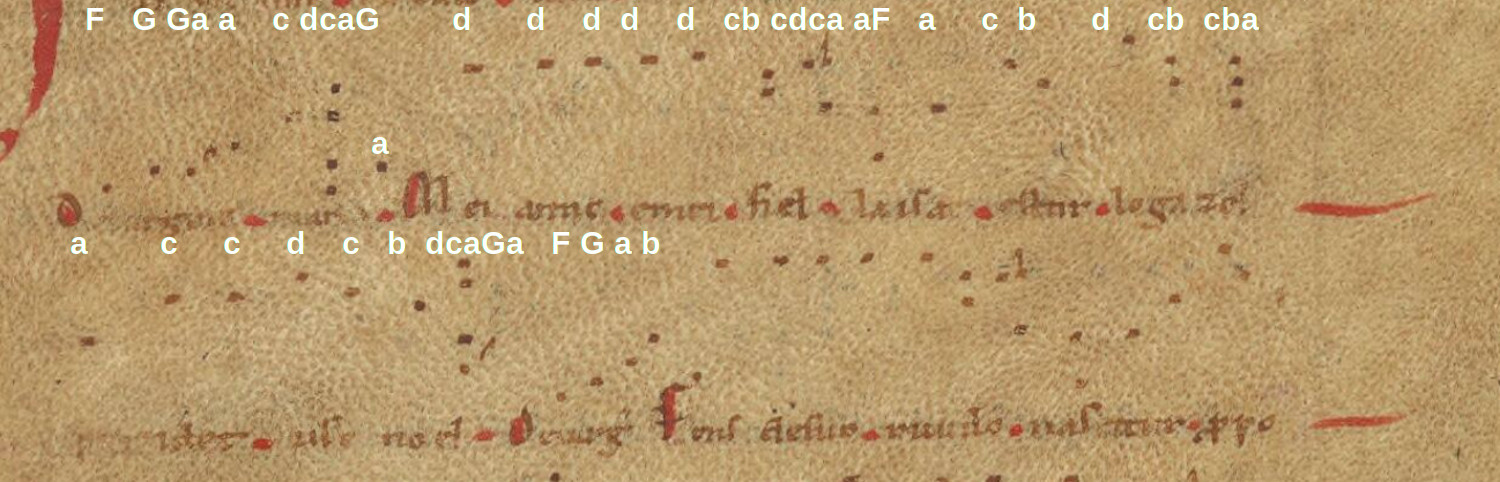
First Occitan stanza of the bilingual versus «In hoc anni circulo» notated with Aquitanian neumes (F-Pn lat. 1139, f.48r) with the preceding written out refrain «De virgine maria»

Despite of the strophic nature of this versus, each stanza has been notated throughout into neumes. Thus, the careful adaption to the verses of various stanzas can be studied in detail.

Remarkable are also alternative last verses to «De virgine maria» or over the same melody «E virgine maria» which had been always notated in full the first time:

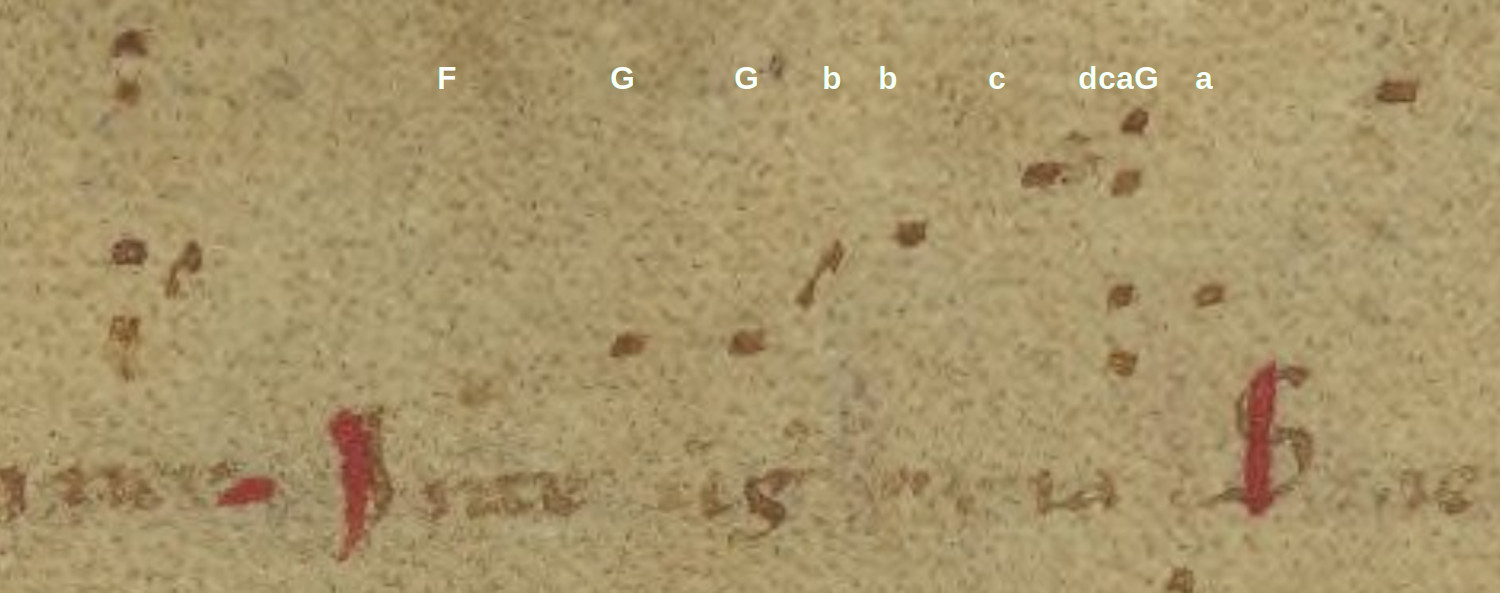
Alternative last verse in Latin «In te, virgo Maria» used several times within the bilingual versus «In hoc anni circulo» (F-Pn lat. 1139, f.48r)

This verse concludes the first time the Occitan stanza «So sabiat», it follows the Latin stanza «Sine viri copula».

Quite different is the melody of the Occitan variant «Pois virgo maria»:

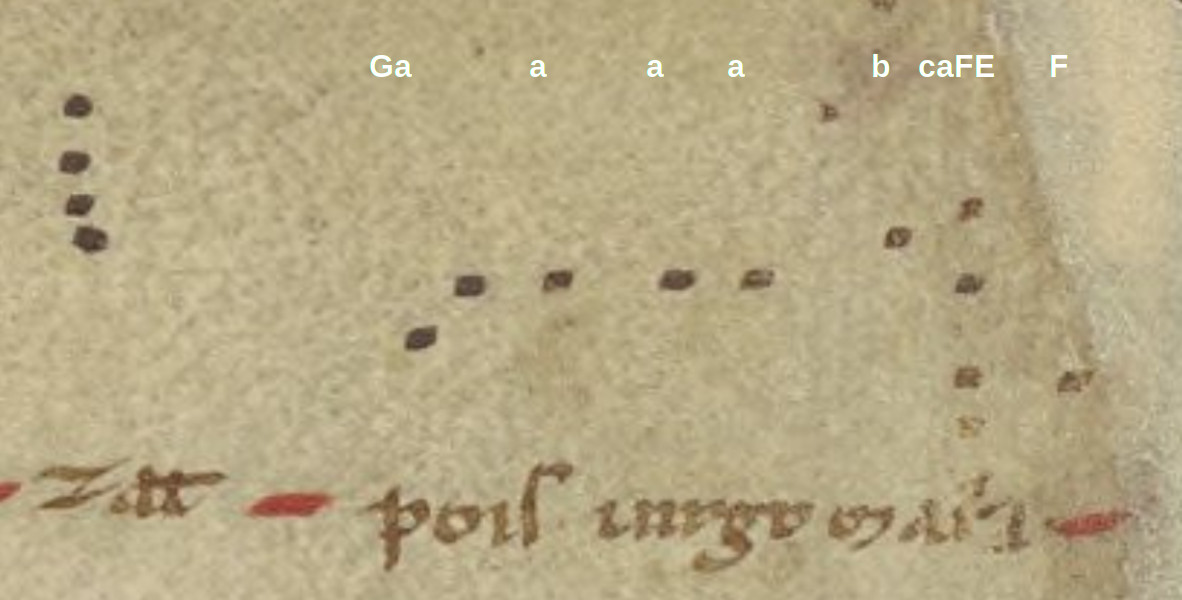
Alternative last verse in Occitan «Pois virgo maria» used several times within the bilingual versus «In hoc anni circulo» (F-Pn lat. 1139, f.48v)

This verse concludes the first time the Occitan stanza «Non perdrai virginitat», it follows the Latin stanza «Summi patri filio».

A third Latin variant is only used once as conclusion of the Occitan stanza «Tu es mesatjes» which addresses the virgin directly, and it is a kind of response:

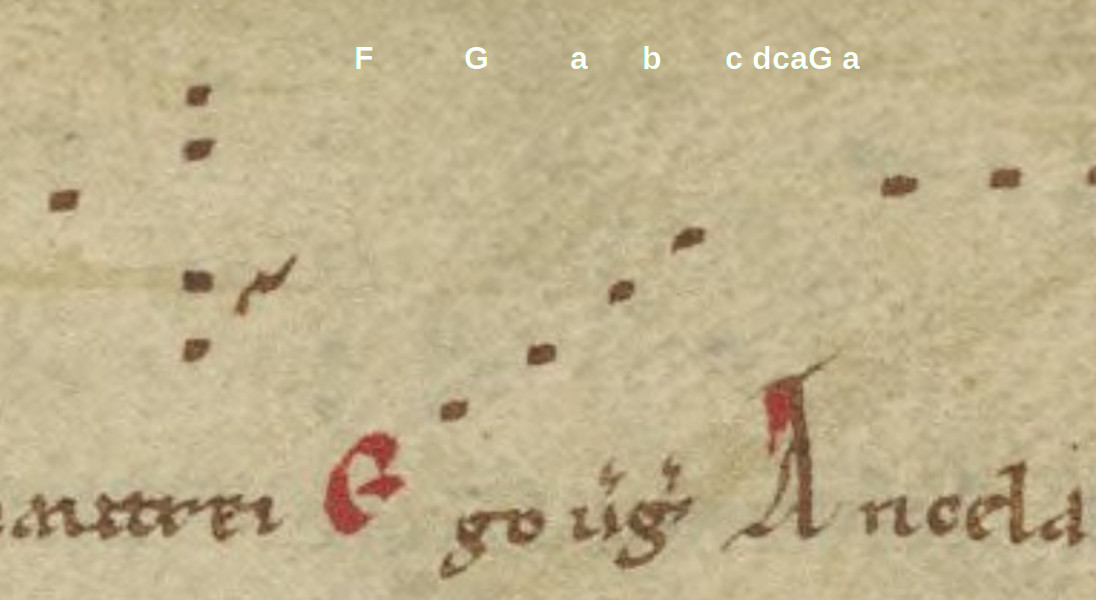
Alternative last verse in Latin «Ego virgo maria» within the bilingual versus «In hoc anni circulo» (F-Pn lat. 1139, f.49r)

The different conclusions of each stanza show in part the principle of cordal poem which binds three verses with changing rhymes by a unique verse which seems to conclude each stanza at the beginning. The whole poem has eighteen stanzas and the alternation with Latin language is maintained for fourteen stanzas, the last four stanzas with the Latin response by Saint Mary are composed in Occitan verses, the stanza «Ancela soi damrideu» is concluded by «E pois» and finally twice by «De virgine maria». The dramaturgy of this long bilingual composition was carefully planned, each melodic variant of the strophe dealing with the various verses was documented by the notator.

It shows that aristocratic circles present at Limoges and its Abbey have been closely related to those of the troubadours, and that Marian devotion, but also interaction with written transmission to compose verses and music, influenced troubadours poetry from the very beginning.

== Re-evaluation of a so-called Saint Martial school ==
Recent research had anyway revealed that the focus polyphony, even if certain experiments between tropus and organum had been unique and cannot be found elsewhere, is not open and wide enough to describe all innovations made by cantors associated with Limoges or other parts of Aquitaine.

Since James Grier's important studies and books had finally localised two names known as Roger and Adémar de Chabannes, one must correct former inadequate fixations on the later four famous manuscripts.

Both cantors had neither invented diastematic Aquitanian notation nor the local use of tonaries, they were their school since they made later additions in some of them (already present at local manuscripts such as F-Pn lat. 1118, 1120 and 1084), but they had improved both to make them more readable. The later manuscripts written after 1070 often did not care about improvements of such a careful notator that Adémar was (best documented by the manuscripts F-Pn lat. 1121 and 909). Instead a lot of agogic details got lost by the use of Aquitanian point notation, a general loss which became common elsewhere during the late twelfth and the thirteenth centuries.

Thus, the earlier generations of a Saint-Martial school rather avoided polyphonic experiments which existed elsewhere since the ninth century, a local repertoire of tropi and sequentiae was the main occupation of these generations which was already well established by the time of Roger and Adémar as musical and poetic composers.

The question about periphery and centre had to do with trouble that musicologists had to face up new findings in political historiography by Dominique Iogna-Prat (1998) concerning Cluny as the leading centre of liturgical reforms which had a particular impact on Gallia. This is also true for Aquitaine, because the local repertoire of tropi and sequentiae came into disrepute by the last decades of the eleventh century, although it was and is an important part of the local heritage at Limoges. The whole discussion about periphery and centre missed completely its point, because it was just focussed on the codicological problem, that the repertories of tropi and sequentiae were clearly local, while the later fashion on versus which replaced the former local repertories, was either innovative to a degree that was unknown outside Aquitaine (even in Winchester or in Ile-de-France or Chartres), but it clearly went on without any local focus (with the exception of Occitan language which was at least as local as liturgical and paraliturgical customs of Limoges, but unknown and innovative at the same time), after a local school and its contributions had been radically abandoned.

Thus, even the article at the New Grove Dictionary which was realised by two authors, Alejandro Planchart for monophonic compositions mainly focussed on the early Saint Martial school and Sarah Fuller for the later polyphonic compositions since the late eleventh century, clearly missed to put the pieces together—even if Fuller's point of view, clearly aware of projections since Guido Dreves and Friedrich Ludwig coming from the later Notre Dame school talking about later genres like conductus and motetus which were not yet known to Aquitanian composers of the eleventh century, was on the best way to meet similar discussions concerning a new meaning of Marian devotion in later Old Occitan poetry thanks to the new role of the genre versus.

Therefore a scholarly focus on a Saint-Martial school must concentrate on monophonic as well as polyphonic experiments in various genres of the local liturgical chant and, facing a long period between the late tenth until the first half of the thirteenth centuries, should be aware about its transformations caused by changes in church history and dictated by political circumstances.

Already during the late eleventh century, the new favoured genre was a new trope genre—the Marian versus which had not only linguistic aspects (like the use of Occitan language in a para-liturgical context and in reciprocal relation to local contemporary trobadours poetry which even developed a Marian impact on local vernacular poetry), but also marks the period, when local cantors got involved in the composition of polyphony for the first time in local history. Nevertheless, even this new appetite for polyphony does not justify in any way to neglect their experiments in the field of monophonic compositions. The versus «Senescente mundano filio» was already an experiment in its monophonic form documented in Saint-Martial A, before it was further developed by the addition of a second voice during the twelfth century, the transition of elaborated monody to polyphonic composition was just the last step of a long creative process which had already started (even before Roger and Adémar de Chabannes) with local tonaries.

Concerning the history of neume notation, the Aquitanian school provided optimal conditions for the development of new polyphonic forms, and the hidden form was an important one for the early development. France was not the only place, where a vertically adjusted notation became diastematic (the same is true for Beneventan neumes used in various parts of Italy, but the notators had always to connect far away dots). The Aquitanian neumes in comparison could be divided and separated, but the parts were visible as belonging together. Still the late modal notation of the Notre-Dame school profited from these possibilities dealing with troped forms like motets and conductus, because the groups establishing the rhythm were still recognizable.

But music history cannot be reduced to the evolution of notation and written transmission, also codicological and sociological aspects like the development of a new culture and the development of new books should be considered and this concerns the high impact on new liturgical books (concerning the organisation of the Magnus liber and its use of book-painting which was not purely decorative) on the early Parisian Notre-Dame school under Léonin and the long-term development of an Old French repertoire of songs and conductus within the later manuscripts of the Magnus liber.

Although the sources of concordance were known to Sarah Fuller, the Aquitanian heritage and the way of successive notation of hidden polyphony was continued in newly founded church provinces of the Norman kingdom of Sicily like in the Norman cathedrals of Palermo or Catania. The oldest manuscript of this group was a troper proser sequentiary with tonary of Palermo written about 1100 (E-Mn Ms. 288). The manuscript was still written in the adiastematic central French neumes, but without the letter notation of William of Volpiano's school, the notators rather tried to adjust the signs vertically and out of this approach a central French square notation evolved which preserved agogic details of the neumes. Very similar to the trend of Aquitanian versaria was the organization of the libelli structure of Siculo-Norman manuscripts. The troper was reduced to ordinary mass chant and the kyrial sometimes included a preces collection, the sequentiary and offertorial was organised in an almost Aquitanian fashion, the proser was separated from sequentiae but related to additional tropes to the responsoria prolixa of the antiphonary which had been in this case written out, also versus known from Aquitaine were included that the proser was actually rather a troper. The proser was followed by a collection of Benedicamus domino chant, some of them troped, others not. They were followed by Benedicamus domino versus. The first of the collection is «Corde patris» which the scribe of the versarium of Saint-Martial A classified as simple versus (F-Pn lat. 1139, f.38r), but the version of Palermo has more verses and concludes with «benedicamus domino». Nevertheless, the repertory of these Benedicamus domino versus is the same like the one of the Aquitanian versaria.

The later twelfth-century manuscripts of Sicily have in their chant books organised in various libelli conductus, Benedicamus domino versus and liturgical drama sections many in common with habits of Aquitanian scribes and notators, not just concerning the innovative aesthetic style of the music, also theological motives like «stirps iesse» (describing the virgin as a descendant of David), and many well-known melodies corresponding to the so-called four "versaria" known as Saint-Martial A, B, C and D. An example could be the troper proser processional of Palermo (E-Mn Ms. 289) which has many compositions of the Aquitanian versus repertory, partly with a new or modified text and the chant slightly modified:

- «Letabundus exultat» (f.141v), here rubrified as conductus, which was taken from the prosulae collection of Saint-Martial A (f.86v).
- The bilingual Christmas versus «In hoc anni circulo» without the Occitan stanzas and as conductus reworked with a second refrain «Verbum caro factum» and additional stanzas (f.147r) of Saint-Martial A (f.48r).
- The Benedicamus domino versus «Congaudeat turba fidelium» with slightly modified melody (f.128r) in comparison with the version of Saint-Martial A (f.61v), the rest of the first verse has been recomposed, but everything is composed around the conclusion «in bethlehem». The Norman poets in Sicily added some more stanzas to celebrate the feast of epiphany.
- The Benedicamus domino versus «Castitatis lilium effloruit» (f.130r) in comparison with the version of Saint-Martial A (f.42r).
- The conductus «Natus est natus est natus est hodie dominus» (f.144v). The composition over the text concluding «et moritur mors» which has been collected in Dreves' edition, is composed over the clausula «mors» taken as cantus from the Easter alleluia verse «Christus resurgens», but it is older than the Notre Dame school, very likely from the manuscript of Beauvais (GB-Lbl Egerton MS 2615, f.49v). The earlier text composed in Sicily is full of Marian motives taken from Aquitanian versus such as «in virgine palacio ut sponsus ex thalamo processit ex utero», «flos de iesse virgula», «Quando flos iste nascitur diabolus confundetur et moritur mors», «stella maris inclua eternum florem prodica» etc.
- Versus (not rubrified, more likely as "conductus" like other versus) «O primus homo corruit qui nos perdiderat» (f.156r) monophonic version based on a similar principle voice of the two-part versus «O primus homo coruit in fraude feminea» in Saint Martial B (ff.152r-153r). Obviously the text was just recomposed using the four first words of the versus as a poetic subject, while adapting the melody to the new text which only roughly follows the Aquitanian versus following the beginning of the verse pairs and its cadences.

Thus, a Saint-Martial school had very well existed over many generations of cantors based at Limoges and it also made school elsewhere, not only at Notre-Dame de Paris, but also earlier at Norman cathedrals on the island of Sicily. And the only plausible explanation is that Cluny as the European reform centre had once educated the Norman founding abbots like William of Volpiano, and that the new scriptoria established on Sicily and elsewhere in Southern Italy were less descendants of Volpiano's school than of a later approach to Cluny like in Burgundy (Nevers) and Aquitaine.

== See also ==
- Adémar de Chabannes
- Winchester Troper
- Troubadours
- Notre-Dame school
- Léonin
- Arlt, Wulf (1986). "«Nova Cantica» Grundsätzliches und Spezielles zur Interpretation musikalischer Texte des Mittelalters". Basler Jahrbuch für historische Musikpraxis. 10: 13–62.
- Arlt, Wulf (1975). "Peripherie und Zentrum vier Studien zur ein- und mehrstimmigen Musik des hohen Mittelalters". Forum Musicologicum — Basler Studien zur Musikgeschichte. 1: 169–222.
- Boynton, Susan (2006). Shaping a Monastic Identity: Liturgy & History at the Imperial Abbey of Farfa, 1000-1125. Ithaca: Cornell UP. ISBN 978-0801443817.
- Carlson, Rachel G. (2003). "Striking Ornaments: Complexities of Sense and Song in Aquitanian 'Versus'". Music & Letters. 84 (4): 527–556. JSTOR 3525921.
- Chailley, Jacques (1960). L'École musicale de Saint-Martial de Limoges jusqu'à la fin du XIe siècle. Paris: Les livres essentiels.
- Crocker, Richard L. (2001). "Versus (Lat.)". Grove Music Online. doi:10.1093/gmo/9781561592630.article.29247.
- Crocker, Richard L. (1994). "Two Recent Editions of Aquitanian Polyphony". Plainsong and Medieval Music. 3 (1): 57–101. doi:10.1017/S0961137100000632.
- Crocker, Richard L. (1957). The Repertoire of Proses at Saint Martial de Limoges (Tenth and Eleventh Centuries) (PhD thesis). New Haven, Connecticut: Yale University.
- Danckwardt, Marianne (1999). "Das 'Stirps iesse' der Handschrift Paris, Bibliothèque nationale, fonds latin 3549 und sein Verhältnis zum Saint-Martial- und Notre-Dame-Repertoire". In Bernd Edelmann; Sabine Kurth (eds.). Compositionswissenschaft: Festschrift Reinhold und Roswitha Schlötterer zum 70. Geburtstag. Augsburg: Wissner. pp. 11–30.
- Danckwardt, Marianne (1984). "Zur Notierung, klanglichen Anlage und Rhythmisierung der Mehrstimmigkeit in den Saint-Martial-Handschriften". Kirchenmusikalisches Jahrbuch. 68: 31–88.
- Fassler, Margot (2000). "Mary's Nativity, Fulbert of Chartres, and the Stirps Jesse: Liturgical Innovation circa 1000 and Its Afterlife". Speculum. 75 (2): 389–434. doi:10.2307/2887583. JSTOR 2887583.
- Fuller, Sarah (1990). "Early Polyphony". In Richard L. Crocker; David Hiley (eds.). The Early Middle Ages to 1300. New Oxford History of Music. Vol. 2. Oxford: Oxford UP. pp. 485–556. ISBN 978-0193163294.
- Fuller, Sarah (1979). "The Myth of 'Saint Martial' Polyphony – A Study of the Sources". Musica Disciplina. 33: 5–26. JSTOR 20532213.
- Fuller, Sarah Ann (1977). "An Anonymous Treatise 'Dictus de Sancto Martiale': A New Source for Cistercian Music Theory". Musica disciplina. 31: 5–30. JSTOR 20532193.
- Fuller, Sarah Ann (1971). "Hidden Polyphony—A Reappraisal". Journal of the American Musicological Society. 24 (2): 169–192. doi:10.2307/830490. JSTOR 830490.
- Fuller, Sarah Ann (1969). Aquitanian polyphony of the eleventh and twelfth centuries (PhD thesis). Vol. 1–3. Berkeley: University of California.
- Gillingham, Bryan (2006). Music in the Cluniac Ecclesia: A Pilot Project. Ottawa: Institute of Mediaeval Music. ISBN 978-1896926735.
- Grier, James (1990). "Some Codicological Observations on the Aquitanian Versaria". Musica Disciplina. 44: 5–56. JSTOR 20532337.
- Grier, James (1994). "A New Voice in the Monastery: Tropes and Versus from Eleventh- and Twelfth-Century Aquitaine". Speculum. 69 (4): 1023–1069. doi:10.2307/2865604. JSTOR 2865604.
- Grier, James (1995). "Roger de Chabannes (d. 1025), Cantor of St Martial, Limoges". Early Music History. 14: 53–119. doi:10.1017/s0261127900001443. JSTOR 853930. S2CID 193229234.
- Grier, James (2003). "The Music is the Message: Music in the Apostolic Liturgy of Saint Martial". Plainsong and Medieval Music. 12 (1): 1–14. doi:10.1017/S0961137103003012. S2CID 162554319.
- Grier, James (2005). "The Musical Autographs of Adémar de Chabannes (989–1034)". Early Music History. 24: 125–168. doi:10.1017/S0261127905000100. S2CID 194078301.
- Grier, James (2006a). "The Music is the Message II: Adémar de Chabannes' Music for the Apostolic Office of Saint Martial". Plainsong and Medieval Music. 15 (1): 43–54. doi:10.1017/S0961137106000246. S2CID 162870563.
- Grier, James (2006). The Musical World of a Medieval Monk: Adémar de Chabannes in eleventh-century Aquitaine. Cambridge, New York, Melbourne, Madrid, Cape Town, Singapore, São Paulo: Cambridge UP. ISBN 9780521856287.
- Grier, James (2013). "Adémar de Chabannes (989–1034) and musical literacy". Journal of the American Musicological Society. 66 (3): 605–638. doi:10.1525/jams.2013.66.3.605.
- Gushee, Marion S (1964). Romanesque Polyphony — A Study of the Fragmentary Sources (PhD thesis). New Haven, Connecticut: Yale University.
- Hankeln, Roman (1999). Die Offertoriumsprosuln der aquitanischen Handschriften: Voruntersuchungen zur Edition des aquitanischen Offertoriumscorpus und seiner Erweiterungen. Regensburger Studien zur Musikgeschichte. Tutzing: Schneider. ISBN 978-3-7952-0973-5.
- Herzo, Anthony Marie (1966). Five Aquitanian graduals, their mass propers and Alleluia cycles (PhD thesis). Los Angeles: University of Southern California.
- Huglo, Michel (1955). "Les Preces des Graduels aquitains empruntées à la liturgie hispanique". Hispania Sacra. 8: 361–383.
- Huglo, Michel (1982a). "La tradition musicale aquitaine. Répertoire et notation". Liturgie et Musique (IXe-XIVe S.). Cahiers de Fanjeaux. 17: 253–268.
- Huglo, Michel (1982b). "Les débuts de la polyphonie à Paris : les premiers organa parisiens". Forum Musicologicum — Basler Studien zur Musikgeschichte. 3: 94–163. (English translation by Rob C. Wegman).
- Iogna-Prat, Dominique (2002). Order & exclusion: Cluny and Christendom face heresy, Judaism, and Islam 1000-1150 [Original: Ordonner et exclure. Cluny et la société chrétienne face à l'hérésie, au Judaisme et à l'Islam, 1000-1150 © 1998]. Conjunctions of religion & power in the medieval past. Graham Robert Edwards (transl.). Ithaca, N.Y.: Cornell UP. ISBN 978-0-8014-3708-3.
- Kaden, Christian (1985). "Notation - frühe Mehrstimmigkeit - Komposition". Musiksoziologie. Wilhelmshaven: Heinrichshofen. pp. 334–447. ISBN 978-3795904463.
- Karp, Theodore (1967). "St. Martial and Santiago de Compostela: An Analytical Speculation". Acta Musicologica. 39 (3/4): 144–160. doi:10.2307/932350. JSTOR 932350.
- Ludwig, Friedrich (1924). "Die geistliche nichtliturgische, weltliche einstimmige und die mehrstimmige Musik des Mittelalters bis zum Anfang des 15. Jahrhunderts". In Guido Adler (ed.). Handbuch der Musikgeschichte. Vol. 1. Frankfurt am Main: Frankfurter Verlagsanstalt. pp. 127–250.
- Marshall, Judith M. (1962). "Hidden Polyphony in a Manuscript from St. Martial de Limoges". Journal of the American Musicological Society. 15 (2): 131–144. doi:10.2307/829638. JSTOR 829638.
- Marshall, Judith M. (1961). A Late Eleventh-Century Manuscript from St. Martial de Limoges: Paris, Bibliothèque Nationale, fonds latin no. 1139 (PhD thesis). New Haven, Connecticut: Yale University.
- O'Sullivan, Daniel E. (2013). "Na Maria: Shaping Marian Devotion in Old Occitan Song". In Daniel E. O'Sullivan, Laurie Shepard (ed.). Shaping Courtliness in Medieval France: Essays in Honor of Matilda Tomaryn Bruckner. Gallica. Vol. 28. Cambridge, Mass.: D. S. Brewer. pp. 183–200. ISBN 978-1-84384-335-1. JSTOR 10.7722/j.ctt24hfpt.17.
- Planchart, Alejandro Enrique; Fuller, Sarah (2001). "St Martial". Grove Music Online. Oxford: Oxford University Press. doi:10.1093/gmo/9781561592630.article.40296. (subscription, Wikilibrary access, or UK public library membership required)
- Rankin, Susan; Hiley, David, eds. (1993). Music in the Medieval English Liturgy. Plainsong & Mediaeval Music Society Centennial Essays. Oxford: Clarendon Press. ISBN 978-0193161252.
- Sherrill, William Manning (2011). The Gradual of St. Yrieix in eleventh-century Aquitaine (PhD thesis). Austin: University of Texas. hdl:2152/ETD-UT-2011-05-2991.
- Spanke, Hans (1931a). "St. Martial-Studien – Ein Beitrag zur frühromanischen Metrik". Zeitschrift für französische Sprache und Literatur. 54 (5/6): 282–317. JSTOR 40615184.
- Spanke, Hans (1931b). "St. Martial-Studien. Ein Beitrag zur frühromanischen Metrik (Fortsetzung)". Zeitschrift für französische Sprache und Literatur. 54 (7/8): 385–422. JSTOR 40615197.
- Spanke, Hans (1932). "St. Martialstudien II". Zeitschrift für französische Sprache und Literatur. 56 (7/8): 450–478. JSTOR 40615328.
- Treitler, Leo (2003). With Voice and Pen — Coming to know Medieval Song and How it was made. Oxford, New York: Oxford UP. ISBN 9780198166443.
- Treitler, Leo (1967). The Aquitanian repertories of sacred monody in the eleventh and twelfth centuries (PhD thesis). Vol. 1–3. Princeton, N.J: Princeton University.
- Treitler, Leo (1964). "The Polyphony of St. Martial". Journal of the American Musicological Society. 17 (1): 29–42. doi:10.2307/830028. JSTOR 830028.
- Varelli, Giovanni (2013). "Two Newly Discovered 10th-Century Organa". Early Music History. 32: 277–315. doi:10.1017/S0261127913000053. S2CID 191495159.
