= Friedrich Ludwig =

Friedrich Ludwig may refer to:

- Friedrich Ludwig (botanist) (1851–1918), German botanist
- Friedrich Ludwig (painter) (1895–1970), German expressionist painter
- Friedrich Ludwig (musicologist) (1872–1930), German historian, musicologist, and college instructor
- Friedrich Ludwig, Prince of Hohenzollern-Hechingen (1688–1750)
