= Michel Huglo =

French musicologist (1921–2012)

Michel Huglo (14 December 1921 – 13 May 2012) was a French musicologist who specialized in medieval music. Much of his research was devoted to Gregorian chant and plainsong, generally.

== Life and career ==
Michel Victor René Marie Joseph Huglo was born in Lille, France on 14 December 1921. He was a monk of Solesmes Abbey from 1941 to 1960 where he studied philosophy and theology. He worked on the series of early medieval chant manuscript facsimiles, Paléograpie musicale from 1949 to 1960, after which he moved to the French National Centre for Scientific Research (CNRS) where he was eventually director of research (directeur de recherche). He was the founder and director of the department of musicology of the Institut de recherche et d'histoire des textes from 1973 to his retirement in 1986.

He worked across many areas of plainsong research, including modal organization in tonaries and creating the first catalog of processionals. He received an honorary doctorate from the University of Chicago in 1991, was a corresponding (now honorary) member of the American Musicological Society in 1997, an honorary member of the International Musicological Society in 2007, and a fellow of the Medieval Academy of America in 2008.

== Personal life ==
After retirement, Huglo moved to the United States. He married musicologist Barbara Haggh (now Haggh-Huglo). Huglo died in Washington, D.C. in 2012.

== Publications ==
The following lists the most important publications. A complete list to 2017 is listed in the Grove 2020 article (with a few still listed as in press).

=== Books ===
- Les Tonaires: Inventaire, analyse, comparaison. Paris: Société française de musicology, 1971.
- Les manuscrits du Processional RISM B XIV 1–2. Munich: Bärenreiter 1999 and 2004.

=== Articles ===
- "Notice descriptive sur le Ms. VI. 34 de Bénévent," Paléographie musicale XV (1953)
- "Le Chant 'vieux-roman': mss et témoins indirects," Sacris Erudiri VI (1964)
- "Les Noms des neumes et leur origine" Études grégoriennes I (1954)
- "La Chironomie médiévale" in Revue de musicologie 49 (1963)
- "La Musicologie au XVIIIe siècle: G. Martini et M. Gerbert," Revue de musicologie LXIX (1973)
- "The Earliest Developments in Square Notation: Twelfth-century Aquitaine," in The Calligraphy of Medieval Music, ed. J. Haines (Turnhout: Brepols, 2011), pp. 163–71.
- with Barbara Haggh and Leofranc Holford-Strevens: "The Topography of Music Theory in Paris, 900–1450," in City, Chant, and the Topography of Early Music: in Honor of Thomas Forrest Kelly ed. Michael Scott Cuthbert, Sean Gallagher, and Christoph Wolff (Cambridge, Mass.: Harvard Music Department: 2013), pp. 275–334.
