= James Grier (musicologist) =

Canadian-American musicologist (born 1952)

- Born: 27 October 1952 (age 73); Toronto, Ontario, Canada

Academic background
- Education: University of Toronto

Academic work
- Discipline: Musicology
- Institutions: University of Western Ontario

James Norman Grier (born 27 October 1952) is a Canadian-American musicologist who is professor of Music History at University of Western Ontario. He was awarded a Guggenheim Fellowship in 2020. In 2009 he received a Killam Research Fellowship. He discovered 11th-century monk Adémar de Chabannes as one of the first to place musical notes higher or lower according to their pitch, a principle of musical notation still in use today.
