= High Middle Ages =

Period of European history between AD 1000 and 1300

High Middle Ages
Europe and Mediterranean region

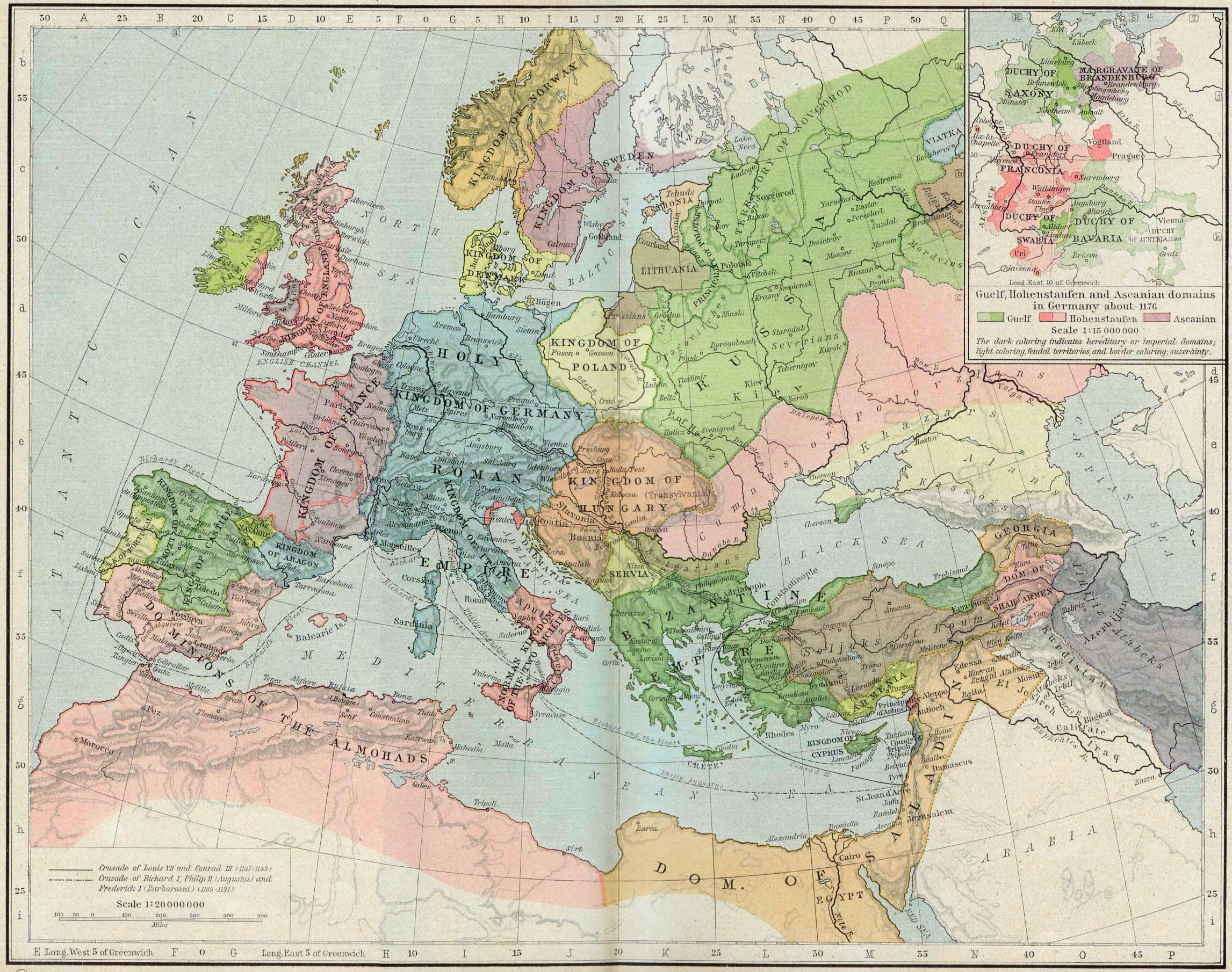
Large map
Europe and the Mediterranean region, c. 1190

British Isles

- Gaelic Kingdoms
- Principality of Wales
- Kingdom of England
- Kingdom of Scotland
- Earldom of Orkney (Norway)
- Kingdom of Mann and the Isles (Norway)

Northern Europe

- Kingdom of Norway
- Kingdom of Sweden
- Kingdom of Denmark
- Terra Mariana
- Grand Duchy of Lithuania

Eastern Europe

- Principalities of Polotsk
- Territory of Novgorod
- Kama-Bulgarians
- Kievan Rus'
- Viatka
- Cumans/Cumania or Polovtsians

Iberian Peninsula

- Kingdom of Portugal
- Kingdom of León
- Kingdom of Castile
- Kingdom of Navarre
- Crown of Aragon

Central Europe

- Kingdom of Bohemia
- Kingdom of France
- Kingdom of Germany
- Kingdom of Hungary
- Holy Roman Empire
- Kingdom of Poland
- Prussia

Italian Peninsula

- Kingdom of Italy
- Corsica
- Sardinia
- Kingdom of Sicily
- Republic of Venice

Southeast Europe

- Kingdom of Croatia
- Kingdom of Serbia
- Second Bulgarian Empire
- Byzantine Empire

Caucasia

- Khazar Empire
- Alania
- Kassogs
- Kingdom of Georgia
- Atabegs of Azerbaijan
- Armenian Kingdom of Cilicia

Near East

- Seljuks of Rum
- Kingdom of Cyprus
- Dominion of Shaharmen
- Marwanid dynasty
- Ayyubid dynasty
- Principality of Antioch
- County of Tripoli

North Africa

- Almohad Caliphate

The Crusades

- (Solid Line) Second Crusade of Louis VII and Conrad III
- (Line and dot) Third Crusade of Richard I, Philip II, and Fredrick I

Small map

Central Europe
Welf, Hohenstaufen, and Ascanian domains in Germany about 1176

- Duchy of Saxony
- Margravate of Brandenburg
- Duchy of Franconia
- Duchy of Swabia
- Duchy of Bavaria

The High Middle Ages, or High Medieval Period, was the period of European history between c. 1000 and c. 1300; it was preceded by the Early Middle Ages and followed by the Late Middle Ages, which ended c. 1500 according to historiographical convention. Key historical trends of the High Middle Ages include the ascent of the great Italian city-states, the rapidly increasing population of Europe, which brought about great social and political change from the preceding era, and the Renaissance of the 12th century, including the first developments of the rural exodus and urbanization. By 1350, the robust population increase had greatly benefited the European economy, which had reached levels that would not be seen again in some areas until the 19th century. That trend faltered in the early 14th century, as the result of numerous events which together comprised the crisis of the late Middle Ages—most notable among them being the Black Death, in addition to various regional wars and economic stagnation.

The Vikings settled in the British Isles, France and elsewhere, and Norse Christian kingdoms started developing in their Scandinavian homelands. The Magyars ceased their expansion in the 10th century, and by 1000, a Christian Kingdom of Hungary had become a recognized state in Central Europe that was forming alliances with regional powers. With the brief exception of the Mongol invasions in the 13th century, major nomadic incursions ceased. The powerful Byzantine Empire of the Macedonian and Komnenos dynasties gradually gave way to the resurrected Serbia and Bulgaria and to a successor crusader state (1204 to 1261), who continually fought each other until the end of the Latin Empire. The Byzantine Empire was reestablished in 1261 with the recapture of Constantinople from the Latins, though it was no longer a major power and would continue to falter through the 14th century, with remnants lasting until the mid 15th century.

In the 11th century, populations north of the Alps began a more intensive settlement, targeting "new" lands, some areas of which had reverted to wilderness after the end of the Western Roman Empire. In what historian Charles Higounet called the "great clearances", Europeans cleared and cultivated some of the vast forests and marshes that lay across much of the continent. At the same time, settlers moved beyond the traditional boundaries of the Frankish Empire to new frontiers beyond the Elbe River, which tripled the size of Germany in the process. The Catholic Church, which reached the peak of its political power around then, called armies from across Europe to a series of Crusades against the Seljuk Turks. The crusaders occupied the Holy Land and founded the Crusader States in the Levant. Other wars led to the Northern Crusades. The Islamic civilization of Al-Andalus flourished until Christian kingdoms took much of the Iberian Peninsula from Muslim control. The Normans conquered southern Italy, all part of the major population increases and the resettlement patterns of the era.

The High Middle Ages produced many different forms of intellectual, spiritual and artistic works, including many of the most notable Gothic cathedrals. The first universities, in Bologna, Oxford, Paris, Salamanca, Cambridge and Modena, facilitated an encounter with medieval Jewish and Islamic philosophy and the rediscovery of the works of Aristotle. Maimonides, Ibn Sina, Ibn Rushd, Thomas Aquinas and other thinkers of the period developed Scholasticism, a combination of Judeo-Islamic and Catholic ideologies with the ancient philosophy. Byzantine art reached a peak in the 12th century.

== Historical events and politics ==
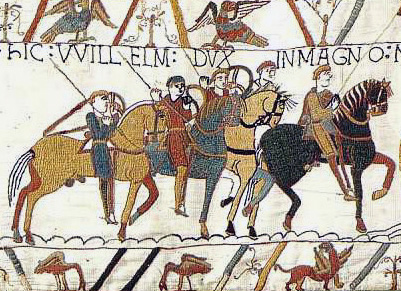
The Bayeux Tapestry depicting the Battle of Hastings during the Norman Conquest of 1066

=== Great Britain and Ireland ===
In England, the Norman Conquest of 1066 resulted in a kingdom ruled by a Francophone nobility. The Normans invaded Ireland in 1169 and soon established themselves in most of the country, although their stronghold was the southeast. Likewise, Scotland and Wales were subdued into vassal states at about the same time, though Scotland later asserted its independence and Wales remained largely under the rule of independent native princes until the death of Llywelyn ap Gruffydd in 1282. The Exchequer was founded in the 12th century under King Henry I, and the first parliaments were convened. In 1215, after the loss of Normandy, King John signed the Magna Carta into law, limiting the power of English monarchs.

=== Iberia ===
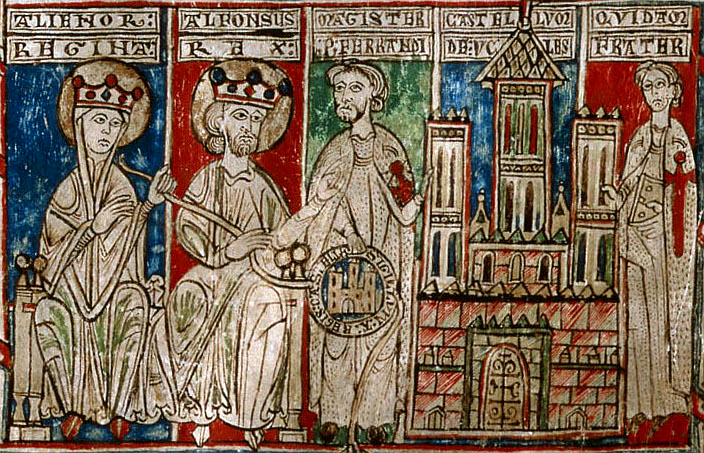
Miniature representing the delivery of the fortress of Uclés to the Master of Order of Santiago in 1174

A key geo-strategic development in the Iberian Peninsula was the Christian conquest of Toledo in 1085. Dominated by war, the societal structures and relations in the northern Christian kingdoms were subordinated to the demands of omnipresent military conflict. The territorial expansion of the northern Christian kingdoms to the south brought the creation of border societies, where military demands on knights and foot soldiers and the promotion of settlement were prioritized over potential seigneurial income; military orders also played an important role in the borderlands in the southern meseta. Agricultural models in areas with Mediterranean climate were generally based on biennial crop rotation. Despite population growth, agricultural output remained relatively rigid throughout the period; between the 10th and 13th centuries, migration southwards to exposed areas was incentivized by the possibility of enjoying privileges and acquiring properties. Conversely, the intensive agriculture-prevalent model in Muslim-ruled lands did not require territorial expansion. While Muslim lands enjoyed a certain demographic and financial edge, Almoravids and Almohads from northern Africa featured volatile state structures; barring (unsuccessful) attempts to take Toledo, they did not stand out for carrying out an expansionist policy.

=== Italy ===
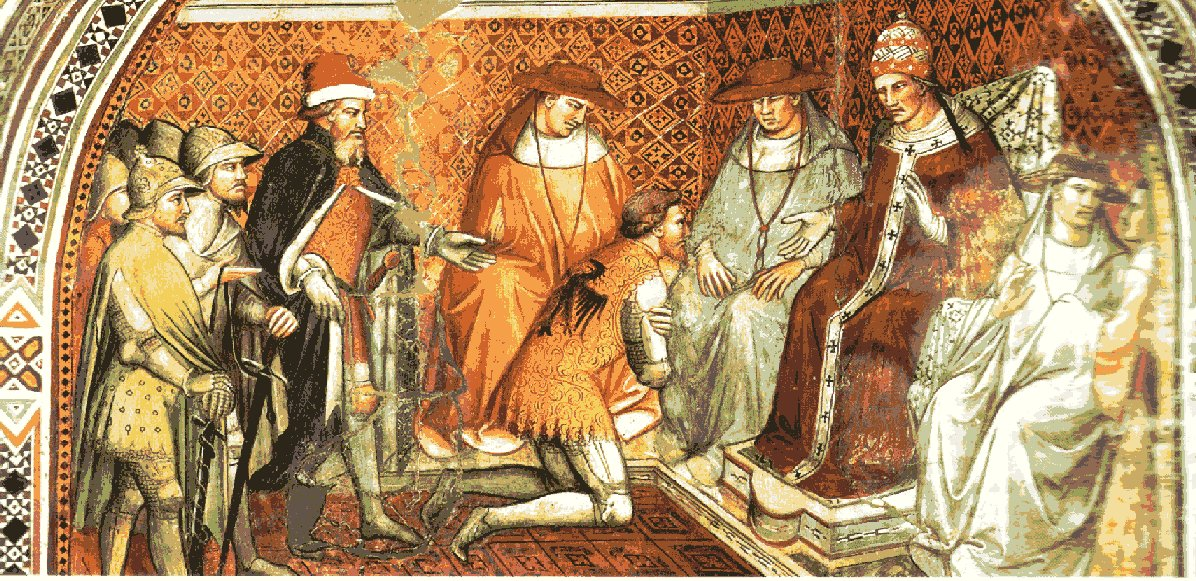
Holy Roman Emperor Frederick Barbarossa kneels before Pope Alexander III before signing the Treaty of Venice (1177), fresco in Palazzo Pubblico, Siena.

Along with the existing Republic of Venice, new Italian city-state maritime republics like Genoa and Pisa (from c. 1000), and Florence (from 1115), thrived on expanding trade, led a commercial revolution, and made Italy the most productive region of Europe in the Middle Ages. Pope Alexander III (r. 1159–1181) strongly backed the 1167 alliance of these northern Italian cities, which defeated the Holy Roman Empire at the Battle of Legnano (1176) and won their effective independence from the Empire in the Peace of Constance (1183). In 1256, Bologna’s Liber Paradisus purchased the freedom of nearly 6,000 serfs, the first abolition of serfdom in Europe.

In 1130, Norman conquests in southern Italy, including the island of Sicily and the southern third of the Italian Peninsula (including Benevento), were united as the Kingdom of Sicily. Subsequently joined to the Holy Roman Empire, it had its moment of maximum splendor with the emperor Frederick II.

=== Scandinavia ===
From the mid-10th to the mid-11th centuries, the Scandinavian kingdoms were unified and Christianized, resulting in an end of Viking raids, and greater involvement in European politics. King Cnut of Denmark ruled over both England and Norway. After Cnut's death in 1035, England and Norway were both lost, and with the defeat of Valdemar II in 1227, Danish predominance in the region came to an end. Meanwhile, Norway extended its Atlantic possessions, ranging from Greenland to the Isle of Man, while Sweden, under Birger Jarl, built up a power-base in the Baltic Sea. However, the Norwegian influence started to decline already in the same period, marked by the Treaty of Perth of 1266. Also, civil wars raged in Norway between 1130 and 1240.

=== France and Germany ===
France and Germany in the middle ages
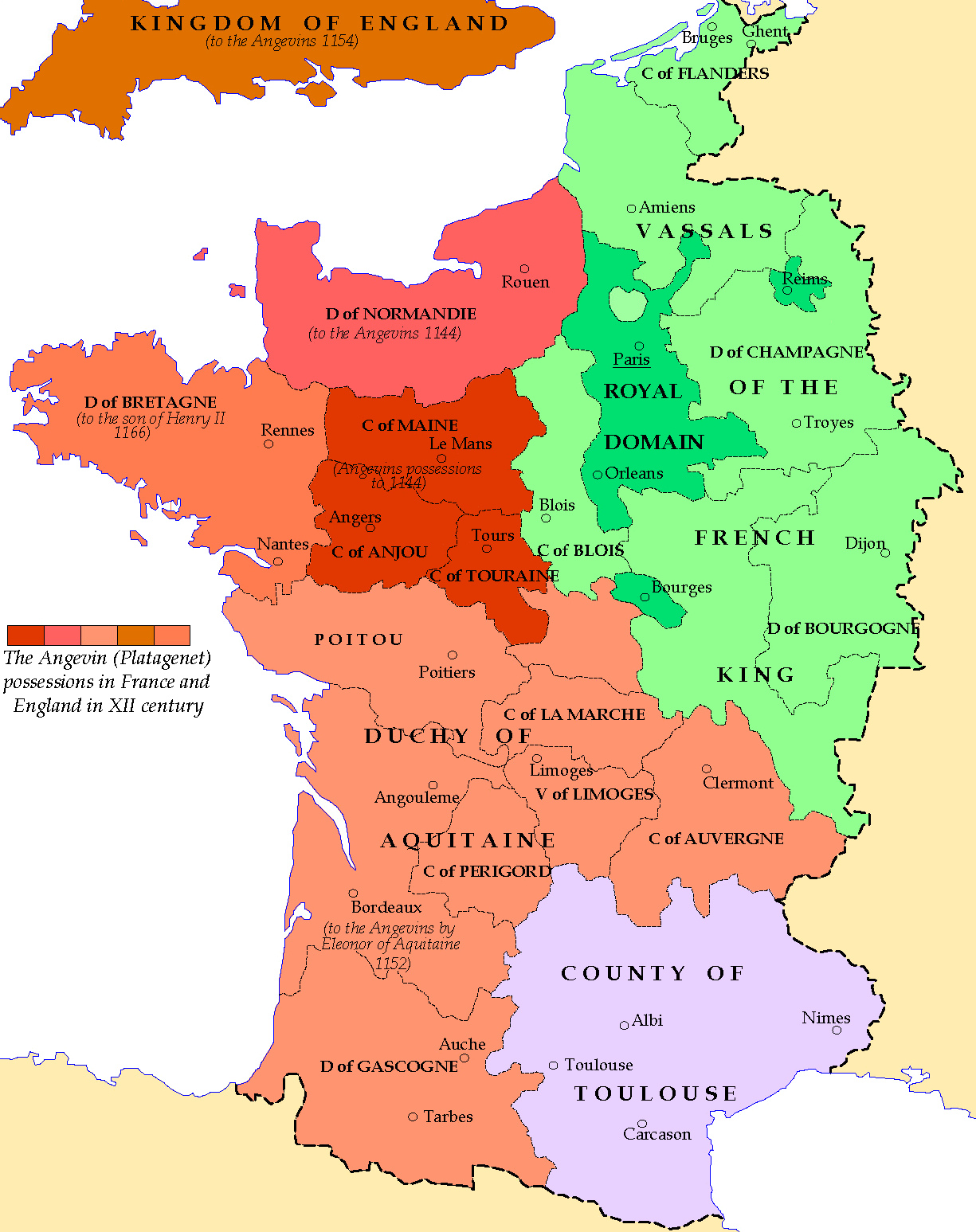
Left: France in the 12th century. Right: The Holy Roman Empire between 1200 and 1250

By the time of the High Middle Ages, the Carolingian Empire had been divided and replaced by separate successor kingdoms called France and Germany, although not with their modern boundaries. France pushed to the west. The Angevin Empire controlled much of France in the 12th century and early 13th century until the French retook much of their previous territory.

=== Germany ===
By the time of the High Middle Ages, the Carolingian Empire had been divided and replaced by separate successor kingdoms called France and Germany, although not with their modern boundaries. Germany was significantly more eastern. Germany was under the banner of the Holy Roman Empire, which reached its high-water mark of unity and political power under Kaiser Frederick Barbarossa.

=== Georgia ===
During the successful reign of King David IV of Georgia (1089–1125), the Kingdom of Georgia grew in strength and expelled the Seljuk Empire from its lands. David's decisive victory in the Battle of Didgori (1121) against the Seljuk Turks, as a result of which Georgia recaptured its lost capital Tbilisi, marked the beginning of the Georgian Golden Age. David's granddaughter Queen Tamar continued the upward rise, successfully neutralizing internal opposition and embarking on an energetic foreign policy aided by further decline of the hostile Seljuk Turks. Relying on a powerful military elite, Tamar was able to build on the successes of her predecessors to consolidate an empire which dominated vast lands spanning from present-day southern Russia on the Black Sea to the Caspian Sea. Georgia remained a leading regional power until its collapse under the Mongol attacks within two decades after Tamar's death.

=== Hungary ===
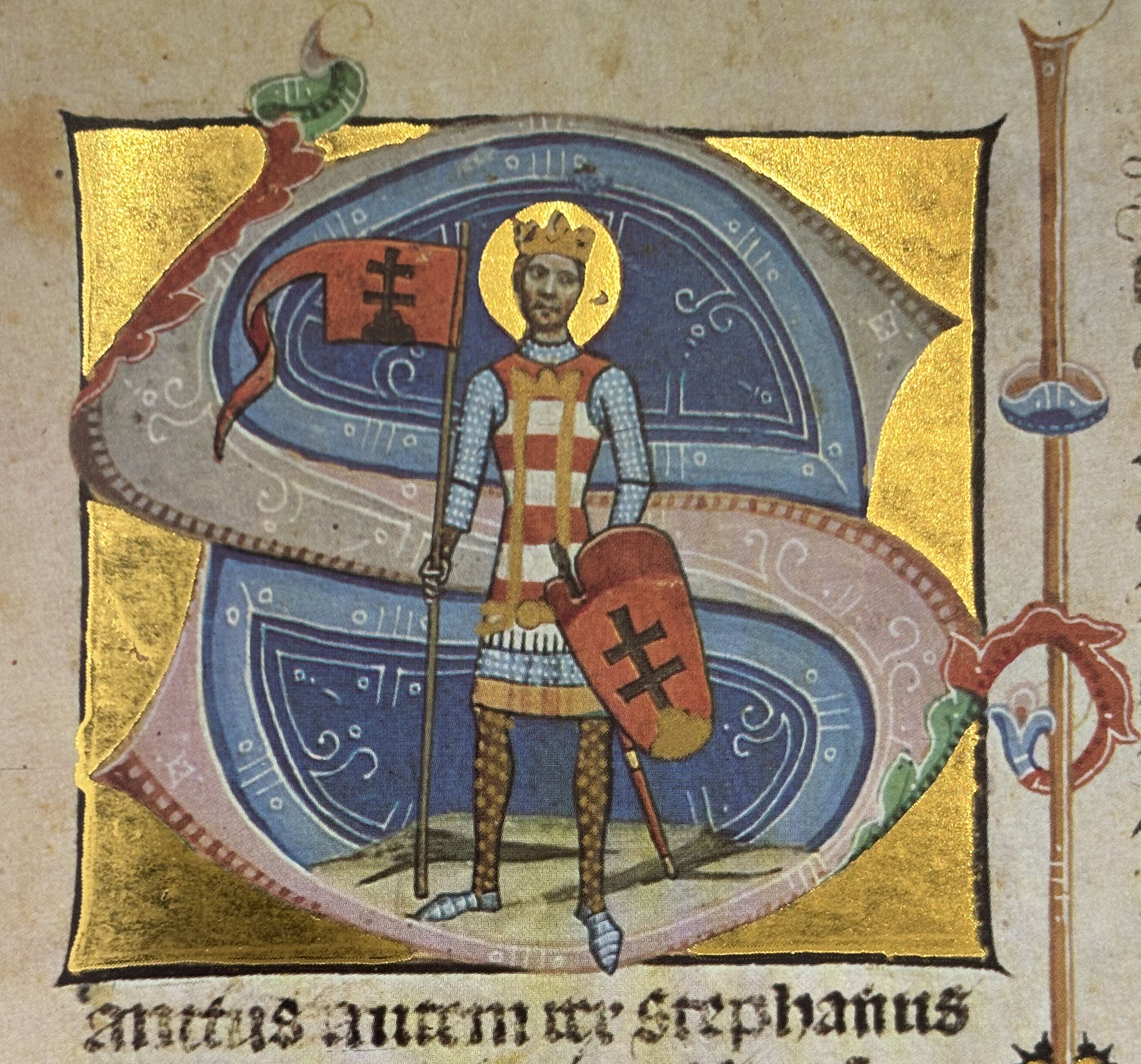
King Saint Stephen I of Hungary (Chronicon Pictum)

In the High Middle Ages, Hungary became one of the most powerful medieval states in Europe. The Christian Kingdom of Hungary was established in 1000 under King Saint Stephen I of Hungary, and ruled by the Árpád dynasty for the following centuries. King Saint Ladislaus completed the work of King Saint Stephen. He consolidated the Hungarian state power and strengthened the influence of Christianity. His charismatic personality, strategic leadership and military talents resulted the termination of internal power struggles and foreign military threats. The Kingdom of Hungary expanded to the Adriatic coast and entered a personal union with Croatia in 1102, by establish other vassal states, Hungary became a small empire that extended its control over the Southeast Europe and the Carpathian region. The Hungarian royal Árpád dynasty gave the world the most saints and blessed from a single family.

=== Lithuania ===
During the High Middle Ages Lithuania emerged as a Duchy of Lithuania in the early 13th century, then briefly becoming the Kingdom of Lithuania from 1251 to 1263. After the assassination of its first Christian king Mindaugas Lithuania was known as Grand Duchy of Lithuania. Unconquered during the Lithuanian Crusade, Lithuania itself rapidly expanded to the East due to conquests and became one of the largest states in Europe.

=== Poland ===
Poland under the rule of Duke Mieszko I between c. 960 - 992

In the mid-10th century Poland emerged as a duchy after Mieszko I, the ruler of the Polans, conquered the surrounding Lechitic tribes in the region. Then in 1025 under the rule of Bolesław I the Brave, Poland became a kingdom.

=== Southeast Europe ===
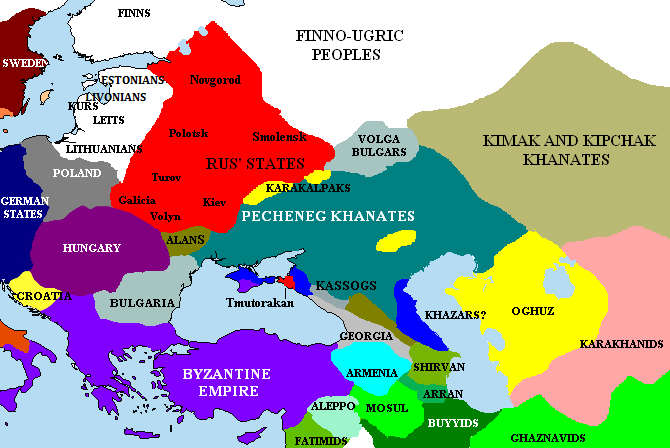
The Pontic steppes, c. 1015

The High Middle Ages saw the height and decline of the Slavic state of Kievan Rus' and emergence of Cumania. Later, the Mongol invasion in the 13th century had a great impact on the east of Europe, as many countries of the region were invaded, pillaged, conquered or vassalized.

During the first half of this period (c. 1025—1185), the Byzantine Empire dominated Southeast Europe, and under the Komnenian emperors there was a revival of prosperity and urbanization; however, their domination of Southeast Europe was coming to an end with a successful Vlach-Bulgarian rebellion in 1185, and henceforth the region was divided between the Byzantines in Greece, some parts of Macedonia, and Thrace, the Bulgarians in Moesia and most of Thrace and Macedonia, and the Serbs to the northwest. Eastern and Western churches had formally split in the 11th century, and despite occasional periods of co-operation during the 12th century, in 1204 the Fourth Crusade treacherously captured Constantinople. This severely damaged the Byzantines, and their power was ultimately weakened by the Seljuks and the rising Ottoman Empire in the 14–15th century. The power of the Latin Empire, however, was short-lived after the Crusader army was routed by Bulgarian Emperor Kaloyan in the Battle of Adrianople (1205).

=== Climate and agriculture ===
The Medieval Warm Period, the period from the 10th century to about the 14th century in Europe, was a relatively warm and gentle interval ended by the generally colder Little Ice Age which would continue until the middle of the 19th century. Farmers grew wheat well north into Scandinavia, and wine grapes in northern England, although the maximum expansion of vineyards appeared to occur within the Little Ice Age period. During this time, a high demand for wine and steady volume of alcohol consumption inspired a viticulture revolution of progress. The relative protection from famine during this time allowed Europe's population to increase, despite the famine in 1315 that killed 1.5 million people. This increased population contributed to the founding of new towns and an increase in industrial and economic activity during the period. They also established trade and a comprehensive production of alcohol. Food production also increased during this time as new ways of farming were introduced, including the use of a heavier plow, horses instead of oxen, and a three-field system that allowed the cultivation of a greater variety of crops than the earlier two-field system—notably legumes, the growth of which prevented the depletion of important nitrogen from the soil.

=== The rise of chivalry ===
During the High Middle Ages, the idea of a Christian warrior started to change as Christianity grew more prominent in medieval Europe. The Codes of Chivalry promoted the ideal knight to be selfless, faithful, and fierce against those who threaten the weak. Household heavy cavalry (knights) became common in the 11th century across Europe, and tournaments were invented. Tournaments allowed knights to establish their family name while being able to gather vast wealth and renown through victories. In the 12th century, the Cluny monks promoted ethical warfare and inspired the formation of orders of chivalry, such as the Templar Knights. Inherited titles of nobility were established during this period. In 13th-century Germany, knighthood became another inheritable title, although one of the less prestigious, and the trend spread to other countries.

== Religion ==
=== Christian Church ===
The second half of the 11th century saw a rapid and radical transformation in the character of the Rome-based Latin Church. In 1046 the Holy Roman Emperor Henry III (r. 1046–1056) deposed Pope Gregory VI (r. 1045–1046) — who had purchased the papacy — along with two other claimants, beginning the process of freeing the papacy from the control of the local Roman nobility. Pope Leo IX (r. 1049–1054), a German, recruited an international circle of radical reformers who helped him create an "itinerant papacy" that moved from city to city to hold church councils, consecrate cathedrals, and negotiate with secular rulers. After centuries of growing rivalry, Leo's dynamic papacy also precipitated the East–West Schism (also "Great Schism") that split the Latin Church from the Eastern Orthodox Church of the Byzantine Empire in 1054. One of Leo's reformist successors, Pope Nicholas II (r. 1059–1061), and his influential advisor Cardinal Hildebrand of Sovana, issued the papal bull In nomine Domini (1059), which stripped the Holy Roman Emperor of his traditional role in appointing popes and established the College of Cardinals as the sole electors. After Cardinal Hildebrand was himself elected Pope Gregory VII (r. 1073–1085), he worked both to improve the moral integrity and independence of Church clergy (including making celibacy mandatory) and to establish the total freedom of the Church from secular interference ("libertas ecclesiae"). By challenging the Holy Roman Emperor Henry IV's (r. 1084–1105) right to appoint church officials, Gregory began the Investiture Controversy, a struggle for supremacy between the Church and the secular monarchies of Europe.

=== Crusades ===
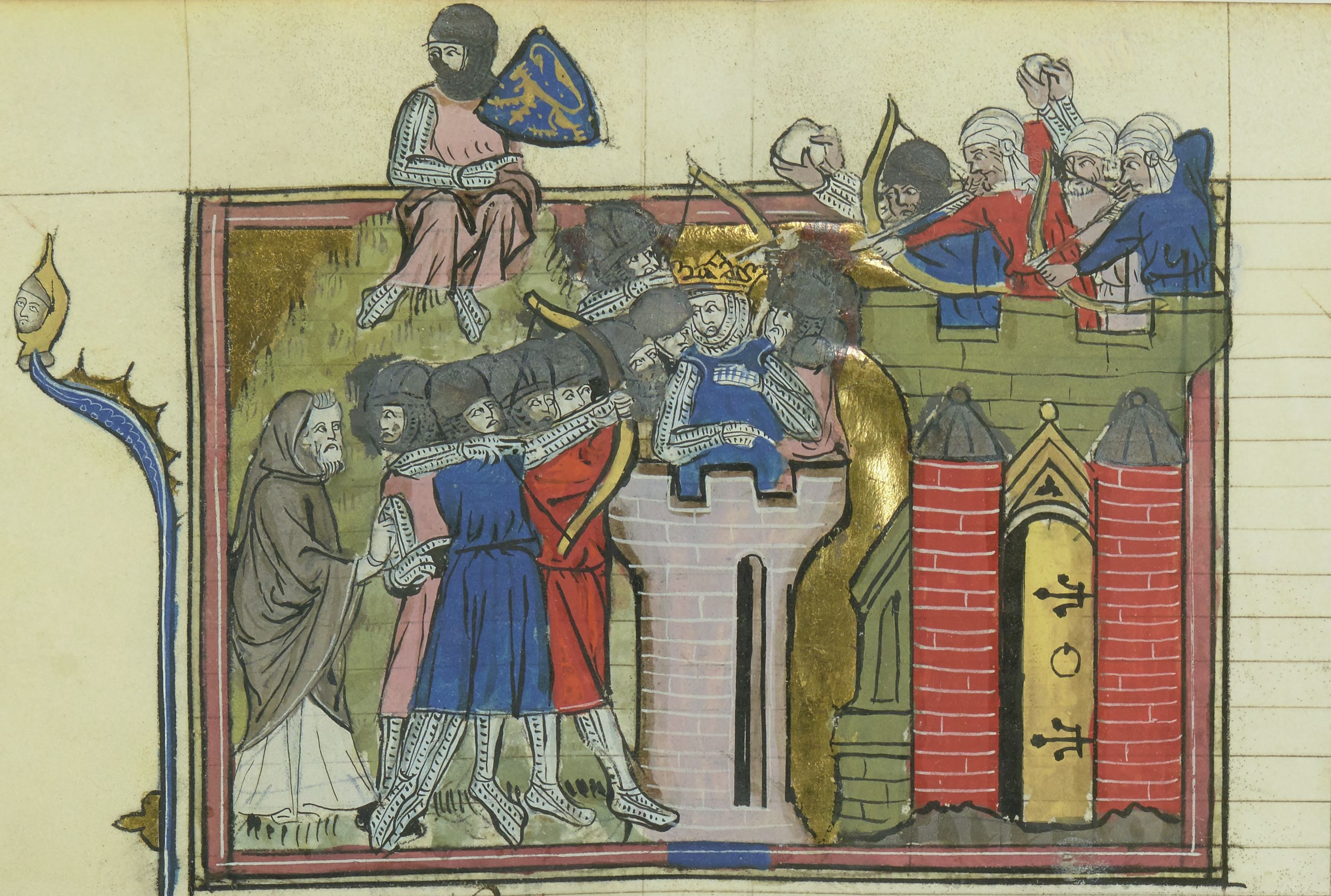
After the successful siege of Jerusalem in 1099, Godfrey of Bouillon, leader of the First Crusade, became the first ruler of the Kingdom of Jerusalem.

In 1095 the Byzantine emperor Alexios I Komnenos requested military support in his Empire's conflict with the Seljuk Empire. In response, Pope Urban II (r. 1088-1099) spread a message of holy war across Europe. The ensuing Crusades led to the foundation of small Catholic states in the Levant, which lasted for two centuries until their final outpost, Acre, fell to the Mamluk Sultanate in 1291.

==== Military orders ====
In the context of the crusades, monastic military orders were founded that would become the template for the late medieval chivalric orders.

The Knights Templar were a Christian military order founded after the First Crusade to help protect Christian pilgrims from hostile locals and highway bandits. The order was deeply involved in banking, and in 1307 Philip the Fair (Philippine le Bel) had the entire order arrested in France and dismantled on charges of alleged heresy.

The Knights Hospitaller were originally a Christian organization founded in Jerusalem in 1080 to provide care for poor, sick, or injured pilgrims to the Holy Land. After Jerusalem was taken in the First Crusade, it became a religious/military order that was charged with the care and defence of the Crusader states. After the Holy Lands were eventually taken by Muslim forces, it moved its operations to Rhodes, and later Malta.

The Teutonic Knights were a German religious order formed in 1190, in the city of Acre, to aid Christian pilgrims on their way to the Holy Lands and to operate hospitals for the sick and injured in Outremer. After Muslim forces captured the Holy Lands, the order moved to Transylvania in 1211 and later, after being expelled, invaded pagan Prussia with the intention of Christianizing the Baltic region. Yet, both before and after the Order's main pagan opponent, Lithuania, converted to Christianity, the Order had already attacked other Christian nations such as Novgorod and Poland. The Teutonic Knights' power hold, which became considerable, was broken in 1410, at the Battle of Grunwald, where the Order suffered a devastating defeat against a joint Polish-Lithuanian army. After Grunwald, the Order declined in power until 1809 when it was officially dissolved. There were ten crusades in total.

=== Golden age of monasticism ===
- The late 11th century/early-mid 12th century was the height of the golden age of Christian monasticism (8th-12th centuries).
  - Benedictine Order – black-robed monks
  - Cistercian Order – white-robed monks
    - Bernard of Clairvaux

=== Mendicant orders ===
- The 13th century saw the rise of the Mendicant orders such as the:
  - Franciscans (Friars Minor, commonly known as the Grey Friars), founded 1209
  - Carmelites (Hermits of the Blessed Virgin Mary of Carmel, commonly known as the White Friars), founded 1206–1214
  - Dominicans (Order of Preachers, commonly called the Black Friars), founded 1215
  - Augustinians (Hermits of St. Augustine, commonly called the Austin Friars), founded 1256

=== Heretical movements ===
Christian heresies existed in Europe before the 11th century but only in small numbers and of local character: in most cases, a rogue priest, or a village returning to pagan traditions. However, beginning in the 11th century, mass-movement heresies appeared. The roots of this can be partially sought in the rise of urban cities, free merchants, and a new money-based economy. The rural values of monasticism held little appeal to urban people who began to form sects more in tune with urban culture. The first large-scale heretical movements in Western Europe originated in the newly urbanized areas such as southern France and northern Italy and were probably influenced by the Bogomils and other dualist movements. These heresies were on a scale the Catholic Church had never seen before and as such the response was one of elimination for some (such as the Cathars). Some Catholic monastic leaders, such as Francis of Assisi, the founder of the Franciscans, had to be recognized directly by the Pope so as not to be confused with actual heretical movements such as the Waldensians.

==== Cathars ====
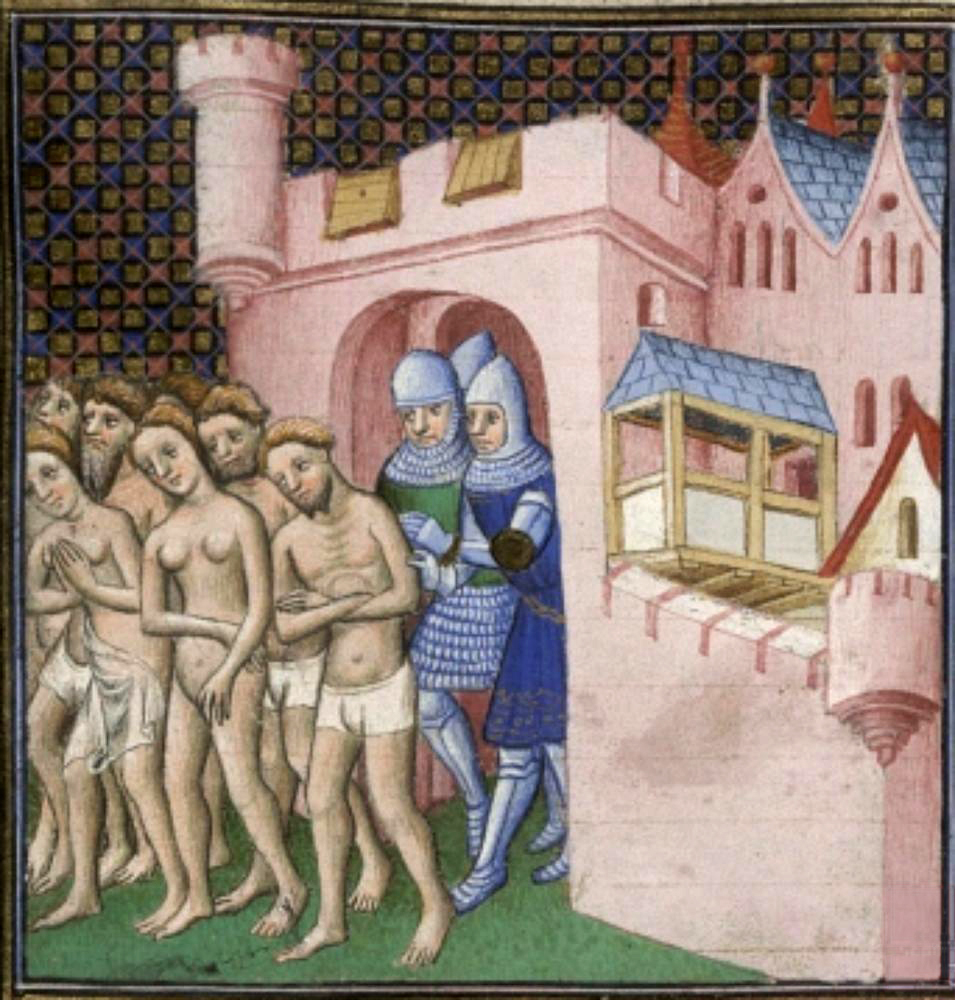
Cathars being expelled from Carcassonne in 1209

Catharism was a movement with Gnostic elements that originated around the middle of the 10th century, branded by the contemporary Roman Catholic Church as heretical. It existed throughout much of Western Europe, but its origination was in Languedoc and surrounding areas in southern France.

The name Cathar stems from Greek katharos, "pure". One of the first recorded uses is Eckbert von Schönau who wrote on heretics from Cologne in 1181: "Hos nostra Germania catharos appellat." ([In] our Germany [one] calls these [people] "Cathars".)

The Cathars are also called Albigensians. This name originates from the end of the 12th century, and was used by the chronicler Geoffroy du Breuil of Vigeois in 1181. The name refers to the southern town of Albi (the ancient Albiga). The designation is hardly exact, for the centre was at Toulouse and in the neighbouring districts.

The Albigensians were strong in southern France, northern Italy, and the southwestern Holy Roman Empire.

The Bogomils were strong in the Southeastern Europe, and became the official religion supported by the Bosnian kings.

- Dualists believed that historical events were the result of struggle between a good (spiritual) force and an evil (material) force and that the world was of the evil force, though it could be controlled or defeated through asceticism and good works.
- Albigensian Crusade, Simon de Montfort, Montségur, Château de Quéribus

==== Waldensians ====
Peter Waldo of Lyon was a wealthy merchant who gave up his riches around 1175 after a religious experience and became a preacher. He founded the Waldensians which became a Christian sect believing that all religious practices should have strictly scriptural bases. Waldo was denied the right to preach his sermons by the Third Lateran Council in 1179, which he did not obey and continued to speak freely until he was excommunicated in 1184. Waldo was critical of the Christian clergy saying they did not live according to the word. He rejected the practice of selling indulgences (simony), as well as the common saint cult practices of the day.

Waldensians are considered a forerunner to the Protestant Reformation, and they melted into Protestantism with the outbreak of the Reformation and became a part of the wider Reformed tradition after the views of John Calvin and his theological successors in Geneva proved very similar to their own theological thought. Waldensian churches still exist, located on several continents.

== Trade and commerce ==
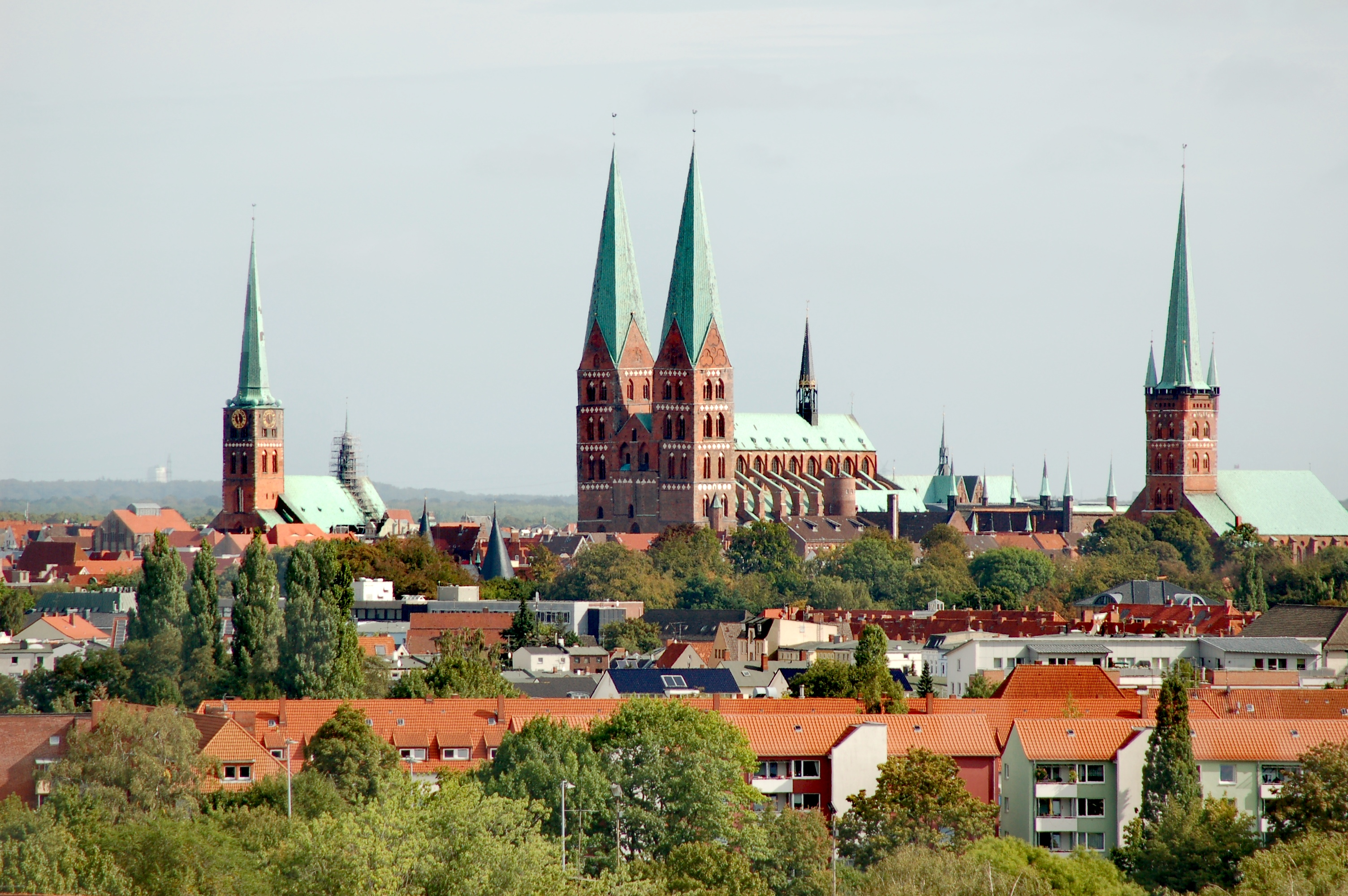
Lübeck, de facto capital of the Hanseatic League

In Northern Europe, the Hanseatic League, a federation of free cities to advance trade by sea, was founded in the 12th century, with the foundation of the city of Lübeck, which would later dominate the League, in 1158–1159. Many northern cities of the Holy Roman Empire became Hanseatic cities, including Cologne, Bremen, Hanover and Berlin. Hanseatic cities outside the Holy Roman Empire were, for instance, Bruges and the Polish city of Gdańsk (Danzig), as well as Königsberg, capital of the monastic state of the Teutonic Knights. In Bergen, Norway and Veliky Novgorod, Russia the league had factories and middlemen. In this period the Germans started colonising Europe beyond the Empire, into Prussia and Silesia.

In the late 13th century, a Venetian explorer named Marco Polo became one of the first Europeans to travel the Silk Road to China. Westerners became more aware of the Far East when Polo documented his travels in Il Milione. He was followed by numerous Christian missionaries to the East, such as William of Rubruck, Giovanni da Pian del Carpine, André de Longjumeau, Odoric of Pordenone, Giovanni de' Marignolli, Giovanni di Monte Corvino, and other travellers such as Niccolò de' Conti.

== Natural philosophy ==
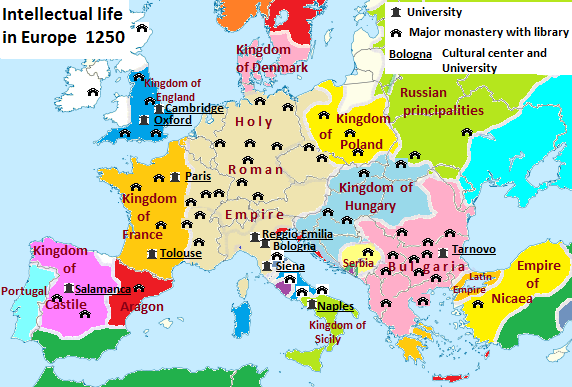
A map of medieval universities and major monasteries with library in 1250

The oldest university currently in continuous operation in the world appeared in the 11th century in Italy (the University of Bologna) and two more were established in the 12th century in France (the University of Paris) and England (the University of Oxford). These new institutions were a foundation for many of Europe's future achievements, especially in science. The increased contact with the Islamic world in Spain and Sicily during the Reconquista, and the Byzantine world and Muslim Levant during the Crusades, allowed Europeans access to scientific Arabic and Greek texts, including the works of Aristotle, Alhazen, and Averroes. The European universities aided materially in the translation and propagation of these texts, catalyzing the rise of scholasticism during Renaissance of the 12th century.

At the beginning of the 13th century there were reasonably accurate Latin translations of the main works of almost all the intellectually crucial ancient authors, The natural philosophy contained in these texts was assimilated by notable scholastics such as Robert Grosseteste, Roger Bacon, Albertus Magnus and Duns Scotus. Precursors of the modern scientific method can be seen already in Grosseteste's emphasis on mathematics as a way to understand nature, and in the empirical approach admired by Bacon, particularly in his Opus Majus.

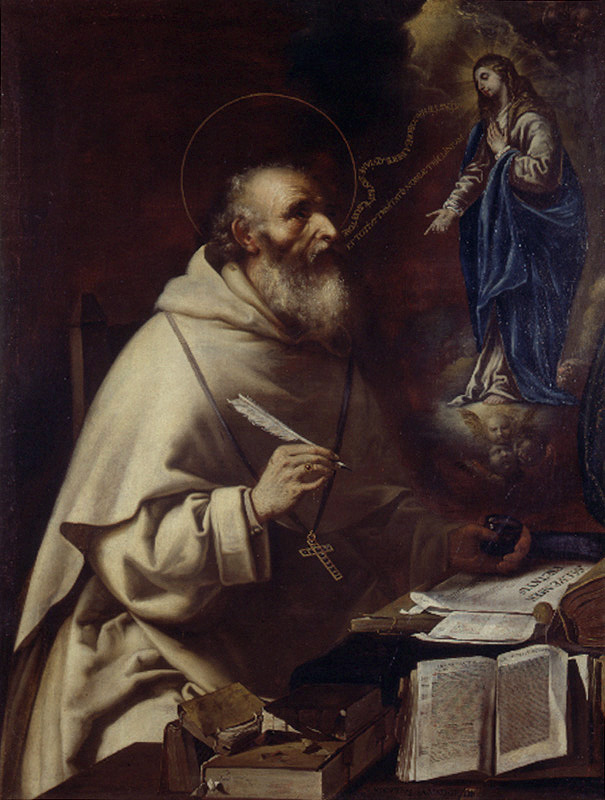
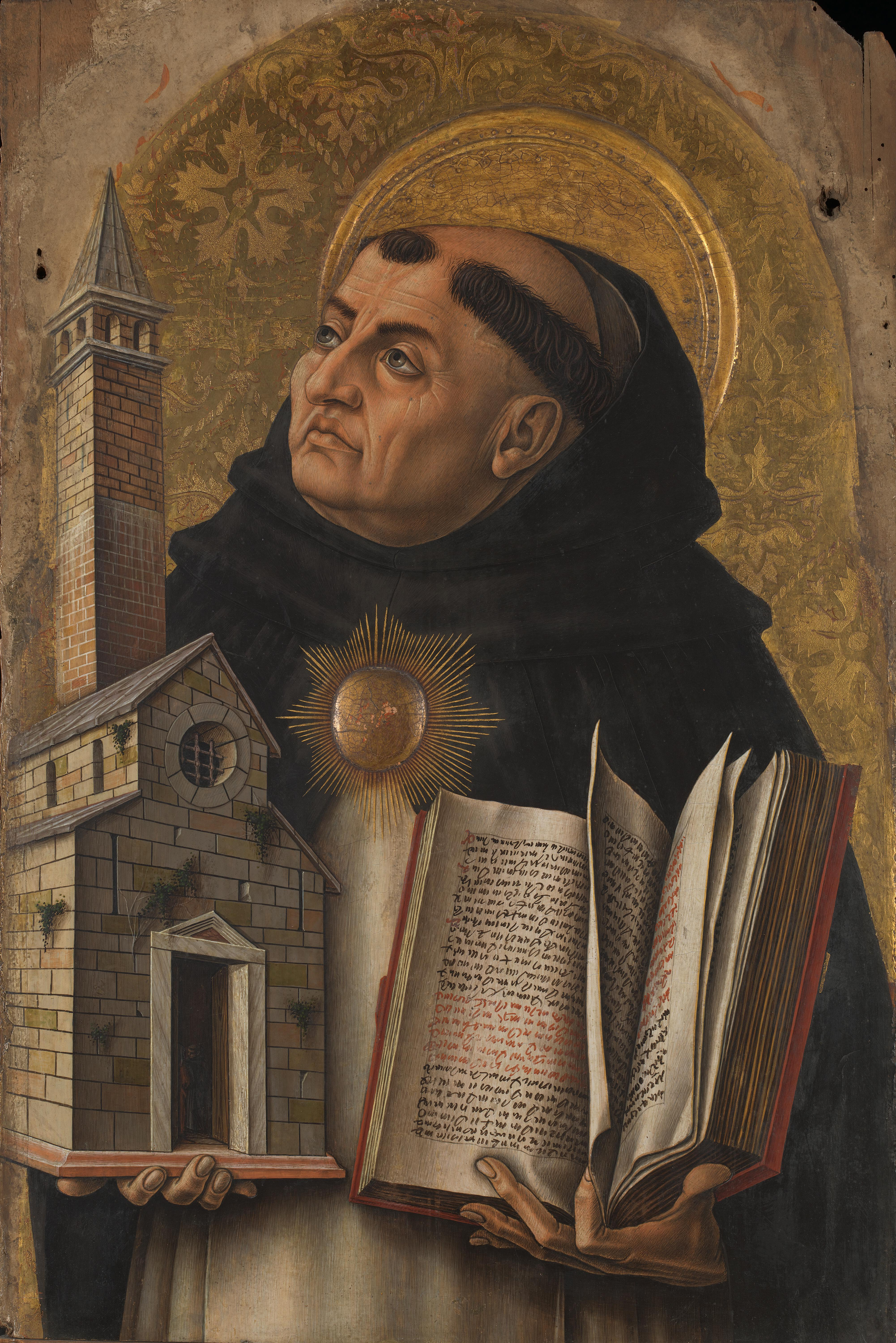
Left: Albert Magnus. Right: Thomas Aquinas

The new Christian method of learning was influenced by Anselm of Canterbury (1033–1109) from the rediscovery of the works of Aristotle, at first indirectly through Medieval Jewish and Muslim Philosophy (Maimonides, Avicenna, and Averroes) and then through Aristotle's own works brought back from Byzantine and Muslim libraries; and those whom he influenced, most notably Albertus Magnus, Bonaventure and Abélard. Many scholastics believed in empiricism and supporting Roman Catholic doctrines through secular study, reason, and logic. They opposed Christian mysticism, and the Platonist-Augustinian belief that the mind is an immaterial substance. The most famous of the scholastics was Thomas Aquinas (later declared a "Doctor of the Church"), who led the move away from the Platonic and Augustinian and towards Aristotelianism. Aquinas developed a philosophy of mind by writing that the mind was at birth a tabula rasa ("blank slate") that was given the ability to think and recognize forms or ideas through a divine spark. Other notable scholastics included Muhammad Averroes, Roscelin, Abélard, Peter Lombard, and Francisco Suárez. One of the main questions during this time was the problem of universals. Prominent opponents of various aspects of the scholastic mainstream included Duns Scotus, William of Ockham, Peter Damian, Bernard of Clairvaux, and the Victorines.

=== Technology ===
During the 12th and 13th century in Europe there was a radical change in the rate of new inventions, innovations in the ways of managing traditional means of production, and economic growth. In less than a century there were more inventions developed and applied usefully than in the previous thousand years of human history all over the globe. The period saw major technological advances, including the adoption or invention of windmills, watermills, printing (though not yet with movable type), gunpowder, the astrolabe, glasses, scissors of the modern shape, a better clock, and greatly improved ships. The latter two advances made possible the dawn of the Age of Discovery. These inventions were influenced by foreign culture and society.

Alfred W. Crosby described some of this technological revolution in The Measure of Reality: Quantification in Western Europe, 1250-1600 and other major historians of technology have also noted it.

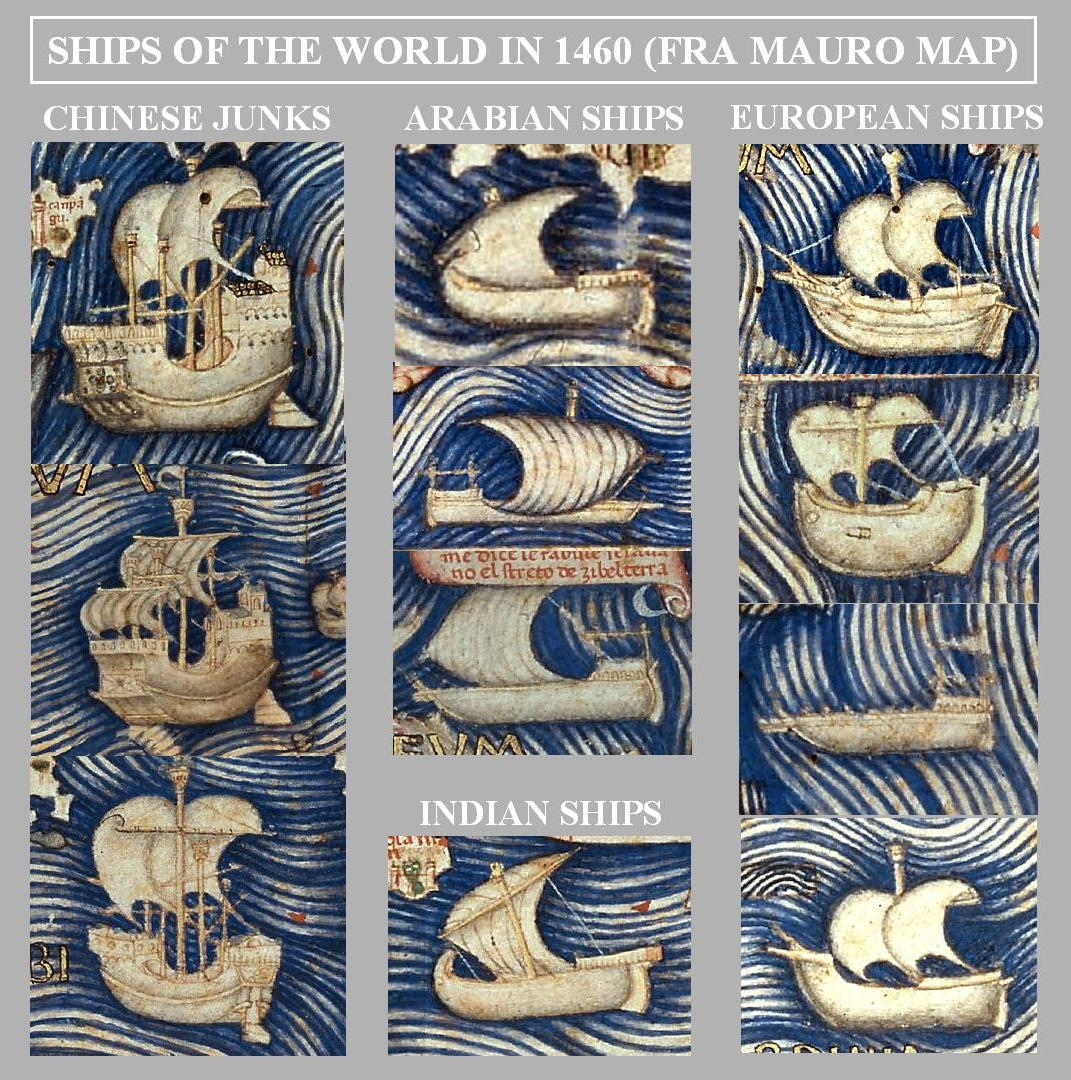
Ships of the world in 1460, according to the Fra Mauro map.

- The earliest written record of a windmill is from Yorkshire, England, dated 1185.
- Paper manufacture began in Italy around 1270.
- The spinning wheel was brought to Europe (probably from India) in the 13th century.
- The magnetic compass aided navigation, first reaching Europe some time in the late 12th century.
- Eye glasses were invented in Italy in the late 1280s.
- The astrolabe returned to Europe via Islamic Spain.
- Fibonacci introduces Hindu-Arabic numerals to Europe with his book Liber Abaci in 1202.
- The West's oldest known depiction of a stern-mounted rudder can be found on church carvings dating to around 1180.

== Arts ==
=== Visual arts ===
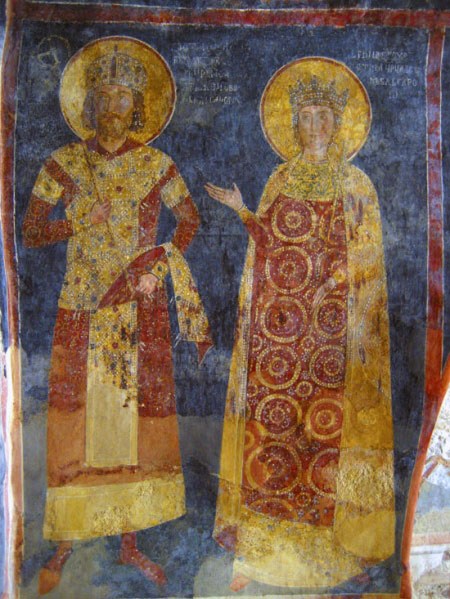
Fresco from the Boyana Church depicting Emperor Constantine Tikh Asen. The murals are among the finest achievements of the Bulgarian culture in the 13th century.

Art in the High Middle Ages includes these important movements:

- Anglo-Saxon art was influential on the British Isles until the Norman Invasion of 1066
- Romanesque art continued traditions from the Classical world (not to be confused with Romanesque architecture)
- Gothic art developed a distinct Germanic flavor (not to be confused with Gothic architecture).
- Indo-Islamic architecture begins when Muhammad of Ghor made Delhi a Muslim capital
- Byzantine art continued earlier Byzantine traditions, influencing much of Eastern Europe.
- Illuminated manuscripts gained prominence both in the Catholic and Orthodox churches

=== Architecture ===
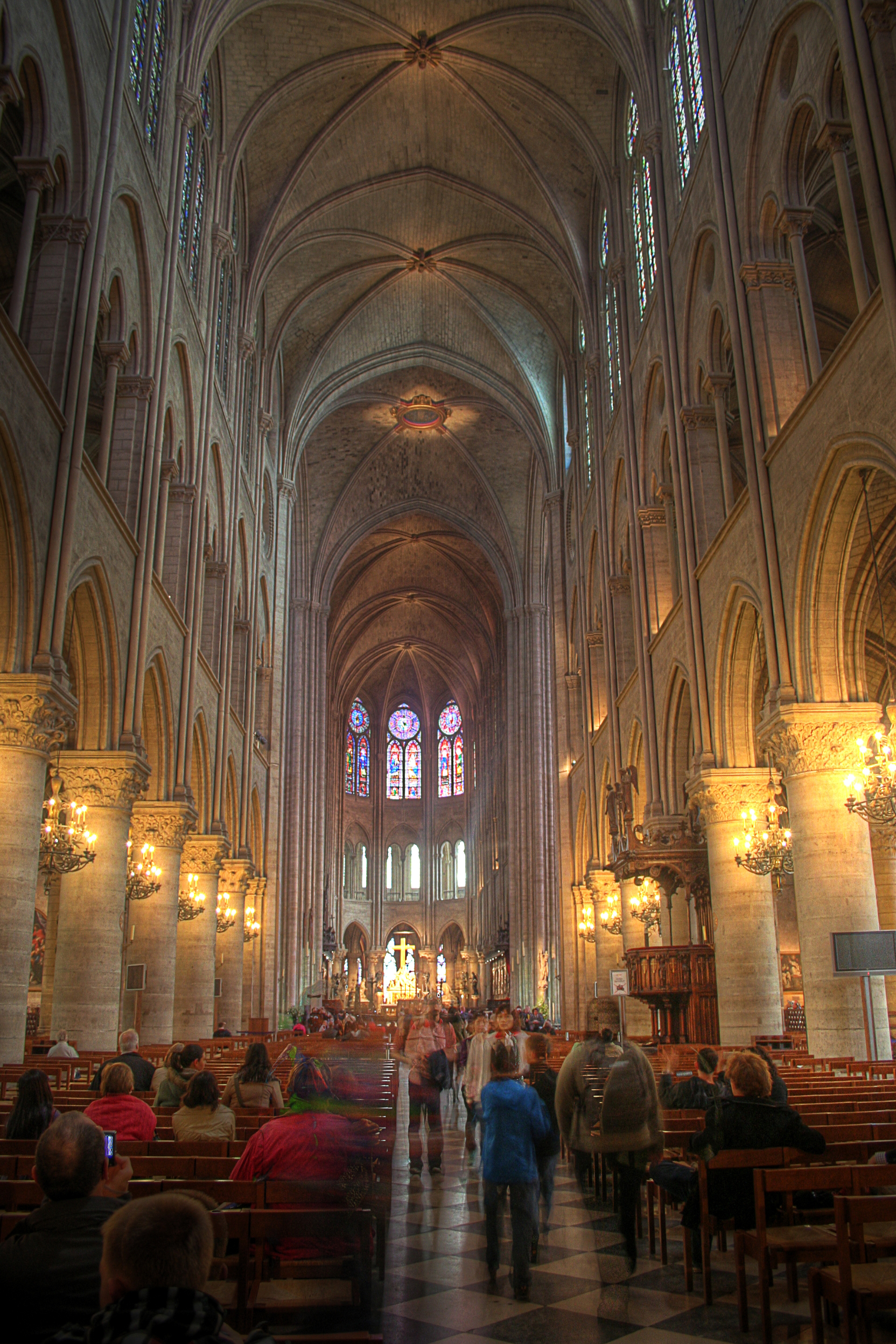
Interior of Nôtre Dame de Paris

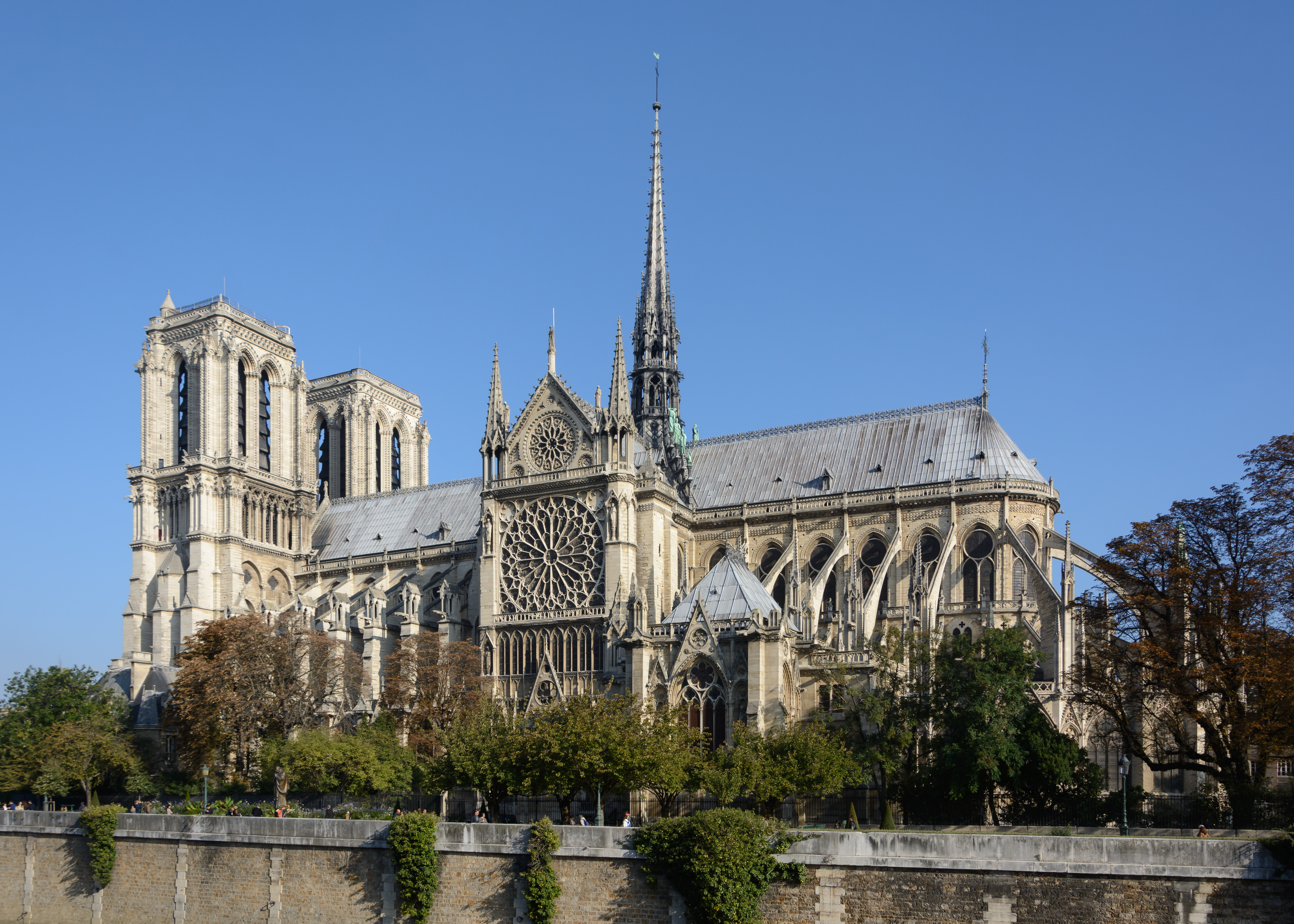
The cathedral of Notre Dame de Paris, whose construction began in 1163, is one of the finer examples of the High Middle Ages architecture

Gothic architecture superseded the Romanesque style by combining flying buttresses, gothic (or pointed) arches and ribbed vaults. It was influenced by the spiritual background of the time, being religious in essence: thin horizontal lines and grates made the building strive towards the sky. Architecture was made to appear light and weightless, as opposed to the dark and bulky forms of the previous Romanesque style. It was commonly thought that light was an expression of God; therefore, architectural techniques were adapted and developed to build churches that reflected this teaching. Colorful glass windows enhanced the spirit of lightness. As color was much rarer at medieval times than today, it can be assumed that these virtuoso works of art had an awe-inspiring impact on the common man from the street. High-rising intricate ribbed, and later fan vaultings demonstrated movement toward heaven. Veneration of God was also expressed by the relatively large size of these buildings. A gothic cathedral therefore not only invited the visitors to elevate themselves spiritually, it was also meant to demonstrate the greatness of God. The floor plan of a gothic cathedral corresponded to the rules of scholasticism: According to Erwin Panofsky's Gothic Architecture and Scholasticism, the plan was divided into sections and uniform subsections. These characteristics are exhibited by the most famous sacral building of the time: Notre Dame de Paris.

=== Literature ===
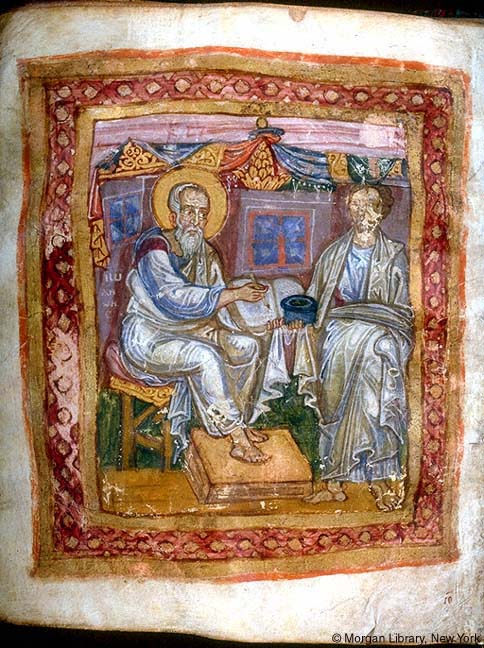
John the Apostle and, only according to Robert Eisler's interpretation, Marcion of Sinope in an Italian illuminated manuscript, painting on vellum, 11th century

A variety of cultures influenced the literature of the High Middle Ages, one of the strongest among them being Christianity. The connection to Christianity was greatest in Latin literature, which influenced the vernacular languages in the literary cycle of the Matter of Rome. Other literary cycles, or interrelated groups of stories, included the Matter of France (stories about Charlemagne and his court), the Acritic songs dealing with the chivalry of Byzantium's frontiersmen, and perhaps the best known cycle, the Matter of Britain, which featured tales about King Arthur, his court, and related stories from Brittany, Cornwall, Wales and Ireland. An anonymous German poet tried to bring the Germanic myths from the Migration Period to the level of the French and British epics, producing the Nibelungenlied. There was also a quantity of poetry and historical writings which were written during this period, such as Historia Regum Britanniae by Geoffrey of Monmouth.

Despite political decline during the late 12th and much of the 13th centuries, the Byzantine scholarly tradition remained particularly fruitful over the time period. One of the most prominent philosophers of the 11th century, Michael Psellos, reinvigorated Neoplatonism on Christian foundations and bolstered the study of ancient philosophical texts, along with contributing to history, grammar, and rhetorics. His pupil and successor at the head of Philosophy at the University of Constantinople Ioannes Italos continued the Platonic line in Byzantine thought and was criticized by the Church for holding opinions it considered heretical, such as the doctrine of transmigration. Two Orthodox theologians important in the dialogue between the eastern and western churches were Nikephoros Blemmydes and Maximus Planudes. Byzantine historical tradition also flourished with the works of the brothers Niketas and Michael Choniates in the beginning of the 13th century and George Akropolites a generation later. Dating from 12th century Byzantine Empire is also Timarion, an Orthodox Christian anticipation of Divine Comedy. Around the same time the so-called Byzantine novel rose in popularity with its synthesis of ancient pagan and contemporaneous Christian themes.

At the same time southern France gave birth to Occitan literature, which is best known for troubadours who sang of courtly love. It included elements from Latin literature and Arab-influenced Spain and North Africa. Later its influence spread to several cultures in Western Europe, notably in Portugal and the Minnesänger in Germany. Provençal literature also reached Sicily and Northern Italy laying the foundation of the "sweet new style" of Dante and later Petrarca. Indeed, the most important poem of the Late Middle Ages, the allegorical Divine Comedy, is to a large degree a product of both the theology of Thomas Aquinas and the largely secular Occitan literature.

=== Music ===
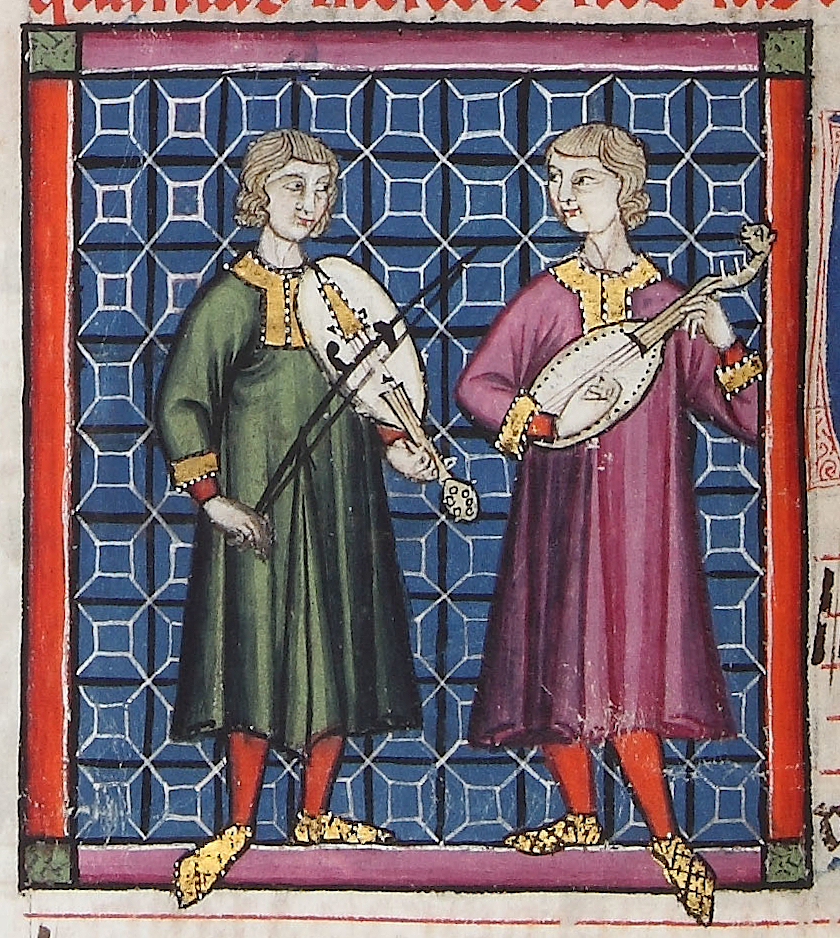
Musicians playing the Spanish vihuela, one with a bow, the other plucked by hand, in the Cantigas de Santa Maria of Alfonso X of Castile, 13th century

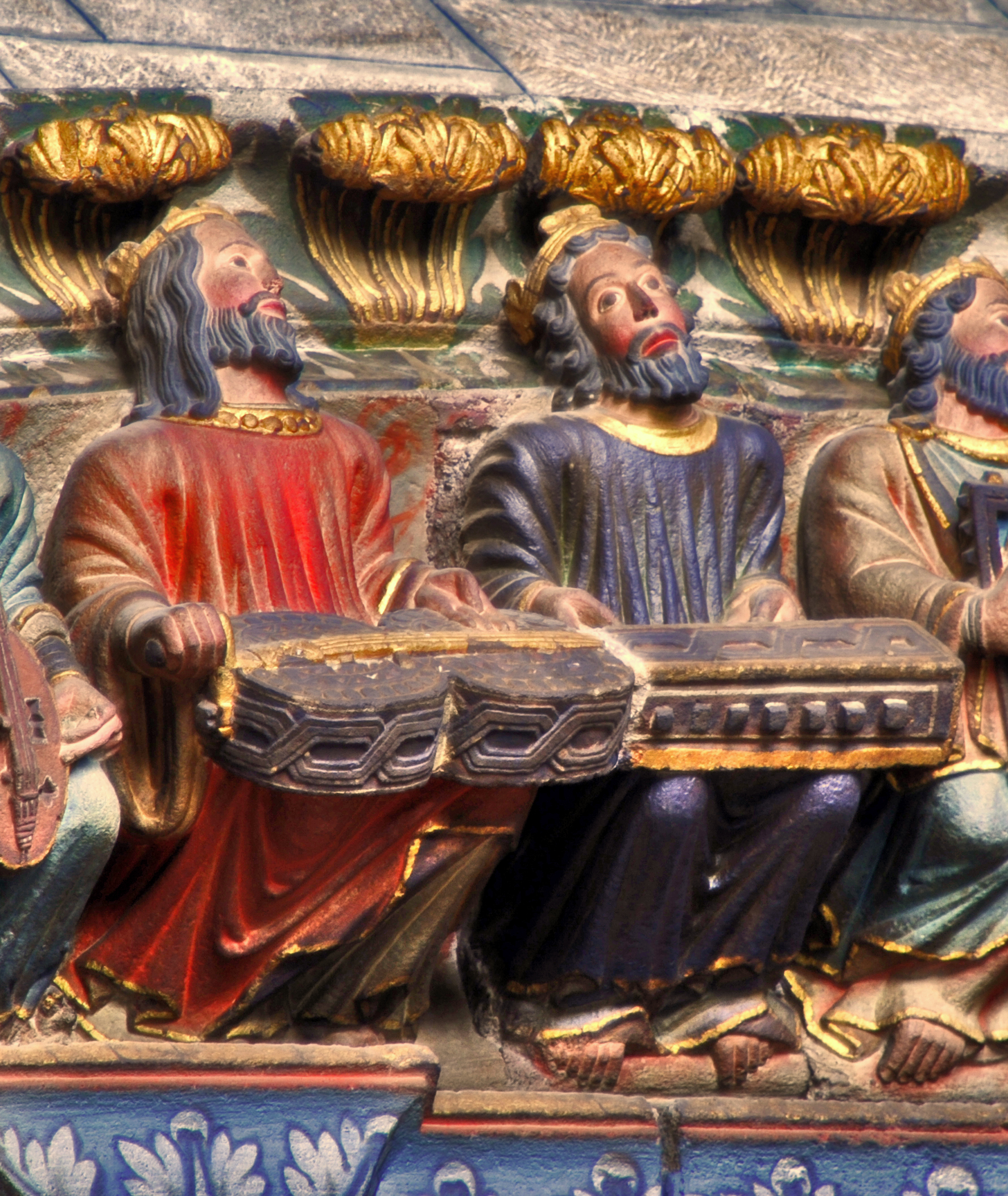
Men playing the organistrum, from the Ourense Cathedral, Spain, 12th century

The surviving music of the High Middle Ages is primarily religious in nature, since music notation developed in religious institutions, and the application of notation to secular music was a later development. Early in the period, Gregorian chant was the dominant form of church music; other forms, beginning with organum, and later including clausulae, conductus, and the motet, developed using the chant as source material.

During the 11th century, Guido of Arezzo was one of the first to develop musical notation, which made it easier for singers to remember Gregorian chants.

It was during the 12th and 13th centuries that Gregorian plainchant gave birth to polyphony, which appeared in the works of French Notre Dame School (Léonin and Pérotin). Later it evolved into the ars nova (Philippe de Vitry, Guillaume de Machaut) and the musical genres of late Middle Ages. An important composer during the 12th century was the nun Hildegard of Bingen.

The most significant secular movement was that of the troubadours, who arose in Occitania (Southern France) in the late 11th century. The troubadours were often itinerant, came from all classes of society, and wrote songs on a variety of topics, though with a particular focus on courtly love. Their style went on to influence the trouvères of northern France, the minnesingers of Germany, and the composers of secular music of the Trecento in northern Italy.

=== Theatre ===
Economic and political changes in the High Middle Ages led to the formation of guilds and the growth of towns, and this would lead to significant changes for theatre starting in this time and continuing into the Late Middle Ages. Trade guilds began to perform plays, usually religiously based, and often dealing with a biblical story that referenced their profession. For instance, a baker's guild would perform a reenactment of the Last Supper. In the British Isles, plays were produced in some 127 different towns during the Middle Ages. These vernacular Mystery plays were written in cycles of a large number of plays: York (48 plays), Chester (24), Wakefield (32) and Unknown (42). A larger number of plays survive from France and Germany in this period and some type of religious dramas were performed in nearly every European country in the Late Middle Ages. Many of these plays contained comedy, devils, villains and clowns.

There were also a number of secular performances staged in the Middle Ages, the earliest of which is The Play of the Greenwood by Adam de la Halle in 1276. It contains satirical scenes and folk material such as faeries and other supernatural occurrences. Farces also rose dramatically in popularity after the 13th century. The majority of these plays come from France and Germany and are similar in tone and form, emphasizing sex and bodily excretions.

== Timeline ==
- 1054 – East–West Schism
- 1066 – Battle of Hastings
- 1073–1085 – Pope Gregory VII
- 1071 – Battle of Manzikert
- 1077 – Henry IV's Walk to Canossa
- 1086 – Domesday Book
- 1086 – Battle of az-Zallaqah
- 1088 – University of Bologna founded
- 1091 – Battle of Levounion
- 1096 – University of Oxford founded
- 1096–1099 – First Crusade
- 1123 – First Lateran Council
- 1139 – Second Lateran Council
- 1145–1149 – Second Crusade
- 1147 – Wendish Crusade
- c. 1150 – University of Paris founded
- 1155–1190 – Frederick I Barbarossa
- 1159 – foundation of the Hanseatic League
- 1169 – Norman invasion of Ireland
- 1185 – reestablishment of the Bulgarian Empire
- 1189–1192 – Third Crusade
- 1200–1204 – Fourth Crusade
- 1205 – Battle of Adrianople
- 1209 – University of Cambridge founded
- 1209 – foundation of the Franciscan Order
- 1209–1229 – Albigensian Crusade
- 1212 – Battle of Las Navas de Tolosa
- 1214 - Battle of Bouvines - Medieval France is a rising power
- 1215 – Magna Carta
- 1216 – recognition of the Dominican Order
- 1215 – Fourth Lateran Council
- 1217–1221 – Fifth Crusade
- 1218 – University of Salamanca founded
- 1220–1250 – Frederick II
- 1222 – University of Padua founded
- 1223 – approval of the Franciscan Rule of Life
- 1228–1229 – Sixth Crusade
- 1230 – Prussian Crusade
- 1230 – Battle of Klokotnitsa
- 1237–1242 – Mongol invasion of Europe
- 1241 – Battle of Legnica and Battle of Mohi
- 1242 – Battle of the Ice
- 1248–1254 – Seventh Crusade
- 1257 – foundation of the Collège de Sorbonne
- 1261 – the Byzantine Empire reconquers Constantinople.
- 1274 – death of Thomas Aquinas; Summa Theologica published
- 1277-1280 – Uprising of Ivaylo – Medieval Europe's only successful peasant uprising
- 1280 – death of Albertus Magnus
- 1291 – Acre, the last European outpost in the Near East, is captured by the Mamluks under Khalil.

== See also ==
- Early Middle Ages
- Late Middle Ages
- Middle Ages
- Post-classical history
- Gothic book illustration

== Notes ==
=== Works cited ===
- Adamson, Peter (2016). Philosophy in the Islamic World: A History of Philosophy Without Any Gaps. Oxford University Press. ISBN 978-0-19-957749-1.
- Fakhry, Majid (2001), Averroes (Ibn Rushd) His Life, Works and Influence, Oneworld Publications, ISBN 978-1-85168-269-0
- Taylor, Richard C. (2005). "Averroes: religious dialectic and Aristotelian philosophical thought". In Peter Adamson; Richard C. Taylor (eds.). The Cambridge Companion to Arabic Philosophy. Cambridge University Press. pp. 180–200. ISBN 978-0-521-52069-0.
