= Byzantine civilisation in the 12th century =

During the 12th century, the civilization of the Byzantine Empire experienced a period of intense change and development. This has led some historians to refer to a 12th-century 'Renaissance' in Byzantine cultural and intellectual achievement. These changes were particularly significant in two areas of Byzantine civilization: its economic prosperity, and its artistic output.

== Economic expansion ==
Recent research has revealed that the 12th century was a time of significant growth in the rural economy, with rising population levels and extensive tracts of new agricultural land being brought into production. The widespread construction of new rural churches is a strong indication that prosperity was being generated even in remote areas. A steady increase in population led to a higher population density in many areas of the empire, and there is good evidence that the demographic increase was accompanied by the return of a thriving network of revitalised towns and cities. According to Alan Harvey in his book Economic expansion in the Byzantine Empire 900–1200, archaeological evidence from both Europe and Asia Minor shows a considerable increase in the size of urban settlements, together with a "notable upsurge" in new towns. For example, Harvey explains that in Athens the medieval town experienced a period of rapid and sustained growth, starting in the 11th century and continuing until the end of the 12th century. The 'agora' or 'marketplace', which had been deserted since late antiquity, began to be built over, and soon the town became an important centre for the production of soaps and dyes. Thessaloniki, the second city of the Empire, hosted a famous summer fair which attracted traders from across the Balkans and even further afield to its bustling market stalls. In Corinth, silk production fuelled a thriving economy.

Unlike complex systems of governance where different factions and government positions conducted law differently and according to their own needs such as in the Angevin Empire, Byzantine law of this period was generally more efficient and applied to almost everyone with the most powerful and certain kinds of royal officials being exceptions, spurring patriotism and optimism among people in different roles in Byzantine society which led to reform and increased effectiveness of the state and local areas. Violence in punishment saw a decrease from previous centuries, most theme leaders were loyal to the emperor, and cultural diversity aided the Empire unlike in the Angevin lands, where "barons [and lands] of the north[ern borderlands]" near Scotland were generally not loyal to the king and de facto independent, and the Kingdom of France during this era due to its rivalry with the Angevin part of its domain.

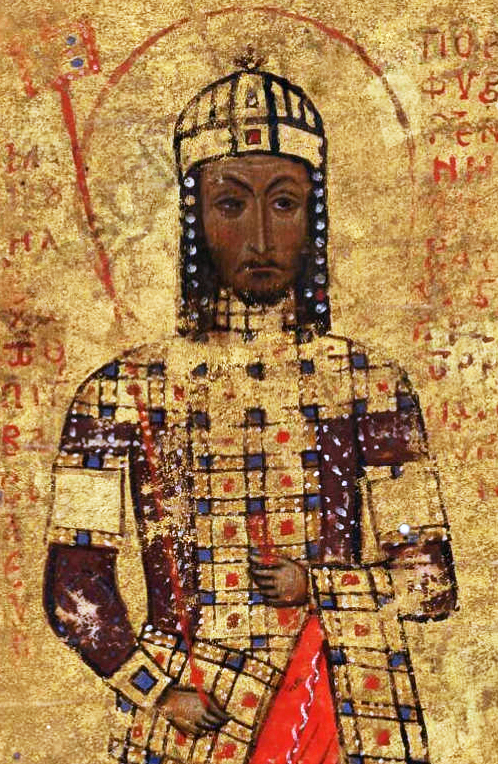
Emperor Manuel I Komnenos who reigned from 1143 to 1180. He is shown wearing imperial regalia.

Further evidence is provided by the coinage of the empire in this period. After a long period in the early Middle Ages during which the only coins were struck in Constantinople, the 12th century saw the return of a provincial mint regularly operating at Thessaloniki. Yet the most convincing evidence for what Harvey calls a "substantial increase in the volume of money in circulation" comes from the quantity of coins found on archaeological sites. Thousands of coins have been found both at Athens and at Corinth. Some idea of the scale of the expansion that took place here can be gained from comparing the number of Corinthian coins dating from the reign of Theophilos (813–842), at the start of the expansion, with the number of coins dating from other periods. Harvey states that "About 150 coins can be attributed to this emperor compared with only twenty from the previous century". By contrast, excavations in 1939 revealed 4495 coins dating from the reign of Alexios I Komnenos (1081–1118) and 4106 coins from that of Manuel I Komnenos (1143–1180). At Athens, coins from the Komnenian period have also been found in abundance (over 4,000 from Manuel's reign).

Similar evidence of economic expansion has been discovered elsewhere in the empire, especially in the European provinces. In Asia Minor, some areas had become depopulated due to Turkish raiding in the late 11th century. Yet as the Komnenian emperors built up extensive fortifications in rural areas during the 12th century, repopulation of the countryside took place. The restoration of order in western Asia Minor enabled the demographic trend to resume its upward course after the setbacks of the late 11th century, and indeed it was in the 13th century that this process reached its peak. It is quite possible that an increase in trade, made possible by the growth of the Italian city-states, may have been a factor in the growth of the economy. Certainly, the Venetians and others were active traders in the ports of the Holy Land, and they made a living out of shipping goods between the Crusader Kingdoms of Outremer and the West while also trading extensively with Byzantium and Egypt.

Overall, given that both population and prosperity increased substantially in this period, economic recovery in Byzantium appears to have been strengthening the economic basis of the state. This helps to explain how the Komnenian emperors, Manuel Komnenos in particular, were able to project their power and influence so widely at this time. Yet this is by no means the only effect of economic expansion in the empire; the effect on Byzantine culture and society was also quite profound.

== Artistic revival ==
The new wealth being generated during this period had a positive impact on Byzantine cultural life. In artistic terms, the 12th century was a very productive period in Byzantine history. There was a revival in the mosaic art, for example, with artists showing great interest in depicting natural landscapes with wild animals and scenes from the hunt. Mosaics became more realistic and vivid, with an increased emphasis on depicting three-dimensional forms. In the provinces, regional schools of architecture began producing many distinctive styles that drew on a range of cultural influences. All this suggests that there was an increased demand for art, with more people having access to the necessary wealth to commission and pay for such work.

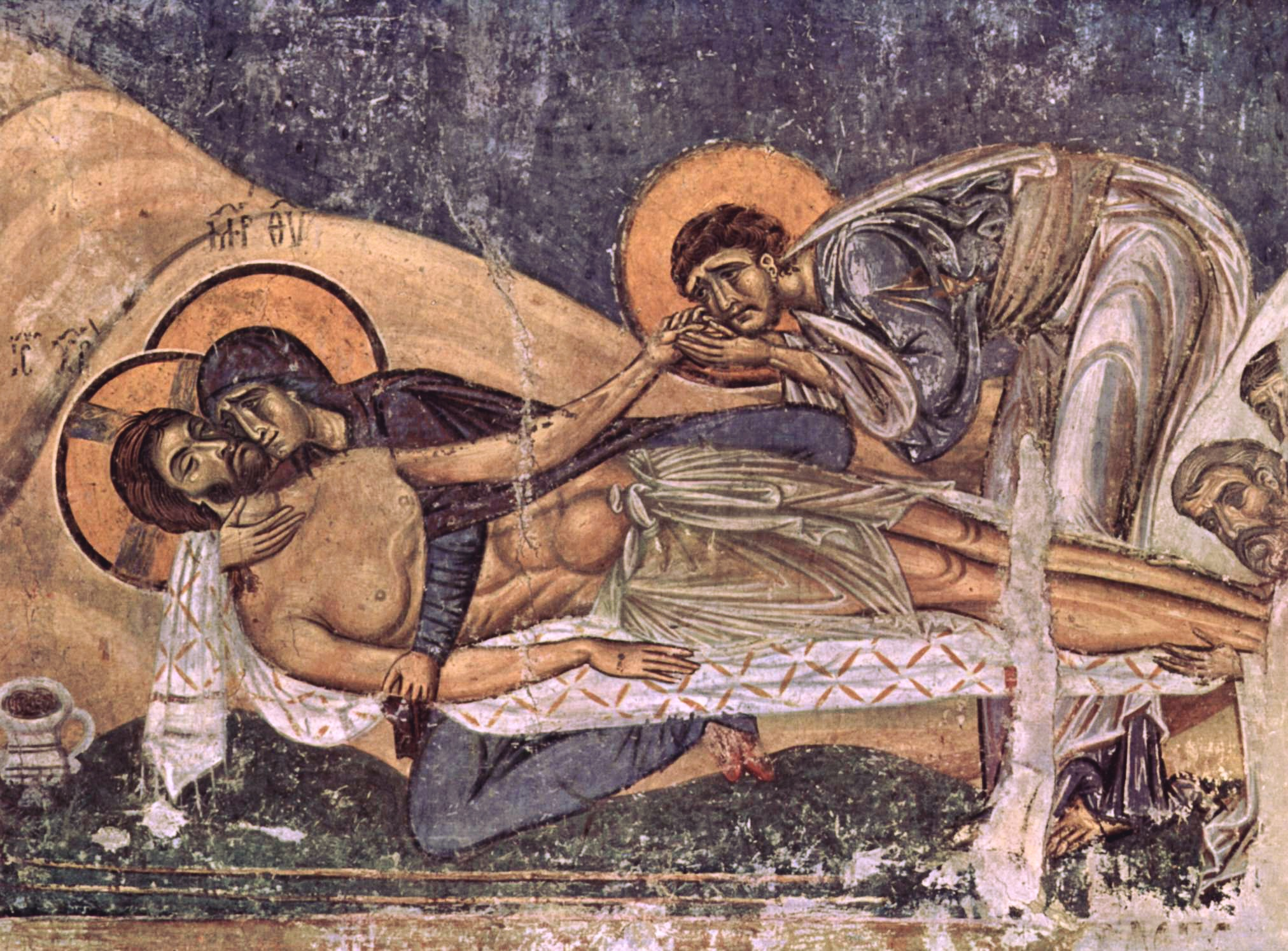
'The Lamentation of Christ' (1164), a fresco from the church of Saint Panteleimon in Nerezi near Skopje. It is considered a superb example of twelfth century Komnenian art.

== Bibliography ==
- Alan Harvey – "Economic expansion in the Byzantine empire 900–1200"
- Paul Magdalino – "The empire of Manuel I Komnenos 1143–1180"
- N.H.Baynes – "Byzantium, an introduction to East Roman civilization"
- Charles Diehl – Byzantine Art
