= List of compositions by Giovanni Pierluigi da Palestrina =

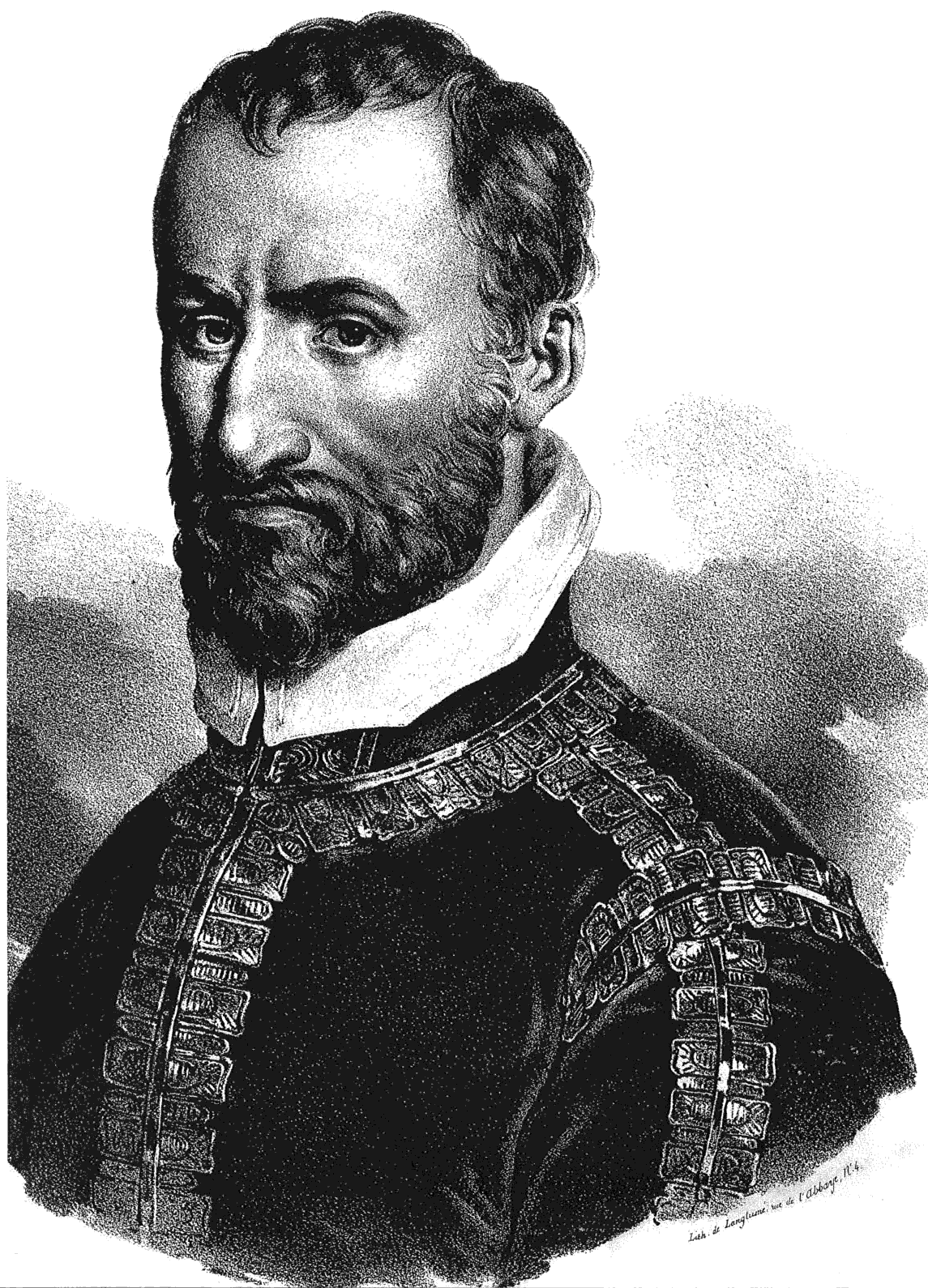
Giovanni Pierluigi da Palestrina, lithograph by Henri-Joseph Hesse

This is a list of compositions by Giovanni Pierluigi da Palestrina, sorted by genre. The volume (given in parentheses for motets) refers to the volume of the Breitkopf & Härtel complete edition in which the work can be found. Six of the volumes of masses and some of his motets and other works were published in these editions during Palestrina's lifetime. Others were collected later, from papal choirbooks and other sources. The dates of most pieces are unknown, unless they were known to have been composed in connection with some celebration. Of those works published during Palestrina's lifetime, many were composed considerably earlier than their date of publication, and of the others a large number remained unpublished until the 19th century.

The 32 volumes of Palestrina's collected works were published by Breitkopf & Härtel between 1862 and 1907. The volumes of the masses maintain the order of works in the previously published volumes (with the Collected Works Vol. 10 corresponding to the first book of Masses, and so on.) Some of the pieces in the last three volumes, 30–32, are considered spurious or doubtful.

== Masses ==
Masses
Title	Voices	Opera Omnia Volume	First published	Composition type	Model
Missa Ad coenam agni	5	10	1554	Paraphrase	Easter hymn
Missa ad fugam	4	11	1567	Canon	
Missa Aeterna Christi munera	4	14	1590	Paraphrase	Hymn from matins for Apostles and Evangelists
Missa Alma redemptoris	6	20	1600	Paraphrase	Marian antiphon for Advent & Christmastide
Missa Ascendo ad patrem	5	21	1601	Parody	Palestrina's motet
Missa Aspice Domine	5	11	1567	Parody	Motet by Jacquet de Mantua
Missa Assumpta est Maria	6	23		Parody	Palestrina's motet
Missa Ave Maria	4	16	1594	Paraphrase	Marian antiphon
Missa Ave Maria	6	15	1594	Tenor	Marian antiphon
Missa Ave regina coelorum	4	18	1599	Paraphrase	Ave Regina caelorum, Marian antiphon
Missa Beatus Laurentius	5	23		Parody	Palestrina's motet
Missa Benedicta es caelorum regina (Missa sine titulo a6)	6	24		Parody	Motet by Josquin des Prez
Missa brevis	4	12	1570		Freely composed
Missa Confitebor tibi Domine	8	22	1585	Parody	Palestrina's motet
Missa de beata Marie Virginis (I)	5			Paraphrase	Mantuan
Missa de beata Marie Virginis (II)	5			Paraphrase	Mantuan
Missa de beata Marie Virginis (III)	5			Paraphrase	Mantuan
Missa de beata Virgine	4	11	1567	Paraphrase	Mass IX, Credo I, Mass XVII
Missa de beata Virgine (vel dominicalis)	6	12	1570	Paraphrase	Mass IX, Credo I, Mass XVII
Missa de feria	4	12	1570	Paraphrase	Plainsong
Missa Descendit angelus Domini	4	20	1600	Parody	Motet by Hilaire Penet
Missa Dies sanctificatus	4	15	1594	Parody	Palestrina's motet
Missa Dilexi quoniam	5	15	1594	Parody	Motet by Maffoni
Missa Dominicalis	5	33	1592	Paraphrase	Mass XI
Missa Dum complerentur	6	17	1599	Parody	Palestrina's motet
Missa Dum esset summus pontifex	4	17	1599	Paraphrase	Antiphon to Magnificat for 2nd Vesper
Missa Ecce ego Joannes	6	24		Parody	Unidentified
Missa Ecce sacerdos magnus	4	10	1554	Tenor	Antiphon in Missa de Confessore Pontifice
Missa Emendemus in melius	4	16	1594	Parody	Unidentified
Missa Eripe me de inimicis (Missa prima a5)	5	13	1582	Parody	Motet by Maillard
Missa Festum nunc celebre (Missa octavi toni)	6	20	1600	Cantus firmus	Latin hymn
Missa Fratres ego enim accepi	8	22	1601	Parody	Palestrina's motet
Missa Gabriel archangelus	4	10	1554	Parody	Motet by Philippe Verdelot
Missa Già fu chi m'ebbe cara	4	19	1600	Parody	Palestrina's madrigal
Missa Hodie Christus natus est	8	22	1601	Parody	Palestrina's motet
Missa Illumina oculos meos	6	19	1600	Parody	Motet by Andreas de Silva
Missa in duplicibus minoribus (I)	5			Paraphrase	Mantuan
Missa in duplicibus minoribus (II)	5			Paraphrase	Mantuan
Missa in festis Apostolorum (I)	5			Paraphrase	Mantuan
Missa in festis Apostolorum (II)	5			Paraphrase	Mantuan
Missa In illo tempore	4	19	1600	Parody	Motet by Pierre Moulu
Missa in majoribus duplicibus	4	23		Paraphrase	Mass II, Gloria I ad lib, Mass IX
Missa in minoribus duplicibus	4	23		Paraphrase	Mass IV, Credo IV
Missa in semiduplicibus majoribus (I)	5			Paraphrase	Mantuan
Missa in semiduplicibus majoribus (II)	5			Paraphrase	Mantuan
Missa In te Domine speravi	4	15	1594	Parody	Unidentified, possibly on motet by Lhéritier/Verdelot
Missa In te Domine speravi	6	18	1599	Parody	Motet by Lupus Hellinck
Missa Inviolata	4	11	1567	Paraphrase	
Missa Io mi son giovinetta (Missa primi toni)	4	12	1570	Parody	Madrigal by Domenico Ferrabosco
Missa Io mi son giovinetta (Sine titulo, S. Maria Maggiore 29)	6	32			
Missa Iste confessor	4	14	1590	Paraphrase	Latin hymn
Missa Jam Christus astra ascenderat	4	14	1590	Paraphrase	Ascentiontide hymn
Missa Je suis deshéritée (Missa sine nomine a4)	4	15	1594	Parody	Chanson by ?Lupi/Cadéac
Missa Jesu nostra redemptio (Missa tertia a4)	4	13	1582	Paraphrase	Hymn for Pentecost
Missa L'homme armé (Missa quarta)	4	13	1582	Paraphrase	L'homme armé, secular song
Missa L'homme armé	5	12	1570	Cantus firmus	L'homme armé (secular song)
Missa Lauda Sion (Missa prima a4)	4	13	1582	Parody	Palestrina's motet
Missa Laudate Dominum omnes gentes	8	22	1601	Parody	Palestrina's motet
Missa Memor esto	5	17	1599	Parody	Palestrina's motet
Missa Nasce la gioia mia	6	14	1590	Parody	Madrigal by Gio. Leonardo Primavera dell' Arpa
Missa Nigra sum	5	14	1590	Parody	Jean l'Héritier's motet Nigra Sum
Missa O admirabile commercium	5	17	1599	Parody	Palestrina's motet
Missa O magnum mysterium (Missa tertia a5)	5	13	1582	Parody	Palestrina's motet O magnum mysterium
Missa O regem coeli	4	10	1554	Parody	Motet by Andreas de Silva
Missa O rex gloriae	4	21	1601	Parody	Palestrina's motet
Missa O sacrum convivium	5	23		Parody	Motet by Morales
Missa O virgo simul et mater	5	19	1600	Parody	Palestrina's motet
Missa Panem nostrum	5	24		Cantus firmus	Pater noster chant
Missa Panis quem ego dabo	4	14	1590	Parody	Motet by Lupus Hellinck
Missa Papae Marcelli	6	11	1567		Freely composed
Missa Pater noster	4	24		Parody	Palestrina's motet, based on plainchant
Missa Petra sancta	5	19	1600	Parody	Palestrina's madrigal Io son ferito
Missa Primi toni	4	13	1582		Freely composed
Missa pro defunctis	5	10	1590	Paraphrase	
Missa Qual è il più grand' amor?	5	21	1601	Parody	Madrigal by Cypriano de Rore
Missa Quam pulchra es	4	15	1594	Parody	Motet by Lupi
Missa Quando lieta sperai	5	20	1600	Parody	Madrigal by Cypriano de Rore
Missa Quem dicunt homines	4	17	1599	Parody	Motet by Jean Richafort
Missa quinti toni	6	19	1600		Freely composed
Missa Regina coeli	5	20	1600	Paraphrase	Marian antiphon for Eastertide
Missa Regina coeli	4	21	1601	Paraphrase	Marian antiphon for Eastertide
Missa Repleatur os meum	5	12	1570		Motet by Jacquet de Mantua
Missa Sacerdos et Pontifex	5	16	1594	Paraphrase	Magnificat antiphon from Comm. Conf. Pont.
Missa Sacerdotes Domini	6	17	1599	Canon	
Missa Salve Regina	5	24		Paraphrase	Marian antiphon
Missa Salvum me fac	5	11	1567	Parody	Motet by Jacquet de Mantua
Missa Sanctorum meritis	4	16	1594	Paraphrase	Hymn
Missa Sicut lilium inter spinas	5	14	1590	Parody	Palestrina's motet
Missa sine nomine	4	11	1567		
Missa sine nomine (a voci mutate)	4				Mantuan
Missa sine nomine	5	18	1599	Canon	
Missa sine nomine	6	10	1590	Parody	?Anon motet Cantabo Domine
Missa Spem in alium	4	12	1570	Parody	Motet by Jacquet de Mantua
Missa Te Deum laudamus	6	18	1599	Paraphrase	Plainsong
Missa Tu es pastor ovium	5	16	1594	Parody	Palestrina's motet
Missa Tu es Petrus (I)	6	21	1601	Paraphrase	Antiphon for SS Peter & Paul
Missa Tu es Petrus (II)	6	24		Parody	Palestrina's motet
Missa Ut Re Mi Fa Sol La	6	12	1570	Cantus firmus	Guidonean hexachord
Missa Veni creator Spiritus	6	23		Cantus firmus	Veni Creator Spiritus, Pentecostal hymn
Missa Veni Sancte Spiritus (Missa secunda)	5	13	1582	Parody	Palestrina's 4vv sequence in I-Rc MS 2760, which is itself a chant paraphrase
Missa Veni sponsa Christi	4	18	1599	Parody	Palestrina's motet
Missa Vestiva i colli	5	18	1599	Parody	Palestrina's madrigal
Missa Viri Galilaei	6	21	1601	Parody	Palestrina's motet
Missa Virtute magna	4	10	1554	Parody	Motet by Andrea de Siva

== Motets ==
The numbers in brackets represent the volume that the work is part of.

=== Four voices ===
- Ad Dominum cum tribularer. Sagittae potentis (5)
- Adoramus te, Christe (5)
- Ad te levavi oculos meos. Miserere nostri Domine (5)
- Alma Redemptoris Mater (5)
- Ascendens Christus in altum (7)
- Ave Maria gratia plena (5)
- Ave Regina caelorum. Gaude gloriosa (5)
- Beatus Laurentius (5)
- Beatus vir qui suffert (5)
- Benedicta sit sancta Trinitas (5)
- Benedictus Dominus Deus (30)
- Confitemini Domino (5)
- Congratulamini mihi omnes (4)
- Deus, qui animae famuli tui Gregorii (7)
- Dies sanctificatus (5)
- Doctor bonus (5)
- Domine quando veneris. Commissa mea (5)
- Domine, secundum actum meum (7)
- Dum aurora finem daret (5)
- Ecce nunc benedicite Dominum (5)
- Ecce nunc benedicite Dominum (7)
- Ego sum panis vivus (5)
- Exaudi Domine (5)
- Fuit homo missus a Deo (5)
- Fundamenta ejus. Numquid Sion dicet (5)
- Gaude Barbara beata (7)
- Gaudent in coelis (5)
- Gloriosi principes (5)
- Haec dies quam fecit (5)
- Heu mihi Domine. Anima mea turbata (5)
- Hic est vere martyr (5)
- Hodie beata virgo Maria (5)
- In diebus illis (5)
- Innocentes pro Christo infantes (7)
- Iste est qui ante Deum (5)
- Isti sunt viri sancti (5)
- Jesus junxit se discipulis (5)
- Lapidabant Stephanum (5)
- Lauda Sion Salvatorem (5)
- Loquebantur variis linguis (5)
- Magnus haereditatis mysterium (5)
- Magnus sanctus Paulus (5)
- Miserere mei Deus (30)
- Missa Herodes spiculatore (5)
- Nativitatis tua (5)
- Ne recorderis peccata mea, Domine (7)
- Nos autem gloriari (5)
- O quam suavis est (30)
- O quantus luctus (5)
- O Rex gloriae (5)
- Princeps gloriosissime Michael Archangele (7)
- Pueri Hebraeorum (5)
- Quae est ista (5)
- Quam pulchri sunt (5)
- Quia vidisti me Thoma (5)
- Salvator mundi salva nos (5)
- Salve Regina. Eia ergo advocata nostra (5)
- Sicut cervus desiderat. Sitivit anima mea (5)
- Sub tuum praesidium (5)
- Super flumina Babylonis (5)
- Surge, propera amica mea (5)
- Surrexit pastor bonus (5)
- Tollite jugum meum (5)
- Tribus miraculis (5)
- Tu es pastor ovium (5)
- Valde honorandus est (5)
- Veni sponsa Christi (5)

=== Five voices ===
Those marked with an asterisk form a cycle of 29 settings from the Canticum Canticorum.

- Adjuro vos, filiae Hierusalem* (4)
- Aegypte noli flere (4)
- Alleluia! tulerunt Dominum (1)
- Angelus Domini descendit de coelo. Et introeuntes in monumentum (3)
- Apparuit caro suo (4)
- Ardens est cor meum (4)
- Ascendo ad patrem meum. Ego rogabo patrem (2)
- Ave Maria (3)
- Ave Regina coelorum (4)
- Ave Trinitatis sanctuarium (4)
- Beatae Mariae Magdalenae (1)
- Beatus Laurentius orabat (1)
- Canite tuba in Sion. Rorate coeli (2)
- Cantantibus organis. Biduanis ac triduanis (3)
- Caput ejus aurum optimum* (4)
- Caro mea vere est cibus (3)
- Coenantibus illis accepit Jesus (2)
- Congrega, Domine. Afflige opprimentes nos (3)
- Corona aurea. Domine praevenisti eum (2)
- Crucem sanctam subiit (1)
- Cum pervenisset beatus Andreas (1)
- Derelinquat implus viam (2)
- Descendi in hortum meum* (4)
- Deus qui dedisti legem (1)
- Dilectus meus descendit in hortum suum* (4)
- Dilectus meus mihi et ego illi* (4)
- Domine Deus, qui conteris. Tu Domine (3)
- Domine secundum actum meum (4)
- Dominus Jesus in qua nocte (2)
- Duo ubera tua* (4)
- Ecce merces sanctorum (4)
- Ecce tu pulcher es, dilecte mi* (4)
- Ego sum panis vivus. Panis quem ego dabo (1)
- Exi cito in plateas (2)
- Exsultate Deo (4)
- Fasciculus myrrhae* (4)
- Fuit homo missus a Deo. Erat Joannes in deserto (3)
- Gaude Barbara beata. Gaude quia meruisti (2)
- Gaude gloriosa (4)
- Guttur tuum sicut* (4)
- Hic est discipulus ille (1)
- Hodie nata est beata Virgo (1)
- Homo quidam fuit (2)
- Inclytae sanctae virginis Catherinae (3)
- In illo tempore egressus (2)
- Introduxit me rex in cellam* (4)
- Jubilate Deo, omnis terra. Laudate nomen ejus (3)
- Laetus Hyperboream. O patruo pariterque (4)
- Laeva ejus sub capite meo* (4)
- Lapidabant Stephanum (1)
- Manifesto vobis veritatem. Pax vobis, noli timere (3)
- Memor esto verbi tui servo tuo (2)
- Nigra sum, sed formosa* (4)
- O admirabile commercium (1)
- O Antoni eremita (1)
- O beata et gloriosa Trinitas. O vera summa sempiterna Trinitas (1)
- O beatum pontificem (1)
- O beatum virum (1)
- O lux et decus. O singulare praesidium (3)
- Omnipotens sempiterne Deus (3)
- O quam metuendus (3)
- Orietur stella (4)
- O sacrum convivium (2)
- O sancte praesul Nicolae. Gaude praesul optime (3)
- Osculetur me osculo oris sui* (4)
- O Virgo simul et Mater (2)
- Parce mihi Domine. Peccavi, peccavi (4)
- Pater noster (3)
- Paucitas dierum meorum. Manus tuae Domine (4)
- Peccantem me quotidie (2)
- Puer qui natus est (1)
- Pulchra es amica mea* (4)
- Pulchrae sunt genae tuae* (4)
- Quae est ista* (4)
- Quam pulchra es et quam decora* (4)
- Quam pulchri sunt gressus (1)
- Quam pulchri sunt gressus tui* (4)
- Quid habes Hester. Vidi te Domine (3)
- Quodcumque ligaveris (6)
- Rex Melchior (4)
- Salve Regina. Eia ergo advocata (4)
- Sancte Paule apostole (1)
- Sanctificavit Dominus (3)
- Senex puerum portabat. Hodie beata virgo Maria (1)
- Sic Deus dilexit mundum (4)
- Sicut lilium inter spinas (1)
- Sicut lilium inter spinas* (4)
- Si ignoras te, o pulchra inter mulieres* (4)
- Stella quam viderant magi (1)
- Surgam et circuibo civitatem* (4)
- Surge amica mea, speciosa mea* (4)
- Surge Petre (4)
- Surge, propera amica mea* (4)
- Surge sancte Dei. Ambula sancte Dei (4)
- Suscipe verbum virgo Maria. Paries quidem filium (1)
- Tempus est, ut revertar. Nisi ego abiero (4)
- Tota pulchra es, amica mea* (4)
- Tradent enim vos (3)
- Trahe me post te* (4)
- Tribulationes civitatum. Peccavimus (4)
- Tu es pastor ovium (6)
- Unus ex duobus (1)
- Venit Michael Archangelus (1)
- Veni, veni dilecte me* (4)
- Videns secundus (4)
- Vineam meam non custodivi* (4)
- Vox dilecti mei* (4)
- Vulnerasti cor meum* (4)

=== Six voices ===
- Accepit Jesus calicem (3)
- Assumpta est Maria (6)
- Beata Barbara. Gloriosam mortem (2)
- Cantabo Domino in vita mea. Deficiant peccatores (2)
- Columna es immobilis (3)
- Congratulamini mihi [not in Complete Works]
- Cum autem esset Stephanus (6)
- Cum inducerent puerum Jesum (6)
- Cum ortus fuerit (3)
- Deus qui ecclesiam tuam (3)
- Dum complerentur dies pentecostes. Dum ergo essent in unum discipuli (1)
- Eia ergo, advocata nostra (7)
- Haec dies, quam fecit Dominus (3)
- Hic est beatissimus Evangelista (6)
- Hic est discipulus ille (6)
- Hierusalem, cito veniet salus tua. Ego enim sum Dominus (2)
- Judica me, Deus, et discerne (3)
- O bone Jesu (3)
- O Domine Jesu Christe (1)
- O magnum mysterium. Quem vidistis pastores (1)
- Positis autem genibus (6)
- Pulchra es, o Maria virgo (1)
- Quae est ista (6)
- Responsum accepit Simeon (6)
- Rex pacificus (3)
- Salve Regina, mater misericordiae (7)
- Sancta et immaculata Virginitas. Benedicta tu (2)
- Solve jubente Deo. Quodcunque ligaveris (1)
- Susanna ab improbis. Postquam autem (3)
- Tradent enim vos in conciliis (6)
- Tribularer si nescirem. Secundum multitudinem dolorum (2)
- Tu es Petrus. Quodcunque ligaveris (2)
- Veni Domine et noli tardare. Excita Domine (2)
- Vidi turbam magnam. Et omnes angeli stabant (1)
- Viri Galilaei quid statis. Ascendit Deus in jubilatione (1)

=== Seven voices ===
- Tu es Petrus (1)
- Virgo prudentissima. Maria virgo (1)

=== Eight voices ===
- Alma Redemptoris Mater (6)
- Alma Redemptoris Mater (7)
- Apparuit gratia Dei (7)
- Ave Maria, gratia plena (6)
- Ave mundi spes, Maria (6)
- Ave Regina coelorum (3)
- Ave Regina coelorum (7)
- Beata es, virgo Maria (6)
- Caro mea vere est cibus (6)
- Confitebor tibi Domine. Notas facite in populis (2)
- Congratulamini mihi onmes (7)
- Dies sanctificatus illuxit nobis (7)
- Disciplinam et sapientiam docuit (6)
- Domine in virtute tua. Magna est gloria ejus (2)
- Ecce veniet dies illa (7)
- Etenim Pascha nostrum (6)
- Et increpavit eos dicens (6)
- Expurgate vetus fermentum (6)
- Fili, non te fragant labores (7)
- Fratres, ego enim accepi (6)
- Haec dies, quam fecit Dominus (7)
- Haec est dies praeclara (7)
- Hic est panis (6)
- Hodie Christus natus est (3)
- Hodie gloriosa semper virgo Maria (6)
- Jesus junxit se discipulis (6)
- Jubilate Deo (3)
- Lauda Sion Salvatorem (3)
- Lauda Sion Salvatorem (7)
- Laudate Dominum in sanctis (30)
- Laudate Dominum omnes gentes (2)
- Laudate pueri Dominum. Quis sicut Dominus Deus (2)
- Magnus sanctus Paulus (7)
- Nunc dimittis servum tuum (7)
- O admirabile commercium (7)
- O bone Jesu, exaudi me (6)
- O Domine Jesu Christe (6)
- Omnes gentes plaudite (7)
- O pretiosum et admirandum convivium (7)
- O quam suavis est, Domine, spiritus tuus (6)
- Pater noster, qui es in coelis (6)
- Regina coeli, laetare (6)
- Regina mundi, hodie (6)
- Salve Regina, mater misericordiae (6)
- Sancte Paule Apostole (7)
- Spiritus Sanctus replevit (6)
- Stabat Mater dolorosa (6)
- Sub tuum praesidium (6)
- Surge illuminare Hierusalem (3). Et ambulabant gentes in lumine (6)
- Surrexit pastor bonus (6)
- Tria sunt munera pretiosa (7)
- Veni Sancte Spiritus (3)
- Veni Sancte Spiritus (7)
- Victimae Paschali laudes (7)
- Videntes stellam Magi (7)
- Vos amici mei estis (30)

=== Twelve voices ===
- Ecce nunc benedicite Dominum (7)
- Laudate Dominum in tympanis (7)
- Laudate nomen ejus (26)
- Nunc dimittis servum tuum (7)
- O quam bonus et suavis (26)
- Stabat Mater dolorosa (7) (attributed by some writers to Felice Anerio)

== Hymns for four voices ==
(All in Volume 8)

- Ad coenam Agni providi
- Ad preces nostras
- A solis ortu cardine
- Aurea luce
- Ave maris stella
- Christe qui lux es
- Christe Redemptor omnium (2 settings)
- Conditor alme siderum
- Decus morum dux
- Deus tuorum militum (2 settings)
- Doctor egregie
- En gratulemur hodie
- Exultet coelum laudibus
- Hostis Herodes impie
- Hujus obtentu
- Hymnus canoris
- Iste confessor
- Jesu corona virginum (2 settings)
- Jesu nostra redemptio
- Lauda mater ecclesiae
- Laudibus summis
- Lucis creator optime
- Magne pater Augustine
- Mensis Augusti
- Nunc jurat celsi
- O lux beata Trinitas
- Pange lingua gloriosi
- Petrus beatus
- Prima lux surgens
- Proles de coelo prodiit
- Quicumque Christum Quærtis
- Quodcumque vinclis
- Rex gloriose martyrum
- Salvete flores martyrum
- Sanctorum meritis
- Tibi Christe, splendor patris
- Tristes erant apostoli
- Urbs beata Jerusalem
- Ut queant laxis
- Veni Creator Spiritus
- Vexilla Regis prodeunt (2 settings)

== Offertories for five voices ==
(All in Volume 9)

- Ad te, Domine, levavi
- Afferentur regi virgines
- Angelus Domini descendit
- Anima nostra sicut
- Ascendit Deus in jubilatione
- Assumpta est Maria
- Ave Maria, gratia plena
- Benedicam Dominum
- Benedicite gentes
- Benedictus Domine
- Benedictus sit Deus
- Benedixisti Domine
- Bonum est confiteri
- Confessio et pulchritudo
- Confirma hoc Deus
- Confitebor tibi Domine
- Confitebuntur coeli
- Constitues eos principes
- De profundis
- Deus conversus
- Deus enim firmavit
- Deus meus ad te
- Dextera domini fecit
- Diffusa est gratia
- Domine convertere
- Domine Deus, in simplicitate
- Domine in auxilium
- Elegerunt apostoli
- Exaltabo te Domine
- Expectans expectavi
- Illumina oculos meos
- Immittet angelus
- Improperium expectavit
- In omnem terram exivit
- In te speravi
- Inveni David
- Jubilate Deo omnis
- Jubilate Deo universa
- Justitiae Domine rectae (2 settings)
- Justorum animae
- Justus ut palma (2 settings)
- Laetamini in Domino
- Lauda anima mea
- Laudate Dominum quia
- Meditabor in mandatis
- Mihi autem nimis
- Oravi ad Dominum
- Perfice gressus meos
- Populum humilem
- Posuisti Domine
- Precatus est Moyses
- Recordare mei
- Reges Tharsis et insulae
- Sacerdotes Domini
- Sanctificavit Moyses
- Scapulis suis
- Si ambulavero
- Sicut in holocaustis
- Sperent in te omnes
- Stetit angelus
- Super flumina Babylonis
- Terra tremuit
- Tu es Petrus
- Tui sunt coeli
- Veritas mea
- Vir erat in terra

== Lamentations ==
All in Volume 25. There are 4 settings: (1) for 4 and 5 voices, (2) for 3, 4, 5, 6, and 8 voices, (3) for 3, 4, 5, and 6 voices, and (4) for 3, 4, 5, and 6 voices.

- Incipit lamentatio Jeremiae Prophetae. Aleph. Quomodo sedet.
- Vau. Et egressus est a filia Sion.
- Jod. Manum suam misit hostis.
- De lamentatione Jeremiae Prophetae. Heth. Cogitavit.
- Lamed. Matribus suis dixerunt.
- Aleph. Ego vir.
- De lamentatione Jeremiae Prophetae. Heth. Misericordiae Domini.
- Aleph. Quomodo obscuratum est aurum.
- Incipit oratio Jeremiae Prophetae.

== Litanies ==
(All in Volume 26)

- Litaniae de B. Virgine Maria inest Ave Maria (3 and 4 voices)
- Litaniae de B. Virgine Maria (5 voices)
- Litaniae de B. Virgine Maria (6 voices)
- Litaniae de B. Virgine Maria (8 voices; 2 settings)
- Litaniae deiparae Virginis inest Ave Maria (4 voices)
- Litaniae Domini (8 voices; 3 settings)
- Litaniae Sacrosanctae Eucharistiae (8 voices; 2 settings)

== Psalms ==
(All in Volume 26)

- Ad te levavi oculos meos (Ps. 122)
- Beati omnes, qui timent Dominum (Ps. 127)
- Domine, quis habitabit (Ps. 14)
- Jubilate Deo omnis terra (Ps. 99)

== Antiphon ==
- Salve Regina (4, 8, and 12 voices)

== Magnificats ==
(All in Volume 27)

- First tone (5 settings)
- Second tone (4 settings)
- Third tone (4 settings), including a melody widely used today in the resurrection hymn tune, Victory (The Strife Is O'er)
- Fourth tone (5 settings)
- Fifth tone (5 settings)
- Sixth tone (4 settings)
- Seventh tone (4 settings)
- Eighth tone (4 settings)

== Cantiones sacrae ==
(All in Volume 30)

- Benedictus Dominus Deus (4 voices)
- Illumina oculos (doubtful; 3 voices)
- In Domino laetabitur (doubtful; 4 voices)
- Laudate Dominum in sanctis (8 voices)
- Miserere mei, Deus (4 voices)
- O quam suavis est (4 voices)
- Vos amici mei estis (8 voices)

== Spiritual madrigals ==
=== Three voices ===
- Jesu, Rex admirabilis (30)
- Tua Jesu dilectio (30)
- Jesu, sommo conforto (not included)
- Rex virtutem (not included)

=== Four voices ===
- Jesu, flos matris (30)

=== Five voices ===
(All in Volume 29)

- Al fin, madre di Dio
- Amor, senza il tuo dono
- Anzi, se foco e ferro
- Cedro gentil
- Città di Dio
- Dammi, scala del ciel
- Dammi, vermiglia rosa
- Dunque divin Spiracolo
- E con i raggi tuoi
- E dal letto
- Ed arda ornor
- Eletta Mirra
- E quella certa speme
- E questo spirto
- E, se fur gia
- E, se il pensier
- E, se mai voci
- E, se nel foco
- E tua mercè
- E tu, anima mia
- E tu Signor
- Fa, che con l' acque tue
- Figlio immortal
- Giammai non resti
- Ma so ben, Signor
- Non basta ch' una volta
- Novella Aurora
- O cibo di dolcezza
- O Jesu dolce
- O manna saporito
- O refrigerio acceso
- Orto che sei si chiuso
- Orto sol, che
- O solo incoronato
- Paraclito amoroso
- Per questo, Signor mio
- Quanto più t' offend' io
- Regina delle vergini
- Santo Altare
- Se amarissimo fiele
- Signor, dammi scienza
- S' io non ti conoscessi
- Specchio che fosti
- Spirito santo, Amore
- Tu di fortezza torre
- Tu sei soave fiume
- Vello di Gedeon
- Vergine bella
- Vergine chiara
- Vergine pura
- Vergine, quante lagrime
- Vergine saggia
- Vergine santa
- Vergine sola al mondo
- Vergine, tale è terra
- Vincitrice de l' empia idra

== Secular madrigals ==
(All in Volume 28)

- Ahi che quest' occhi
- Alla riva del Tebro
- Amor, ben puoi
- Amor, che meco
- Amor, Fortuna
- Amor, quando fioria
- Ardo lungi
- Beltà, se com'
- Che debbo far
- Che non fia
- Chiara, sì chiaro
- Chi dunque fia
- Chi estinguera
- Com' in più negre
- Così la fama
- Così le chiome
- Da così dotta man sei
- Deh! fuss' or
- Deh or foss' io
- Dido chi giace
- Dolor non fu
- Donna bell' e gentil
- Donna gentil
- Donna, vostra mercede
- Ecc' oscurati
- Ecc' ove giunse
- Eran le vostre lagrime
- Febbre, ond' or
- Fu l' ardor grave
- Già fu chi m' ebbe cara
- Gioia m'abond'
- Gitene liete rime
- Godete dunque
- Il dolce sonno
- Il tempo vola
- Io dovea ben
- Io felice sarei
- Io sento qui d' intorno
- Io son ferito
- I vaghi fiori
- Ivi vedrai
- La cruda mia
- La ver l' aurora
- Le selv' avea
- Lontan dalla mia diva
- Mai fù più cruda
- Ma voi, fioriti
- Mentre a le dolci
- Mentre ch' al mar
- Mirate altrove
- Morì quasi il mio core
- Nè spero
- Nessun visse giammai
- Non son le vostre mani
- O bella Ninfa
- O che splendor
- Ogni beltà
- Ogni loco
- Oh! felici ore
- O me felice
- Onde seguendo
- Ovver de' sensi
- Partomi donna
- Perchè s' annida
- Per mostrar gioia
- Pero contento
- Placide l' acque
- Poscia che
- Pose un gran foco
- Prima vedransi
- Prima vedrassi
- Privo di fede
- Quai rime
- Quando dal terzo cielo
- Quando fe loro
- Queste saranno
- Questo doglioso
- Rara beltà
- Rime, dai sospir
- Saggio e santo pastor
- Se ben non veggon
- Se di pianti
- Se fra quest' erb'
- Se lamentar
- Se 'l pensier
- Se non fusse il pensier
- Si è debile il filo
- S' i' 'l dissi mai
- Soave fia il morir
- Struggomi
- S' un sguardo
- Vaghi pensier
- Vedrassi prima
- Veramente in amore
- Vestiva i colli

== Cantiones profanae ==
(All in Volume 30)

- Amor, se pur sei dio (4 voices)
- Anima, dove sei (5 voices)
- Chiare, fresche, e dolci acque (4 voices)
- Con dolce, altiero ed amoroso cenno (4 voices)
- Da fuoco così bel (4 voices)
- Donna, presso al cui viso (5 voices)
- Dunque perfido amante (5 voices)
- Il caro è morto (5 voices)
- Non fu già suon di trombe (5 voices)
- Quand', ecco, donna (5 voices)
- Se dai soavi accenti (4 voices)
- Voi mi poneste in fuoco (4 voices)

== Other ==
There are also works ascribed to Palestrina in the archives of the Julian Chapel, from the archives of the Pontifical Chapel, from the Vatican Library, from the archives of St. John Lateran, from the archives of Santa Maria Maggiore, from the library of the Roman College, and various other collections, included in Volumes 30, 31 and 32. Many of these, however, are considered doubtful or spurious.
