= Missa L'homme armé =

Over 40 settings of the Ordinary of the Mass using the tune L'homme armé survive from the period between 1450 and the end of the 17th century, making the tune the most popular single source from the period on which to base an imitation mass.

Some of the Missae L'homme armé are as follows:

Probably dating from the 1450s:

- Missa L'homme armé (Antoine Busnois)
- Missa L'homme armé (Guillaume Dufay)
- Missa L'homme armé (Johannes Regis) (two: one lost)
- Missa L'homme armé (Johannes Ockeghem)
- Missa L'homme armé (Guillaume Faugues) (two)

Probably written before 1475:

- Missa L'homme armé (Johannes Tinctoris)
- Missa L'homme armé (Firminus Caron)
- Missa L'homme armé (Cycle of six masses, from an anonymous manuscript from Naples)

Probably written before 1500:

- Missa L'homme armé (Mathurin Forestier)
- Missa L'homme armé (Jacob Obrecht)
- Missa L'homme armé super voces musicales (Josquin des Prez)
- Missa L'homme armé sexti toni (Josquin des Prez)
- Missa L'homme armé (Loyset Compère)
- Missa L'homme armé (Bertrandus Vaqueras)
- Missa L'homme armé (Philippe Basiron)
- Missa L'homme armé (Antoine Brumel)
- Missa L'homme armé (Marbrianus de Orto)

Written after 1500:

- Missa L'homme armé (Robert Carver)
- Missa L'homme armé (Matthaeus Pipelare)
- Missa L'homme armé (Pierre de la Rue) (two)
- Missa L'homme armé (Cristóbal Morales) (two)
- Missa L'homme armé (Francisco de Peñalosa)
- Missa L'homme armé (Andreas de Silva)
- Missa L'homme armé (Vitalis Venedier)
- Missa L'homme armé (Francisco Guerrero) (two)
- Missa L'homme armé (Ludwig Senfl)
- Missa L'homme armé (Palestrina) (two)
- Missa L'homme armé (Giacomo Carissimi)

== More recent L'homme armé works ==
- Peter Maxwell Davies who wrote Missa super l'homme armé (1968, rev. 1971; for male or female speaker or singer and ensemble)
- The Armed Man: A Mass for Peace by Karl Jenkins
- Helmut Eder Organ Concerto on L'homme armé
- Paulo Costa Lima who wrote Atotô do L'homme armé para Orquestra de Câmara op. 39 (1993)
- Christopher Marshall (composer) L'homme armé: Variations for Wind Ensemble
- Margaret Sandresky Organ Mass "L'homme armé" (1979)
