= John Regis =

John Regis may refer to:

- Johannes Regis (c.1425–c.1496), Franco-Flemish composer of the Renaissance
- John Francis Regis S.J. (1597–1640), French preacher recognized as a saint by the Roman Catholic Church
- John Regis (athlete) (born 1966), English retired athlete
