= Sound and Fury =

Sound and Fury may refer to:

== Books ==
- "Sound and fury", a line from the "Tomorrow and tomorrow and tomorrow" soliloquy in William Shakespeare's Macbeth
- The Sound and the Fury, William Faulkner

== Film and TV ==
- Sound and Fury (1988 film), French film directed by Jean-Claude Brisseau
- Sound and Fury (2000 film), documentary on deaf children and cochlear implants
- Sound & Fury, a 2019 Netflix anime film that was made to accompany Sound & Fury (Sturgill Simpson album)
- The Sound and the Fury (1959 film), American drama film directed by Martin Ritt. It is loosely based on the 1929 novel of the same name by William Faulkner
- The Sound and the Fury (2014 film), American drama film directed by James Franco. It is the second film version of the 1929 novel of the same name
- "Sound and Fury", the tenth episode of the first season of Transformers: Animated

== Music ==
- "Sound & Fury", the name of Edward Vesala's ensemble.
- The Sound and The Fury (vocal ensemble), project of tenor John Potter
- Sound & Fury (1982 Youth Brigade album)
- Sound & Fury (1983 Youth Brigade album)
- Sound & Fury (Sturgill Simpson album) 2019
- The Sound and the Fury (album) by British singer-songwriter Nerina Pallot 2015

== See also ==
- The Sound and the Fury (disambiguation)
- The Sound of Fury (disambiguation)
