= The Sound and the Fury (disambiguation) =

The Sound and the Fury is a 1929 novel by American author William Faulkner.

The Sound and the Fury may also refer to:

== In film and television ==
- The Sound and the Fury (1959 film), a 1959 film adaptation of Faulkner's novel
- The Sound and the Fury (2014 film), a 2014 film adaptation of the novel
- "The Sound and the Fury" (The Flash), an episode of The Flash

== In music ==
- The Sound and The Fury (vocal ensemble), an English-German vocal group performing renaissance polyphony
- The Sound and the Fury, a musical composition by Robert W. Smith
- The Sound and the Fury, a 2011 compilation album by Billy Fury
- The Sound and the Fury (album), a 2015 studio album by Nerina Pallot

== In sports ==
- Muhammad Ali vs. Bob Foster, a heavyweight boxing match billed as The Sound and the Fury
- Evander Holyfield vs. Mike Tyson II, a heavyweight boxing championship match billed as The Sound and the Fury

== See also ==
- Sound and Fury (disambiguation)
- The Sound of Fury (disambiguation)
