= The Sound and The Fury (vocal ensemble) =

The Sound and the Fury (founded 2005) is an Anglo-German vocal group convening in Brixen and Vienna, specialising entirely in performance of renaissance polyphony of the Franco-Flemish school.

The core members of the group are Thomas E. Bauer (baritone) of Regensburg, whose earlier ensemble Vokalsolisten Ratisbona was the genesis of the ensemble, John Potter (tenor), and Richard Wistreich (bass), supplemented by other singers. The line up of performers on the ensemble's first 2005 recording of Gombert included Ulrike Hofbauer (soprano), David Erler (alto), Hubert Nettinger (tenor), Jason Darnell (tenor), Christof Hartkopf (baritone).

== Discography ==
Vokalsolisten Ratisbona - the earlier group led by Thomas E. Bauer

- Media Vita, Intabolatura di Balli. Vokalsolisten Ratisbona - Thomas E. Bauer, Luca Scandali, Mauro Occhionero. ORF 333 (2 CDs)
- Musik aus Brixen - Christoph Sätzl (1593-1655), Johann Stadlmayr (c.1575-1648), Johann Jakob Walther. Vokalsolisten Ratisbona, Thomas E. Bauer. ORF 301 (2 CDs)

The Sound and the Fury - Paradise regained series for ORF (continued on FRA BERNARDO)

- Firminus Caron 1. Missa "L'homme armé". Missa "Accueilly m'a la belle" ORF 3057 live SACD (2008)
- Firminus Caron Complete Masses & Chansons, fra bernardo fb 1207302
- Guillaume Faugues 1. Missa "Le Serviteur" Missa "Je suis en la mer" ORF 3025 SACD
- Guillaume Faugues 2. Missa "L'homme armé" . Missa "Vinus vina vinum" ORF 3115 live 2 CDs (2009)
- Nicolas Gombert 1. Missa "Quam pulchra es". 5 Motets. ORF 463 live (2005)
- Nicolas Gombert 2. Missa "Sur tous regretz". 7 Motets, ORF 3006 live (2006)
- Nicolas Gombert 3. 12 motets a 4,5. ORF 3077
- Jakob Obrecht 1. Missa "Rosa playsante". Missa "Fortuna desperata" ORF 3048 live 2 CDs (2008)
- Jakob Obrecht Missa "Salve Diva Parens", Salve Regina à 6. Fra Bernardo 2308441 (2023)
- Johannes Ockeghem 1. Missa "L'Homme armé". Missa "Prolationum" ORF 3024 2009
- Johannes Ockeghem 2. Missa "Ecce Ancilla Domini". Missa "My my" ORF 3130 live 2010
- Johannes Ockeghem Missa cuiusvis toni, Missa prolationum, fra bernardo fb 1302202
- Marbrianus de Orto Missa "Mi-Mi", Missa "L'homme armé" Fra Bernardo 6001222 (2014)
- Matthaeus Pipelare 1. Four masses. Fra Bernardo 1309202 (2014)
- Johannes Prioris Missa "de angelis", Missa "Tant bel mi sont pensade" Fra Bernardo "FIN" 2329131 (2023)
- Pierre de La Rue 1. Missa "Ave Sanctissima Maria", Missa O salutaris Hostia à 4, ORF 3094
- Pierre de La Rue Four masses. Fra Bernardo 1810455 (2018)
