= Missa brevis (disambiguation) =

A missa brevis is a shorter musical mass composition.

Missa brevis may also refer to:

- Kyrie–Gloria masses, BWV 233–236, masses by Johann Sebastian Bach
- Mass for the Dresden court (Bach), BWV 232 I (early version), composed in 1733 by Johann Sebastian Bach
- Missa in D minor, BR E2, Fk 98, a mass by Wilhelm Friedemann Bach
- Missa in G minor, BR E1, Fk 100, a mass by Wilhelm Friedemann Bach
- Missa super cantilena "Allein Gott in der Höh' sei Ehr", a mass by Johann Ludwig Bach
- Missa Brevis (Bernstein), a 1989 work by Leonard Bernstein
- Missa Brevis (Britten), a 1959 work by Benjamin Britten
- Missa brevis (Nystedt), a 1984 work by Knut Nystedt
- Missa Brevis (Palestrina), a 1570 work by Giovanni Pierluigi da Palestrina

== See also ==
- Bach's church music in Latin#Separate movements, copies, and arrangements
- List of masses by Wolfgang Amadeus Mozart
