= Loire Valley chansonniers =

Group of songbooks

The Loire Valley chansonniers are a related group of songbooks copied in the Loire Valley region of central France c. 1465-c. 1475 and produced in the context of the French royal court. They consist of six chansonniers: Copenhagen, Dijon, Nivelle, Laborde, Leuven and Wolfenbüttel. The songbooks, smaller than a modern paperback, personalized and lavishly decorated, are the earliest surviving examples of a new genre which offered a combination of words, music, and illuminations.

== History ==
The chansonniers of the late 15th century were objects of leisure, offering artistic, musical and textual aspects to form a multidimensional reading experience. Prior to the 1470s, words were written first by scribes, and then musical symbols were aligned to them. But in the 1470s, melodies were set out first, followed by their words, but not in systematic alignment, only in proximity. The books contain secular vernacular songs in three or four voice parts with text that drew upon the poetic tradition of courtly love, written by composers that were active in the Loire Valley region at approximately the same time. Each voice part is introduced by decorated initials. Out of a total 273 songs, 107 are songs surviving in just one source.

Two of the chansonniers (Dijon and Laborde), have quasi-alphabetical indexes. Unlike those of Antoine Busnois, Firminus Caron's songs are poorly represented in the Loire Valley chansonniers. Of the two song attributed to Josquin des Prez, one is "Adieu mes amours".

== Chansonniers ==
The Chansonnier Nivelle de la Chaussée is located at the Bibliothèque nationale de France in Paris. It contains many small-scale corrections and crossed-out notes which gives insight into its principal scribe as well as several instances of large-scale erasures, post-binding, where entire voice parts were erased. Seven works of the composer Johannes Delahaye appear in it. It is widely accepted as being the earliest of the group.

The Dijon Chansonnier is located in the Bibliothèque municipale de Dijon. The composers are Barbiguant, Gilles Binchois, Busnois, Caron, Compere, Convert, Delahaye, Guillaume Dufay, Hayne van Ghizeghem, Jean Molinet, Robert Morton, Johannes Ockeghem, and Johannes Tinctoris.

The Laborde Chansonnier contains over a hundred songs by Binchois, Busnois, Dufay, Ockeghem and others. Many of the songs are unique and the pages are illustrated. The songbook first came to scholarly attention in 1857 at the "Comité de la langue, de l'histoire et des arts de la France", the manuscript having been presented by a Comité member, count Léon de Laborde, and having been sent to the Comité by L'abbé Jacques-Rémi-Antoine Texier. In 2011, Goldberg Stiftung made available their transcription of it in both modern and original clefs. It was the last to receive close musicological attention.

The Copenhagen Chansonnier is a parchment manuscript containing 33 three-voiced songs from the late 15th century; one song, "Lactens secours", which was added in the 16th century; as well as modulation essays. It has been characterized as the perhaps most valuable medieval manuscript of music in the Royal Danish Library.

The Wolfenbüttel Chansonnier Codex Guelf 287 Extrav is related to the Laborde Chansonnier. It is located at the Herzog August Library in Wolfenbüttel, Germany.
