= Dorothea Anne Franchi =

New Zealand composer and harpist

- Born: 17 February 1920
- Died: 22 August 2003 (aged 83)
- Occupation: Music composer

Dorothea Anne Franchi (17 February 1920 – 22 August 2003) was a New Zealand pianist, harpist, music educator and composer.

== Early life and education ==
Franchi was born in Auckland, New Zealand, in 1920, the daughter of Peter Rudolph and Gertrude Franchi. She studied at the Auckland Teachers College and the University of Auckland, where she graduated BMus in 1939. She then went to the Royal College of Music in London in 1948. She studied harp, composition and piano accompaniment.

== Career ==
Franchi taught music at Epsom Girls' Grammar School in Auckland before going to study in London. From 1953 to 1958 she took the position of musical director and pianist for the newly formed New Zealand Ballet Company, working with Poul Gnatt. She had a successful career as a pianist and harpist, and her works are performed internationally.

== Honours and awards ==
- Lionel Tertis Prize for Viola Rhapsody, 1950
- Philip Neill Memorial Prize, 1947
- The Composers Association of New Zealand KBB Citation for Services to New Zealand Music, 2000

== Works ==
Franchi composed for orchestra, chamber ensemble, voice and instrumental performance. Selected works include:

- A Man of Life Upright for bass and piano
- A Wet Night in Greymouth for voice and piano
- Abel Tasman for voice, piccolo, piano and drum
- Apple-Picking Time for voice and piano
- Concertino for harmonica, harp and strings
- Do-Wack-A-Do (1956) – orchestral suite from the ballet of the same name
- El Bailador Inamorado song cycle for tenor and piano
- Eventide for tenor, string quartet and piano
- Four Pioneer Portraits (1949) – cycle of four songs for mezzo-soprano and piano based on poems by Robin Hyde, Eileen Duggan and Louis Esson
- God Bless You Boy for voice and piano
