= The Sound of Fury =

The Sound of Fury may refer to:

- The Sound of Fury (album), the 1960 debut album by Billy Fury
- The Sound of Fury (film), a 1950 film starring Frank Lovejoy and Kathleen Ryan

== See also ==
- Sound and Fury (disambiguation)
- The Sound and the Fury (disambiguation)
