= Philip Neill Memorial Prize =

The Philip Neill Memorial Prize is an annual award administered by the University of Otago for excellence in original composition. The prize is open to all current and former students of a university in New Zealand, except previous winners who are excluded for a period of five years.

It was established in 1943 in memory of Philip Foster Neill, a medical student at the University of Otago who died during the 1943 polio outbreak. In the first year of the prize, in 1944, the task was to compose a prelude (or fantasia) and fugue for either piano or organ. Douglas Lilburn received the inaugural £25 prize on 25 June 1944, with Harry Luscombe of Auckland as the runner-up. It is the longest continuously running award of its kind in New Zealand.

Each year, the winner is determined through a set composition task with different parameters, usually relating to duration and instrumentation. These are announced early in the year, with submissions due at the beginning of July. The prize is not awarded every year.

== List of award recipients ==
- 1944 Douglas Lilburn for Prelude and Fugue in G Minor for organ
- 1945 Harry Luscombe for Sonata in G major for violin and piano
- 1946 Frank Callaway for Theme and Variations for String Orchestra
- 1947 tied between Dorothy Scott for In a younger Land, a song cycle for mezzo-soprano and violin, cello and piano and Dorothea Anne Franchi for The Desolate Star a song cycle for baritone and piano setting text by Robin Hyde
- 1948 John Ritchie for Passacaglia and fugue on an original theme for two pianos
- 1949 Charles Martin for Sonata for pianoforte and violin
- 1950 Claire Neale for Variations on an original theme in the phyrgian mode, with a ground bass finale
- 1951 Georgina Smith for Theme and Variations [for two pianos]
- 1952 Leslie Pearce Williamson Jordan for Fantasy-sonata for cello and piano
- 1953 No award
- 1954 Nigel Eastgate
- 1955, 1956, 1957 No award
- 1958 Barry Vercoe for A Program Suite for Oboe, Clarinet and Bassoon
- 1959 Dorothy Freed for Variations for woodwind quintet and Philip Hodgson
- 1960, 1961 No award
- 1962 shared between Robin Maconie for Basia Memoranda for lyric tenor and string quartet and Graham Hollobon for Elegy, a song cycle setting text by Alastair Campbell
- 1963 William Southgate for Toccata for Brass Choir and Jenny McLeod
- 1964 No award
- 1965 Jack Body for Cantata for the festival of dedication of a church
- 1966 William Hawkey
- 1967, 1968 No award
- 1969 Noel Sanders
- 1970 Gillian Bibby for Sanctuary of the Spirits, a children's opera,
- 1971 John Rimmer for Composition 2
- 1972 Christopher Norton
- 1973, 1974, 1975, 1976, 1977 No award
- 1978 David Hamilton for Canticle 1 for oboe, baritone and piano.
- 1979 Peter Adams for Sings Daphne for Soprano, Clarinet and Piano
- 1980 John Ritchie for Three Housman Songs
- 1981 No award
- 1982 Helen Caskie for Rhapsody for violin and piano
- 1983 No award
- 1984 Richard Francis for Song-cycle (Auden) for Baritone and Pianoforte
- 1985 Nigel Keay for Variations for piano
- 1986 No award
- 1987 Eve de Castro-Robinson for Undercurrents for solo clarinet
- 1988, 1989, 1990 No award
- 1991 Maria Grenfell for A Pinch of time; five songs for bass-baritone and piano setting poems by Hone Tuwhare, Kevin Ireland and Allen Curnow
- 1992 John Elmsly for Songs from 'The Treehouse' for SATB choir
- 1993 Eve de Castro-Robinson for Split the Lark for violin and piano
- 1994 Tecwyn Evans for Gerauschvoll for organ
- 1995 Christopher Marshall for Three Aspects of Spring
- 1995 Dorothy Buchanan for Fragments and Letters for voice, clarinet and piano.
- 1996 Cheryl Camm for Three Burns Songs for Soprano, Clarinet and Cello
- 1996 Michael Norris
- 1997 David Farquhar for Prospero
- 1998 No award
- 1999 Jeroen Speak for Etudes.
- 2000 Leonie Holmes for A Tedious Brief Scene: Bottom's Dance for mixed chamber ensemble of nine players
- 2001 No award
- 2002 Thorsten Wollman for Fishes and Birds for flute or violin, clarinet and piano
- 2003 John Rimmer for Bowed Insights for string quartet
- 2004 Robin Toan for Maze for piano and two percussionists
- 2005 No award
- 2006 Carol Shortis for The Riddle of her flight
- 2007 Brian Bromberg
- 2008 Chris Adams for Persephone for String Quartet
- 2009 Jack Body for Mediations on Michelangelo
- 2010 No award
- 2011 Alex Campbell-Hunt for Piano Trio
- 2012 Corwin Newall for Scientists (Part 1)
- 2013 Kerian Veraine for Crave Release for violin and piano
- 2014 Linda Dallimore for Syria: In Empathy for oboe and piano
- 2015 Jeremy Mayall for Frosted Air Suite for flute and electronics
- 2016 Reuben Jelleyman for Soliloquy for Cello
- 2017 No award
- 2018 Corwin Newall for #babylife for piano duet
- 2019 Megan Kyte for Entends
- 2020 David Hamilton for Canticle 6: Fragments from Lorca for Mezzo, Violin and Piano, highly commended Chris Adams for Dowland Fragments for Mezzo, Violin and Piano
- 2021 Ben Hoadley for Four Preludes for cello and piano
