= Beverly Grigsby =

American composer, musicologist, and educator (1928–2022)

Beverly Grigsby (née Pinsky, January 11, 1928 – August 22, 2022) was an American composer, musicologist and electronic/computer music pioneer.

== Early life ==
Beverly Pinsky was born in Chicago, Illinois, and studied music and ballet as a child. She danced in Chicago Civic Opera's ballet chorus. She moved to California with her family at the age of 13 and graduated from Fairfax High School at age 16.

== Education ==
Grigsby entered the University of Southern California to study pre-med, and also studied composition with Ernst Krenek at the Southern California School of Music and the Arts. She earned Bachelor of Arts (in 1961) and Master of Arts (in 1963) degrees in composition from San Fernando Valley State College (now California State University, Northridge); upon graduation she was hired to teach at her alma mater. In 1971 she earned a Doctorate of Musical Arts in composition from the University of Southern California. She later studied computer music generation at Stanford University’s Center for Artificial Intelligence (CCRMA) and at M.I.T. in 1975-1976.

== Career ==
In 1962 she scored Francis Coppola's UCLA student film Ayamonn the Terrible with a music concrète score.

In 1963 Grigsby took a position teaching music at California State University, Northridge. With Krenek and Aurelio de la Vega, she established its Computer Music Studio. This was the first electronic music studio on the United States' west coast based at a university; other private studios had been established earlier by Ivor Darreg, John Robb, Henry Jacobs, Paul Beaver, and the San Francisco Tape Music Center. She taught theory, composition, and musicology there until her retirement in 1993. Her studio focused on analog synthesis, electronic music, and computer-generated music. Her studio was among the first to acquire a Synclavier and later a Fairlight CMI.

In 1984 Grigsby composed the first computerized opera score, for The Mask of Eleanor.

Along with Jeannie G. Pool, she founded the International Institute for the Study of Women in Music in 1985. She was heavily involved with the International Congress on Women in Music.

The 1994 Northridge earthquake destroyed her personal studio. After her retirement from CSU Northridge she continued to teach privately and work as a composer. She studied medieval and renaissance music in Solesmes Abbey, a site of major musicological interest in Gregorian chant due to Dom Prosper Guéranger's revival of the Benedictine Order and its original monastic traditions; this led to her being named a Getty Museum Research Scholar in 1997 and 1998.

Her music has been performed internationally.

== Death ==
Grigsby died on August 22, 2022, at the age of 94.

== Honors and awards ==
- The National Endowment for the Arts award in 1977.
- The Arts International (Rockefeller) Grant
- CSUN Distinguished Professor Award
- CSU Chancellor’s Maxi Grant
- IAWM Outstanding Music Contribution Award
- Annual ASCAP awards
- Carnegie Mellon Fellow in Technology (1987)
- Getty Museum Research Scholar (1997–98)
- Honorary board member of the Ernst Krenek Society

== Works ==
Grigsby has composed choral and chamber music, and also for film soundtracks and stage. She is noted for electroacoustic compositions. Selected works include:

- Songs on Shakespeare Texts for soprano and piano (1949)
- Awakening for mezzo-soprano and tape (1963)
- Two Faces of Janus for String Quartet (1963)
- score for Coppola's Ayamonn the Terrible (1964)
- Five Studies for Two Untransposed Hexachords for piano (1971)
- Love Songs for tenor and guitar (1974)
- Fragments from Augustine the Saint (1975) a monodrama based on St. Augustine's writings. For tenor, oboe, harp, and percussion.
- Dithyrambos for violin and cello (1975)
- A Little Background Music (1976), computer-generated, featured at the first International Computer Music Conference
- Movements for Guitar (1982)
- Shakti I (1983), a cycle for flute featuring traditional and non-traditional instruments, tape, lyrical melodies, and abstract sounds.
- The Mask of Eleanor (1984) chamber opera about Eleanor of Aquitaine for soprano and computer-generated music on tape, the first computer-generated opera. Premiered in 1984 at Théâtre le Ranelagh in Paris, as part of the 4th International Congress of Women in Music.
- Shakti II (1985) for soprano
- Occam's Razor, a Festival Overture, 1985. A computer-generated score for orchestra written in 1985 for Krenek's 85th birthday celebrations at UCSD. Generated on the Fairlight Computer Music Instrument. The sound of the double-basses were inspired by Bert Turetzky.
- score for Sight and Sound, a CSU production about computer music and graphics (1985)
- Vision of St. Joan for soprano and Fairlight CMI-generated score (1987), commissioned by the California chapter of the MTNA. Premiered in San Francisco by Deborah Kavasch.
- score for The Visitor, a Ray Bradbury adaptation by the Alexander Entertainment Group (1988)
- score for Certified Marble Industry, a production for marble industry (1988)
- score for CSU Chanellor Division of Information, a CSU production (1989)
- Shakti III (1989) for clarinet, tabla, and music generated on Fairlight III. Premiered by clarinettist William Powell, and dedicated to Powell's aunt.
- score for A is for Andromeda, a Ray Bradbury adaptation by the Alexander Entertainment Group (1990)
- several scores for Alexander Entertainment Group animanted films (1991-1992)
- Trio for Violin, B-flat Clarinet and Piano (1994)
- Spheres (1998), generated on Fairlight III Computer Music Instrument
- Saxsong (1998), written for Paul Wehage, premiered in 1998 in Italy
- Variations on L'homme armé (2005)
- Valse Langueur (2005)
- Valse Songeur (2005)
- Moses, incomplete opera
- Testimonies: The Retrial of Joan of Arc, incomplete opera

In a chapter she contributed to Judith Zaimont's book The Musical Woman: An International Perspective, 1983, Grigsby wrote the first survey of women in the field of electronic music.
