= Loire Valley =

Area of France

Coordinates: 47°12′59″N 0°03′44″E

The Loire Valley between Sully-sur-Loire and Chalonnes
UNESCO World Heritage Site
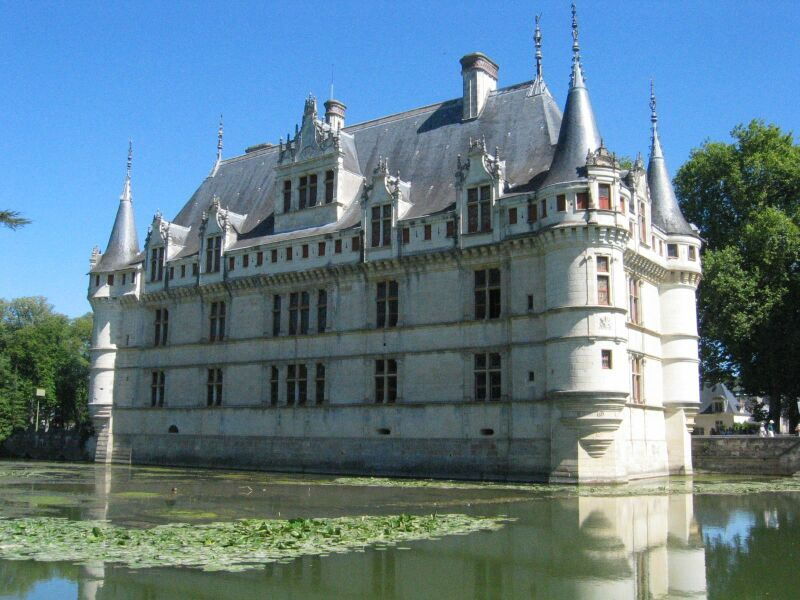
- Château d'Azay-le-Rideau
- Interactive map of The Loire Valley between Sully-sur-Loire and Chalonnes
- Location: France
- Criteria: Cultural: i, ii, iv
- Reference: 933bis
- Inscription: 2000 (24th Session)
- Area: 86,021 ha (212,560 acres)
- Buffer zone: 213,481 ha (527,520 acres)
- Limits of the World Heritage site: 1 = Sully-sur-Loire, 2 = Chalonnes-sur-Loire

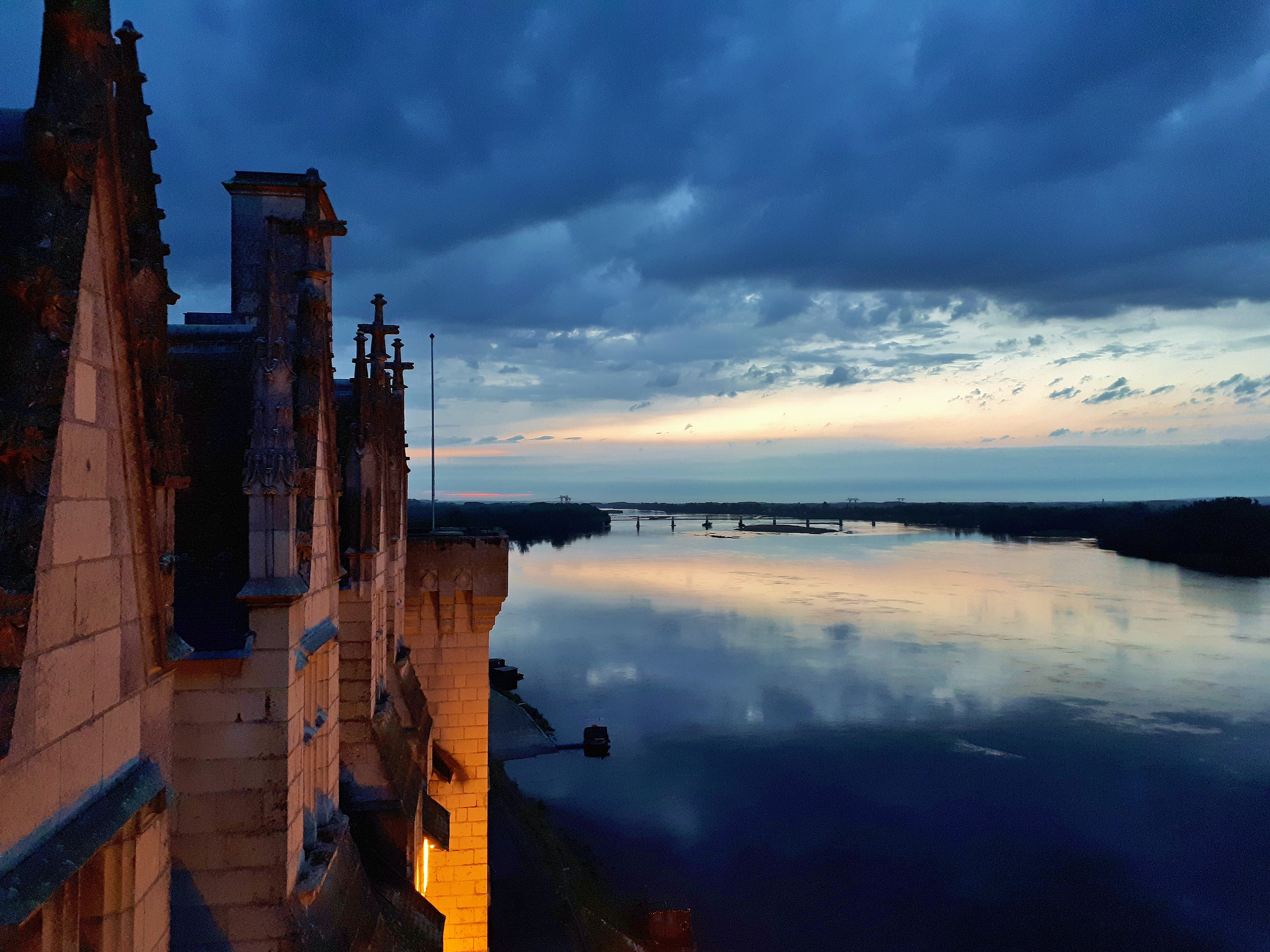
Sunset on the Loire River from the Château de Montsoreau-Museum of Contemporary Art

The Loire Valley (French: Val de Loire, pronounced [vale də la lwaʁ]), spanning 280 kilometres (170 mi), is a valley located in the middle stretch of the Loire river in central France, in both the administrative regions Pays de la Loire and Centre-Val de Loire. The area of the Loire Valley comprises about 800 square kilometres (310 sq mi). It is referred to as the Cradle of the French and the Garden of France due to the abundance of vineyards, fruit orchards (such as cherries), and artichoke and asparagus fields, which line the banks of the river. Notable for its historic towns, architecture, and wines, the valley has been inhabited since the Middle Palaeolithic period. In 2000, UNESCO added the central part of the Loire River valley to its list of World Heritage Sites.

== Geography and climate ==
The valley includes historic towns such as Amboise, Angers, Blois, Chinon, Montsoreau, Orléans, Saumur, and Tours.

The climate is favourable most of the year, the river often acting as a line of demarcation in France's weather between the northern climate and the southern. The river has a significant effect on the mesoclimate of the region, adding a few degrees of temperature. The climate can be cool with springtime frost while wine harvest months may have rain. Summers are hot; however, influences from the Atlantic moderate the temperature with breezes.

Temperature, rainfall and average sunshine time in Angers (Anjou):

Month	Jan	Feb	March	Apr	May	June	July	Aug	Sept	Oct	Nov	Dec	Year
Average minimum temperature (°C)	2.1	2.2	3.9	5.6	8.9	11.8	13.6	13.4	11.3	8.4	4.6	2.8	7.4
Average temperature (°C)	5	5.7	8.2	10.4	13.9	16.2	19.2	19.1	16.5	12.7	8	5.6	11.8
Average maximum temperature (°C)	7.9	9.2	12.6	15.3	19	22.6	24.9	24.7	21.8	17	11.4	8.4	16.2
Average monthly rainfall (mm)	62.1	50.8	51.7	44.6	54.4	41.2	43.8	44.9	52.2	59.6	64.5	63.4	63.4
Monthly hours of sunshine (hour/month)	70	92	141	179	201	234	248	237	191	129	89	65	1877

== Wine ==
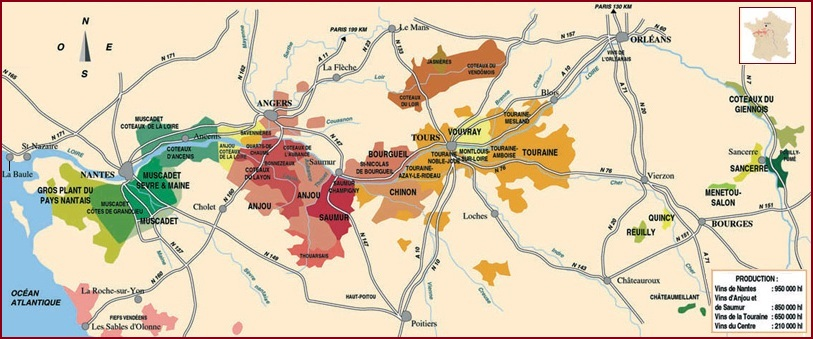
Vineyards in the Loire Valley

The Loire Valley wine region is one of the world's most well-known areas of wine production and includes several French wine regions situated along the river from the Muscadet region on the Atlantic coast to the regions of Sancerre and Pouilly-Fumé just southeast of the city of Orléans in north central France. Loire wines tend to exhibit a characteristic fruitiness with fresh, crisp flavours.

== Culture ==
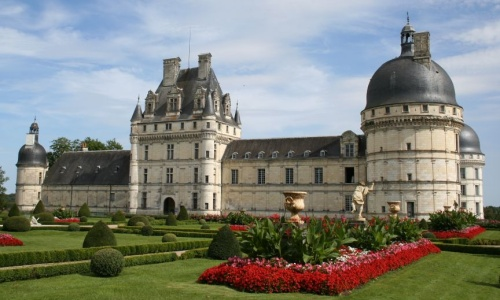
Château de Valençay

On 2 December 2000, UNESCO added the central part of the river valley, between Chalonnes-sur-Loire and Sully-sur-Loire, to its list of World Heritage Sites. In choosing this area that includes the French départements of Loiret, Loir-et-Cher, Indre-et-Loire, and Maine-et-Loire, the committee said that the Loire Valley is: "an exceptional cultural landscape, of great beauty, comprised of historic cities and villages, great architectural monuments - the châteaux - and lands that have been cultivated and shaped by centuries of interaction between local populations and their physical environment, in particular the Loire itself."

The Loire Valley chansonniers are a related group of songbooks attributed to the composers of the Loire Valley and are the earliest surviving examples of a new genre which offered a combination of words, music, and illuminations.

Several contemporary art institutions have been established along the Loire River Montsoreau to Orléans with such places as Château de Montsoreau-Contemporary Art Museum, CCCOD Tours, the Domaine Régional de Chaumont sur Loire and the Frac Centre Orléans. These sites combine Renaissance architecture with contemporary art collections.

== Architecture ==
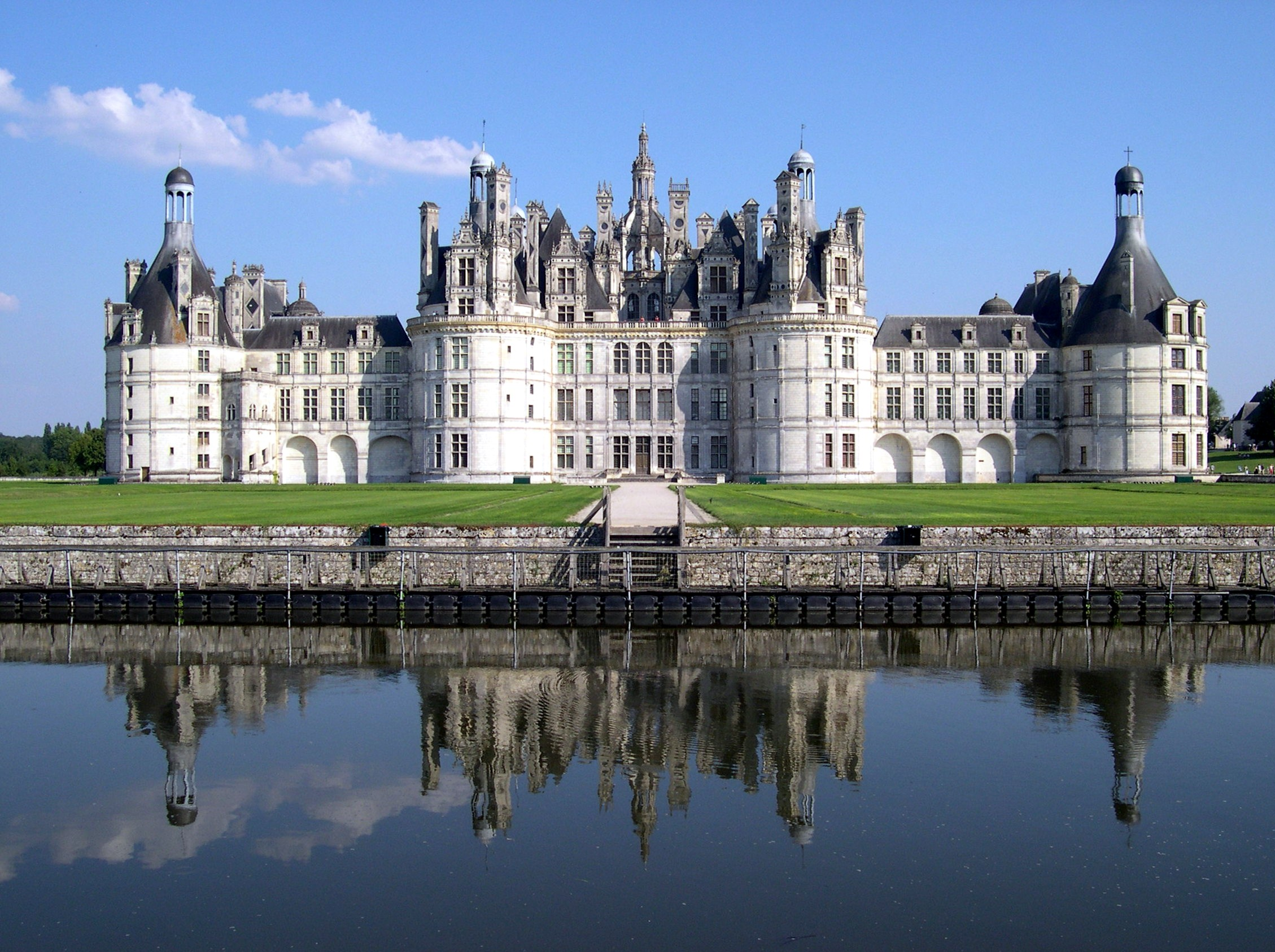
The Château de Chambord

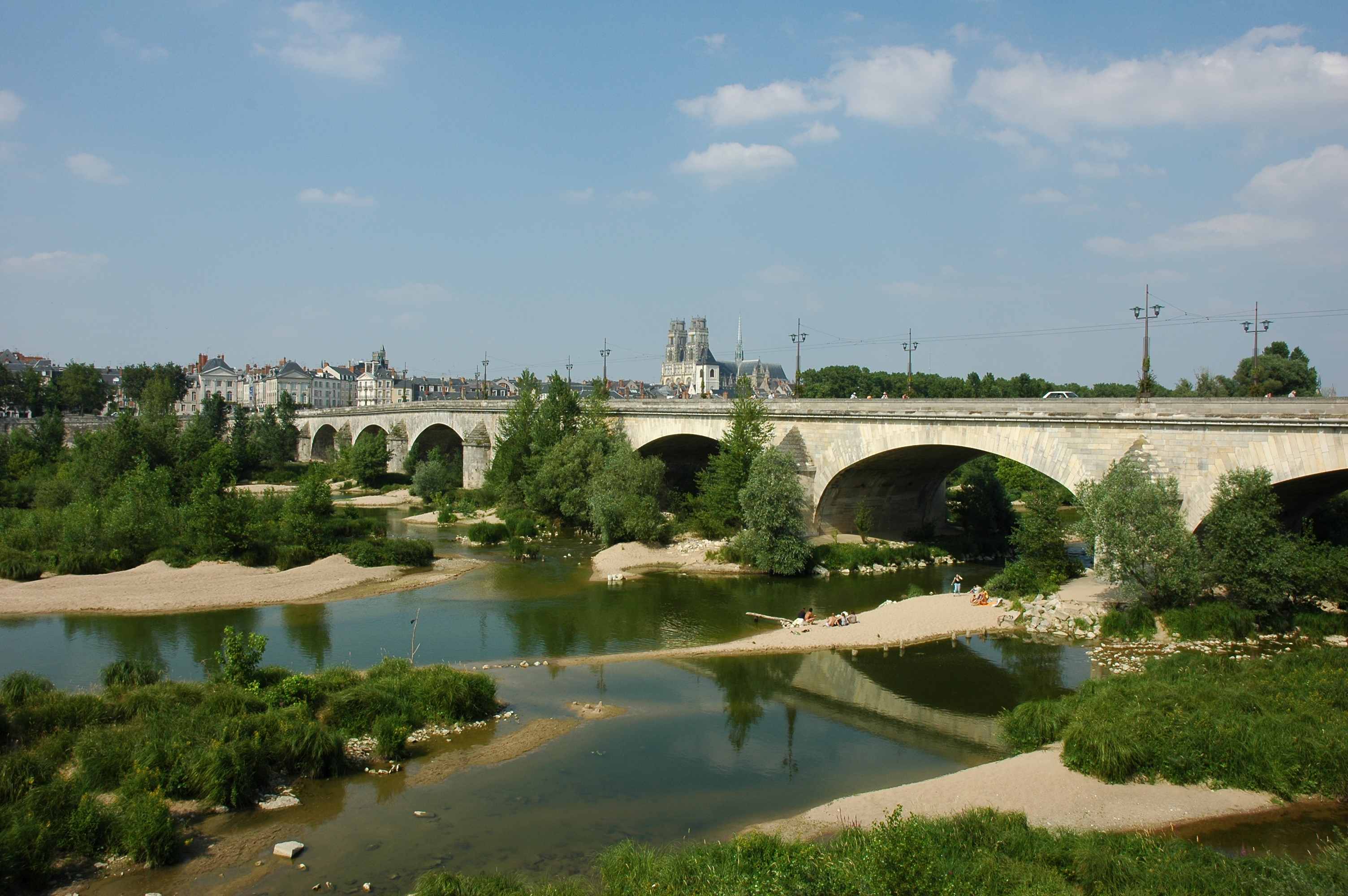
Orléans

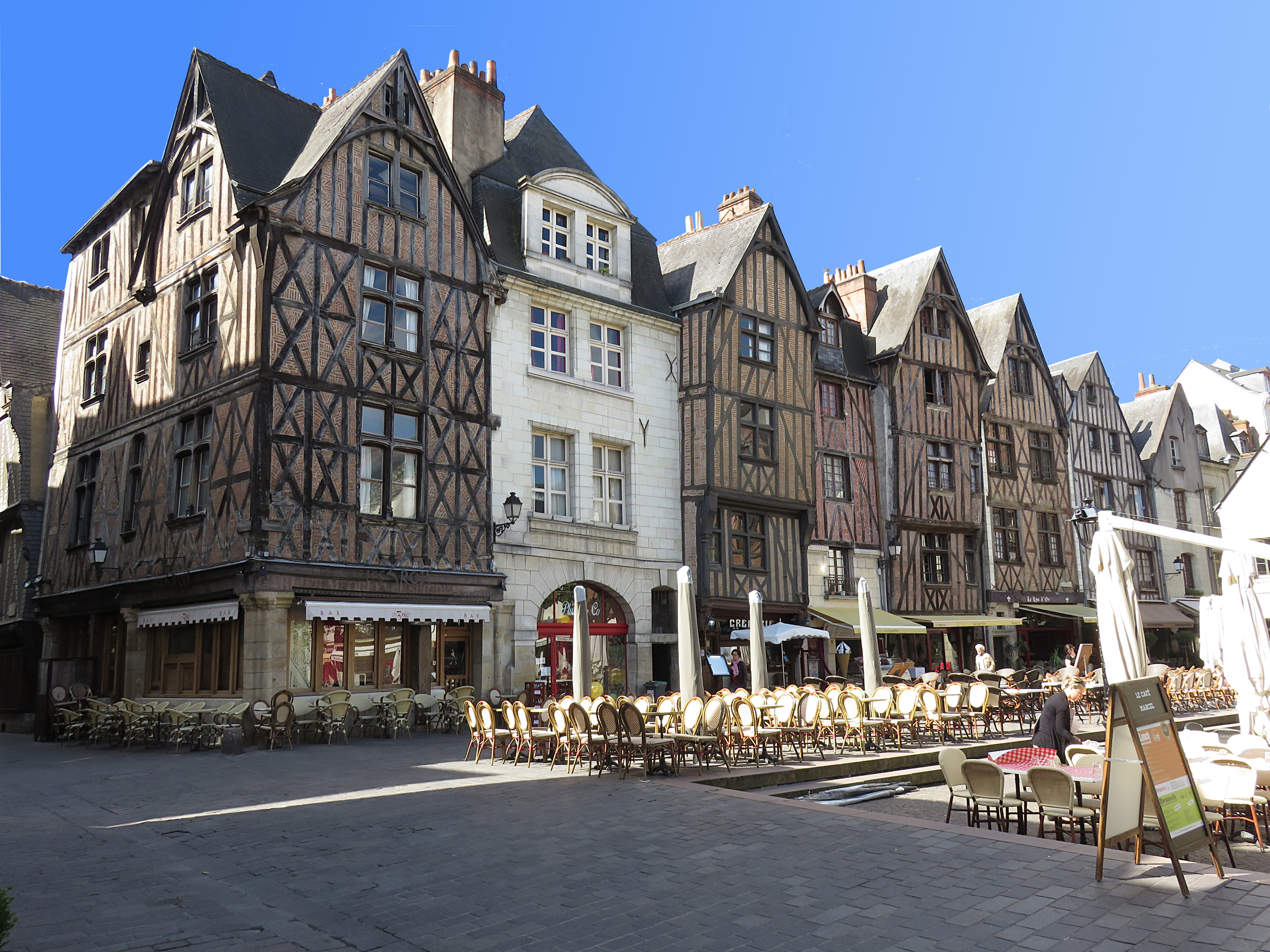
Tours

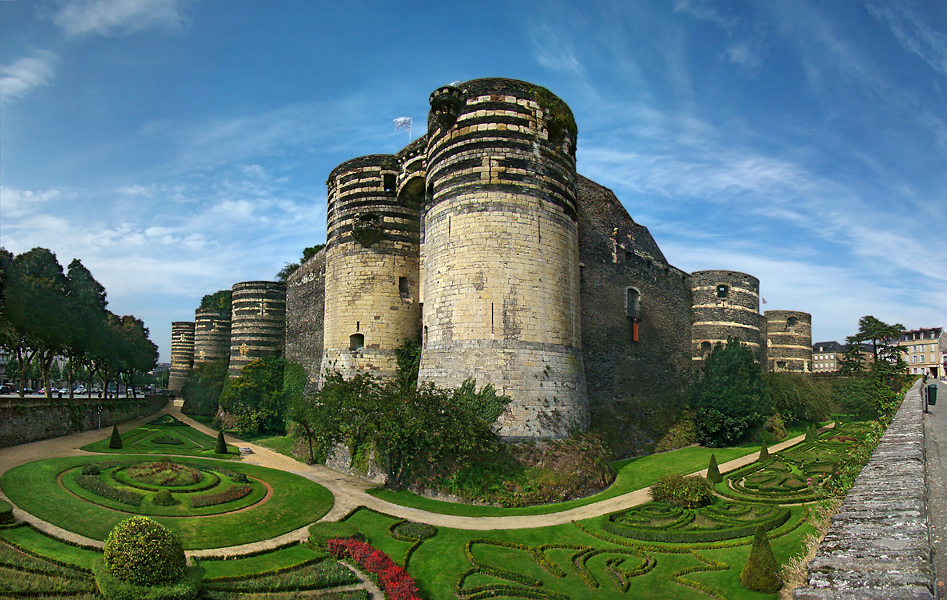
Angers

The architectural heritage in the valley's historic towns is notable, especially its châteaux, such as the Château de Montsoreau, Château d'Amboise, Château d'Azay-le-Rideau, Château de Chambord, Château de Chinon, Château du Rivau, Château d'Ussé, Château de Villandry and Chenonceau. The châteaux, numbering more than three hundred, include the necessary castle fortifications built in the 10th century but also the splendour of those built half a millennium later. When the French kings began constructing their huge châteaux here, the nobility, not wanting or even daring to be far from the seat of power, followed suit. Their presence in the lush, fertile valley began attracting the very best landscape designers. In addition to its many châteaux, the cultural monuments illustrate to an exceptional degree the ideals of the Renaissance and the Age of the Enlightenment on western European thought and design. Many of the châteaux were designed to be built on the top of hills, one example of this is the Château d'Amboise. Many of the châteaux had extremely detailed and expensive churches on the grounds, or within the actual château itself.

The Château de Montsoreau is the only château to have been built in the Loire riverbed, it is also the only one to be entirely dedicated to contemporary art.

== Economy ==
The European Commission reported that in 2016, three categories accounted for most of the economy in the Pays-de-la-Loire region: services (including tourism) provided 66.7% of employment, industry 26.5% and agriculture, 3.9%. The unemployment rate was 8.8%. In 2015, the region ranked eighth in France in terms of economic performance producing 5.0% of the gross domestic product. Important economic sectors included leather goods, textile, shipyard/construction and aeronautics, agriculture and food-processing as well as the plastics industry. The EC did not produce a report for the larger Loire Valley region.

According to another source, tourism in the Loire Valley was supported by over 700 hotels and 550 restaurants in the region. In addition to the chateaux and some 700 other listed Historic monuments, attractions included three Regional nature Parks, 550 km of cycling tracks, 800 listed Historic monuments, over 100 museums and 30 golf courses.

In April 2019, The Guardian's travel section included one Loire Valley location in its list of 20 of the most beautiful villages in France: Montrésor, "a fairytale village with a rich history" evidenced by "the wool market, the Halle de Cardeux, ... the 16th-century Logis du Chancelier, ... a riverside walk, Balcons de l’Indrois, [and] ... Jardinier Bridge".

According to a 2017 report by CNN, the 42 chateaux that make up the UNESCO World Heritage Site receive over 3.3 million visitors per year. The Telegraph newspaper (2014) listed the following as the premiere chateaux for tourists: Chinon, Cité royale de Loches, Chaumont, Blois, Meung, Chenonceau, Rivau, Lemeré, Amboise, Clos Lucé, Chambord, Villandry and Valençay.

== See also ==
- Orléans
