= David Hamilton (composer) =

New Zealand composer (born 1955)

David Blair Hamilton (born 21 December 1955) is a New Zealand composer and teacher.

== Biography ==
Hamilton was born in Napier and studied composition with Douglas Mews and John Rimmer at the University of Auckland. He graduated in 1979 with an MMus. He trained as a teacher and joined the staff of Epsom Girls Grammar School, and was then Head of Music from 1986 until 2001.

Hamilton gained early recognition as a composer by winning three national competitions in 1978 and 1979. This led to numerous commissions, including one from New Zealand's National Youth Choir, of which he was a founder member. Two of his works were included in the choir's programmes when they toured internationally in 1982.

He is particularly known for his choral music, with over four hundred works, which are widely performed, especially by school, youth and community choirs. His music has been published and recorded in Finland by SULASOL, in England by Oxford University Press, and in North America by Plymouth Music, Neil Kjos, Walton Music and Earthsongs.

Hamilton has been commissioned to write works for most major New Zealand music organisations including Radio New Zealand, the New Zealand Symphony Orchestra, Christchurch Symphony Orchestra, Auckland Choral, Chamber Music New Zealand, the New Zealand Youth Choir, and the Auckland Philharmonia. His works are widely performed outside New Zealand, with recent performances in Australia, the United States, Canada, Japan, Ireland and Finland.

As a choral conductor, he has predominantly conducted New Zealand community and school choirs; including the Tauranga Civic Choir, Napier Civic Choir, Pakuranga Choral Society, South Auckland Choral Society and at a number of schools including Epsom Girls Grammar School, St Mary's College's from 2008 to 2012, and Auckland Grammar School. He was also the Deputy Music Director of Auckland Choral from 1996 until 2011. Other activities have included choral adjudication in Japan, Hawaii, Argentina and Wales, and workshop presentations in Hong Kong, Singapore, Boston and Kuala Lumpur.

== Significant Compositions ==
Works featuring choir:

Lux Aeterna (1979) a six minute work for SSAATB choir
The Moon is Silently Singing (1985) a nine minute for two SSATB choirs and two horns
Te Deum (1986) a twenty-five minute work for solo alto, SSA and SAB semi-choruses, SAATBB choir, percussion, piano and organ
The Dragons are Singing Tonight (1996) an eighteen minute work for mixed-voice choir and brass band (or orchestra)
Monday's Troll (2002) an eight minute work for solo bass clarinet, choir and orchestra
Missa Pacifica (2005) an hour long work for soprano and alto soloists; mixed-voice SSATB youth choir, large mixed-voice choir; brass, percussion, and strings written for Auckland Choral's 150th anniversary.
Serenade (2011) for SSAA choir and chamber orchestra
The Necessary Rain (2012) a work for soprano, SAATBB choir, and orchestra
Erebus (2015) a twenty-five minute work for baritone solo, mixed choir, percussion, two pianos and pre-recorded soundscape.
Homecoming – Te Hokinga Mai (2018) for alto solo, SSATB choir, and chamber orchestra

Orchestral works:

Parabasis (1987) a fourteen minute work for orchestra
Elysian Fields (1998) a thirteen minute work for orchestra
Leukos (2000) a twenty-five minute work for large orchestra
Caveat Emptor (2008) for orchestra
Flight (2009) for orchestra
Children of the Fire Gods (2012) for orchestra
The Kingston Flyer (2013) for string orchestra and piano
Asahi (2020) for 2 guzheng, percussion and string orchestra

Works featuring a soloist or soloists with orchestra:

Double Percussion Concerto (1979) a twelve minute work for two percussionists and orchestra
Breaking the Quiet (2008) for solo baritone and orchestra
Solar Phoenix (2010) for trumpet and chamber orchestra
Chimera (2013) a twelve minute work for solo organ and orchestra
Piano Concerto No. 2 (2018) for solo piano and orchestra
Concertino for Oboe and Strings (2012) for oboe and string orchestra
Concerto for Piano Duet (2015) piano (4 hands) and orchestra
Paper Cut (2015) for piano solo and concert band
Cutting Edge (2020) for drum kit solo and orchestra

Chamber works:

Nix Olympica (1985) for oboe, clarinet, bassoon, horn and piano
Hurdy Gurdy (1989) for flute, clarinet, violin and piano
Promat Chorus Hodie (1994) for flute, cello and piano
Kristallnacht (2009) for flute, guitar, piano and 2 percussion
Imagined Dances (2010) for flute, violin and guitar
Tui (2010) for 2 pianos (8 hands)
The Faraday Cage (2015) for violin, cello, and piano
Parlour Games (2016) for string quartet
Imagined Dances II (2017) for viola d’amore, cello and guitar
Three Love Songs of Sara Teasdale (2018) for soprano, clarinet, guzheng and piano
Electric (2019) for flute, clarinet, alto saxophone, drum kit, cello and double bass

== Residencies ==
- 1999 Composer-in-Residence with the Auckland Philharmonia Orchestra
- 2013 Guest Composer at Sing Aotearoa
- 2015 Composer-in-Residence at the New Zealand Singing School

== Awards ==
- 1978 Philip Neill Memorial Prize (won) for Canticle 1 for oboe, baritone and piano.
- 1978 Wellington Youth Orchestra's composers' competition (won) for In Memoriam Charles Ives
- 1978 Auckland Dorian Choir composers' competition (won) for Magnificat
- 1981 Wellington Youth Orchestra's composers' competition (won) for Atlas Elliptica
- 1987 Dunedin Sinfonia's composition competition (won) for Parabasis
- 2000 University of Bologna (Italy) composition competition (won) for Veni Sancte Spiritus
- 2005 NUVOVOX Choral Award (USA) (won) for Deus, Deus, Meus
- 2006 Ned Rorem Award for Song Composition (USA) (won) for Ask Me No More
- 2006 New Zealand Flute Society Composition Competition (won) for Dreamwaltz
- 2007 Haifa International Composers' Competition (Israel) (won) for Hine Raukatauri, for flute and chamber orchestra.
- 2007 Longfellow Chorus Composers' Competition (USA) (2nd place) for The Singers
- 2008 The Chapter House Choir Composers’ Competition (York, England) (2nd place) for Carol of Cold Comfort
- 2014 Harp Society of NZ competition for a new work for solo harp (won) for Wairua.
- 2016 Stockton Chorale Composition Contest (won) for American Triptych
- 2017 Australia New Zealand Viola Society Composition Competition: Viola Ensemble, Open Division (won) for Are We There Yet for five violas.
- 2019 Atlanta Contemporary Ensemble Composition Competition for Electric
- 2020 Delta Omicron Triennial Composition Competition (USA) (won) for Night Songs III
- 2020 IX Amadeus International Choral Composition Competition (Spain) – 1st place for Balada Amarilla (Category B: voices with piano), 2nd place for Dos Lunas de Tarde II (Category A: unaccompanied voices), and 3rd place for Dos Lunas de Tarde I (Category A: unaccompanied voices)
- 2020 Philip Neill Memorial Prize (won) for Canticle 6: Fragments from Lorca for mezzo soprano, violin and piano.
- 2020 Orpheus Music Composition Competition (won) for Whirligig
