= Matthaeus Pipelare =

Netherlandish composer and choir director

Matthaeus Pipelare (c. 1450 – c. 1515) was a Netherlandish composer, choir director, and possibly wind instrument player of the Renaissance.

He was from Louvain, and spent part of his early life in Antwerp. Unlike many of his contemporaries, many of whom traveled to Italy, Spain or elsewhere, he seems never to have left the Low Countries. In spring 1498 he became the choir director at the Illustrious Confraternity of Our Lady at 's-Hertogenbosch, a position he held until 1500. From his name it is presumed that either he or perhaps his father was a wind player, for example a town piper.

Pipelare's style was wide-ranging; he wrote in almost all of the vocal forms current in his day: masses, motets, secular songs in all the local languages. No instrumental music has survived. In mood his music ranged from light secular songs to sombre motets related to those of Pierre de La Rue, an almost exact contemporary.

He wrote 11 complete masses which have survived to modern times (although many of the manuscripts were destroyed in the Second World War), as well as 10 motets, and 8 chansons; the chansons are both in French and Dutch. One of the masses is a four-voice cantus firmus setting of L'homme armé, a style which was already old-fashioned by the time he was writing; the tune moves from voice to voice, but is usually in the tenor. His Missa Fors seulement is based on his own chanson, which he used as the cantus firmus. Memorare Mater Christi is a seven-part motet on the sorrows of the Virgin Mary; each of the seven voices represents a different dolor. The third of the seven voices even quotes the contemporary Spanish villancico "Nunca fué pena mayor" (never was there a greater pain) by Juan de Urrede. Sequential writing and syncopated rhythms are characteristic of his music.

== Discography ==
- Matthaeus Pipelare: Missa L'homme armé; Chansons; Motets", Huelgas Ensemble (Paul Van Nevel), Sony
- Matthaeus Pipelare: Paradise Regained - Masses, The Sound and the Fury, Fra Bernardo (2014)
