= Rex gloriose martyrum =

In Roman Catholic liturgy, Rex Gloriose Martyrum is the hymn at Lauds in the Common of Martyrs (Commune plurimorum Martyrum) given in the Roman Breviary. It comprises three strophes of four verses in Classical iambic dimeter, the verses rhyming in couplets, together with a fourth concluding strophe (or doxology) in unrhymed verses varying for the season.

The first stanza illustrates the metric and rhymic scheme:

Rex gloriose martyrum,
Corona confitentium,
Qui respuentes terrea
Perducis ad coelestia.

== History ==
The hymn is of uncertain date and unknown authorship, Mone (Lateinische Hymnen des Mittelalters, III, 143, no. 732) ascribing it to the sixth century and Daniel (Thesaurus Hymnologicus, IV, 139) to the ninth or tenth century. The Roman Breviary text is a revision, in the interest of Classical prosody, of an older form (given by Daniel, I, 248). The corrections are:

- terrea instead of terrena in the line "Qui respuentes terrena"
- parcisque for parcendo in the line "Parcendo confessoribus"
- inter Martyres for in Martyribus in the line "Tu vincis in Martyribus"
- "Largitor indulgentiæ" for the line "Donando indulgentiam"

A non-prosodic correction is intended for appone in the line "Appone nostris vocibus". Daniel (IV, 139) gives the Roman Breviary text, but mistakenly includes the uncorrected line "Parcendo confessoribus". He places after the hymn an elaboration of it in thirty-two lines, found written on leaves added to a Nuremberg book and intended to accommodate the hymn to Protestant doctrine. This elaborated form uses only lines 1, 2, 4, 5, 6, 8, 9 of the original. Two of the added strophes may be quoted here to illustrate the possible reason (but also a misconception of doctrine in the apparent assumption of the lines) for the modification of the original hymn:

Velut infirma vascula
Ictus inter lapideos
Videntur sancti martyres,
Sed fide durant fortiter.
Non fidunt suis meritis,
Sed sola tua gratia
Agnoscunt se persistere
In tantis cruciatibus.
