= Canticum Canticorum (Palestrina) =

1584 cycle of motets by Giovanni Pierluigi da Palestrina

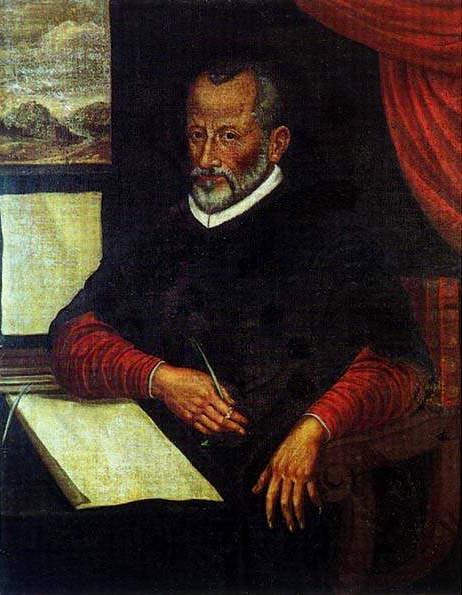
Portrait of Giovanni Pierluigi da Palestrina, by an unknown Italian painter (c. 1590)

Canticum Canticorum (Song of Solomon) from 1584 is a cycle of 29 motets by Giovanni Pierluigi da Palestrina. Originally titled Motettorum - Liber Quartus, this Renaissance work is one of Palestrina's largest collections of Sacred motets.

The work is in Latin and based upon excerpts from the book in the Song of Songs of the Old Testament. The Song of Songs is thought to be an allegorical representation of the relationship of God and the faithful as husband and wife. The text uses the main image of a man and wife almost throughout, the poem suggesting movement from courting to consummation.

Palestrina's setting of the text is scored for 5 voices: SATTB (1 - 18, 29), SAATB (19 - 22, 27 - 28), and SSATB (23 - 26); and was published, after revision, by Breitkopf and Härtel in the collection Palestrina Werke, vol. 4.

== History ==
Canticum Canticorum was written in the year 1584. This work, as with many of Palestrina's works around this time, was dedicated to Pope Gregory XIII. The work can, however, also be seen as a social statement which challenged what music was commonly accepted in the church at the time.

It is assumed that during its composition, he kept in mind that other church composers had lost their jobs for composing madrigals, and he, also being guilty of this fault, would ‘repent’ by composing music that celebrates divine love. His illustration of passion in this piece exceeds that of any of his other sacred works. Through the work, Palestrina insists upon the independence of musicians, firstly through the composition thereof, and secondly through admitting awareness of what he has created - a musical setting of profane love songs, but ultimately a celebration of divine love. Palestrina famously declared: "Sic enim rem ipsam postulare intelligebam" - indicating that he realised that he was creating something new which may not be suitable for use in the church. He did, however, continue to refer to the motets as sacred.

== Structure ==
The entire piece forms a dramatic lyric consisting of a series of individual motets. The work is also divided into larger sections, or episodes, distinguishable by mode. It is often questioned whether the motets were designed to be performed as a whole or separately, although it seems Palestrina attempted to arrange the text according to coherence and climax - strong evidence that the work is of a single design.

By grouping the motets together in modes, there is a sense of dramatic unity. Palestrina did not use the biblical verses in their original order, but arranged them to achieve a dramatic context. Motets 1 to 10 are in the G Dorian mode. The third motet ends with the lyrics “they made me the keeper of the vineyards”, while motet 4 opens with the text “but mine own vineyard have I not kept”. Motet 4 then continues with a question which is in turn answered in motet 5. The entire work is set up in this way, one motet connecting to the next - telling a story that continues until the end of the first episode (motet 10). The following episodes continue with the same dramatic development. Episode 2 (in G Mixolydian) ends unexpectedly with the use of a single motet in the Hypoaolian mode, the only one in the collection (motet 19). The final 2 episodes are in the E Phrygian mode and F Ionian mode respectively.

The Motets are organized in the collection as follows:

	Name	Translation	Text (within Song of Songs)	Mode	Voicing
1	Osculetur me (osculo oris sui)	Let him kiss me (with the kiss of his mouth)	Chapter 1: 1-2	G Dorian	SATTB
2	Trahe me post te	Draw me after you	Chapter 1: 3	G Dorian	SATTB
3	Nigra sum sed formosa	I am black, but comely	Chapter 1: 4 - 5	G Dorian	SATTB
4	Vineam meam non custodivi	My vineyard I have not kept	Chapter 1: 6 - 7	G Dorian	SATTB
5	Si ignotas te	If you do not know	Chapter 1: 8 - 9	G Dorian	SATTB
6	Pulchrae sunt genae tuae	Thy cheeks are beautiful	Chapter 1:10	G Dorian	SATTB
7	Fasciculus myrrhae (dilectus meus mihi)	A bundle of Myrrh (is my beloved to me)	Chapter 1:13 - 15	G Dorian	SATTB
8	Ecce tu pulcher es	Behold thou art fair	Chapter 1:16 - 2:1	G Dorian	SATTB
9	Tota pulcher es	You are althougher beautiful	Chapter 4: 7 - 8	G Dorian	SATTB
10	Vulnerasti cor meum	You have ravished my heart	Chapter 4:9-10	G Dorian	SATTB
11	Sicut lilium inter spinas	A Lilly among thorns	Chapter 2:2 - 3	G Mixolydian	SATTB
12	Introduxit me rex (in cellam vinariam)	He brought me (into the cellar of wine)	Chapter 2:4 - 5	G Mixolydian	SATTB
13	Laeva eius (sub capite meo)	His left hand (is under my head)	Chapter 2:6 - 7	G Mixolydian	SATTB
14	Vox dilecti mei	The voice of my beloved	Chapter 2:8 - 10	G Mixolydian	SATTB
15	Surge, propera amica mea	Arise, my love	Chapter 2: 10 - 13	G Mixolydian	SATTB
16	Surge, amica mea (speciosa mea et veni)	Arise, my love (my fair one, and come away)	Chapter 2:13 - 14	G Mixolydian	SATTB
17	Dilectus meus mihi, (et ego illi)	My beloved is mine, (and I am his)	Chapter 2: 16 - 17	G Mixolydian	SATTB
18	Surgam et circuibo civitatem	I will rise and go about the city	Chapter 3: 2	G Mixolydian	SATTB
19	Adiuro vos (filiae Jerusalem)	I charge you (O ye daughters of Jerusalem)	Chapter 5: 8 - 10	A Hypoaolian	SAATB
20	Caput eius (aurum optimum)	His head (is the finest gold)	Chapter 5: 11 - 12	E Phrygian	SAATB
21	Dilectus meus descendit (in hortum suum)	My beloved has gone down (into his garden)	Chapter 6: 2 - 3	E Phrygian	SAATB
22	Pulchra es, amica mea	Thou art beautiful, oh my love	Chapter 6: 4 - 5	E Phrygian	SAATB
23	Quae est ista (quae progreditur quasi)	Who is she (that cometh like the dawn)	Chapter 6: 9	E Phrygian	SSATB
24	Descendi in hortum nucum	I went down into the garden of nuts	Chapter 6: 10	E Phrygian	SSATB
25	Quam pulchri sunt (gressus tui in calceamentis)	How graceful are (your feet in sandals)	Chapter 7: 1 - 2	F Ionian	SSATB
26	Duo ubera tua (sicut duo hinnuli)	Thy two breasts (are like two young roses)	Chapter 7: 3 - 5	F Ionian	SSATB
27	Quam pulchra es et quam decora	How fair and pleasant you are	Chapter 7: 6 - 8	F Ionian	SAATB
28	Guttur tuum sicut (vinum optimum)	Thy throat is like (the best wine)	Chapter 7: 9 - 10	F Ionian	SAATB
29	Veni, veni dilecte mi, (egrediamur in agrum)	Come, come my beloved, (let us go forth into the fields)	Chapter 7: 11 - 12	F Ionian	SATTB

== Analysis ==
The work is in five-part polyphony, which was considered undramatic at the time. Therefore, some writers emphasised that if Palestrina intended for these motets to be a single quasi-dramatic work then the textual content would not have been set to five-part polyphony. On the other hand, Palestrina was deeply rooted in traditional polyphony, questioning the value of that claim. Nevertheless, the polyphony itself forms an important element in the work - for example, in motet XIX, Palestrina makes use of polyphony to individualise the Lover. She asks the Daughters of Jerusalem about her lover and they reply. The polyphony symbolises the crowd, as well as expressing the Lover as an individual.

Palestrina was restricted by the musical practices of his day. It was common for him and his contemporaries to overcome this obstacle by creating very long pieces that can be divided into shorter works, each clearly distinguishable by their episodic character. A unity was created by building the work at large around a specific theme. No form of the time was suited to anything as large as even the first 10 motets, which form the first episode of this work.

Stylistically the individual pieces are in fact a combination of the madrigal and the motet. The texture is notably tighter than those typically found in motets or masses of the time. There is also a powerful, passionate tone throughout the work, distinguishing it from others of its time.
