= Philippe Basiron =

French composer, singer and organist

Philippe Basiron (Philippon de Bourges) (c. 1449 – just before 31 May 1491) was a French composer, singer, and organist of the Renaissance. He was an innovative and prominent composer of the late 15th century, and was praised by many of his contemporaries.

== Life ==
He was probably born in Bourges, and received his early training there, becoming a choirboy at the Sainte-Chapelle de Bourges attached to the royal palace (now the Hôtel de préfecture du Cher) in October 1458, along with his brother Pierron. Between October 1458 and 31 March 1459 the brothers were assigned to the care of Jehan Gaudier, and in 1462 the composer Guillaume Faugues became briefly magister puerorum (master of the choirboys); he may have been a formative influence on the young Philippe. The boy's musical gifts were sufficiently distinguished that he had a clavichord purchased for him in 1462, an extremely rare occurrence for a choirboy of 12 or 13 years old. Ockeghem also visited Bourges that year, but if the boy made his acquaintance then is not known; however the influence, and possibly friendship, of the older composer was to become clear later.

In 1464 he already had a position of authority, being given the responsibility for the musical instruction of the other boys. In 1466 he became vicar-choral, and on 5 February 1469 he became magister puerorum himself.

His tenure as master of the choirboys was not without difficulty; several times he was reprimanded by the chapel authorities for failing to keep his charges out of trouble. However, he was the first person to hold the position for five years; in the preceding three years, no less than five separate people had tried and failed to maintain the unruly choir. In 1474 he left Ste Chapelle, but the circumstances are not known. His successor there was François Maugis.

Sometime before 1490 he returned to Ste Chapelle, but since all records from the chapel between 1476 and 1486 are lost, the exact date cannot be determined. Basiron was vicar of a nearby church in 1490, and had to have died shortly before 31 May 1491, since a benefice of his passed to a brother on that date.

== Music and influence ==
Basiron's music was widely distributed in Europe, and was highly praised by his contemporaries. In addition he was precocious: many of his chansons were written in his teens, and probably much more of his early music has been lost. A total of four masses, three motets and six chansons have survived, and also one mass which has an uncertain attribution to him.

Stylistically Basiron's music resembles that of Ockeghem, and is innovative in several ways. He used sequential repetition, and was perhaps the first composer to write a piece in which imitation was the main structural device from beginning to end (the Regina celi). He also was capable of creating long movements by juxtaposing sections of varying texture, but without disunity; his Messa de Franza is the most famous example. Ercole I d'Este, duke of Ferrara, heard of Basiron's fame, and asked that his Missa l'homme armé be sent to him.

Eloy d'Amerval mentioned Basiron in 1508 as among the "20 great composers of the 15th century"; both Pierre Moulu and theorist Gaffurius praised him highly; and most famously, poet Guillaume Crétin, in his Déploration sur le trépas de Jean Ockeghem, listed Basiron among the sweetly singing angels in heaven welcoming Ockeghem to join them.

== Works ==
=== Masses ===
1. Missa de Franza (4vv);
2. Missa l'homme armé (mentioned as a new composition on 24 March 1484, in Ferrara) (4vv);
3. Missa Regina caeli (4vv);
4. Missa tetradi pladis (lost; described by Franchinus Gaffurius) (voicing unknown)

=== Mass (attributed) ===
1. Missa D'ung aultre amer (4vv)

=== Motets ===
1. Inviolata integra et casta (4vv);
2. Regina celi (4vv);
3. Salve regina (4vv) (also, erroneously, attributed to Johannes Ockeghem).

=== Chansons ===
1. De m'esjouir plus n'ay puissance (3vv) (Rondeau);
2. D’ung aultre amer I (4vv) (uses "L'homme armé" in the tenor);
3. D’ung aultre amer II (4vv);
4. Je le sçay bien (3vv) (Rondeau);
5. Nul ne l'a tele (3vv) (Bergerette, based on "Je ne viz onques la pareille" by Guillaume Dufay, Gilles Binchois, or Antoine Busnois);
6. Tant fort me tarde (3vv) (Rondeau).

== Recording ==
- 1996 - Oh Flanders Free. Music of the Flemish Renaissance: Ockeghem, Josquin, Susato, De la Rue. Capilla Flamenca. Alamire LUB 03, Naxos 8.554516.
