= L'homme armé =

French secular song from the Late Middle Ages

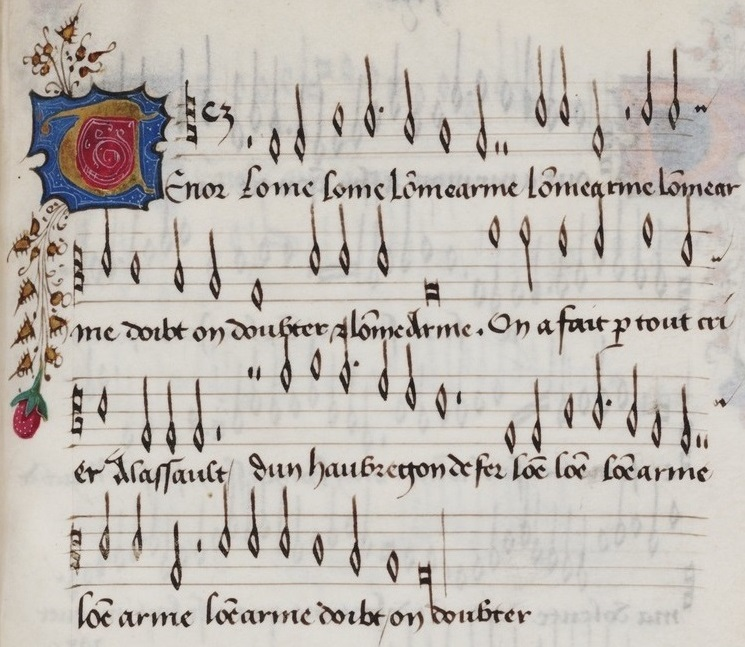
"L'homme armé" in the Mellon Chansonnier, c. 1470

L'homme armé (from French 'the armed man') is a secular song from the Late Middle Ages, of the Burgundian School. According to Allan W. Atlas, "the tune circulated in both the Mixolydian mode and Dorian mode (transposed to G)." It was the most popular tune used for musical settings of the Ordinary of the Mass: over 40 separate compositions entitled Missa L'homme armé survive from the period.

== Lyrics ==
French

L'homme armé doibt on doubter.
On a fait partout crier
Que chascun se viegne armer
D'un haubregon de fer.
L'homme armé doibt on doubter.

Translation:
English

The armed man should be feared.
Everywhere it has been proclaimed
That each man shall arm himself
With a coat of iron mail.
The armed man should be feared.

== Origin ==
The origins of the popularity of the song and the importance of the armed man are the subject of various theories. Some have suggested that the 'armed man' represents St Michael the Archangel. The composer Johannes Regis (c. 1425 – c. 1496) seems to have intended that allusion in his Dum sacrum mysterium/Missa l'homme armé based upon the melody, which incorporates various additional trope texts and cantus firmus plainchants in honour of St Michael the Archangel. Others have suggested it merely represents the name of a popular tavern (Maison L'Homme Arme) near Du Fay's rooms in Cambrai. It may also represent the arming for a new crusade against the Turks. There is ample evidence to indicate that it held special significance for the Order of the Golden Fleece. It is useful to note that the first appearance of the song was exactly contemporaneous with the fall of Constantinople to the Ottoman Turks (1453), an event which had a huge psychological effect in Europe; composers such as Guillaume Du Fay composed laments for the occasion. Yet another possibility is that all three theories are true, given the feeling of urgency, pervasive in central and northern Europe at the time, in organizing a military opposition to the recently victorious Ottomans.

Another recently proposed theory for the origin of the tune is that it is a stylised combination of a street cry and a trumpet call, and may have originated as early as the late 14th century, or perhaps early 15th, due to its use of the major prolation, which was the most common metre at the time. Richard Taruskin noted that the tune was a special favourite of Charles the Bold and suggested that it may have been composed for him (or, at very least, that he had identified himself with the titular man at arms). This however has been refuted by researchers who show it was used before Charles the Bold's ascension as Duke of Burgundy.

== Use in the Latin Mass ==
L'homme armé is remembered today because it was used by Renaissance composers as a cantus firmus for the Latin Mass. It was probably used for this purpose more than any other secular song: over 40 settings are known. Multiple composers of the Renaissance set at least one mass on this melody; the two settings by Josquin (the Missa L'homme armé super voces musicales and the Missa L'homme armé sexti toni) are among the best known. Other composers who wrote more than one setting include Matthaeus Pipelare, Pierre de la Rue, Cristóbal de Morales, Guillaume Du Fay and Giovanni Pierluigi da Palestrina (two settings). A group of six settings, all anonymous but probably by the same composer, survives in a Neapolitan manuscript which was supposedly a gift to Beatrice of Aragon of some of the favorite music of Charles the Bold.

Missa "L'homme armé" for 12 voices (attributed to Giacomo Carissimi)

While the practice of writing masses on the tune lasted into the seventeenth century, including a late setting by Carissimi, the majority of mass settings of "L'homme armé", approximately 30, are from the period between 1450 and 1510.

One of the earliest datable uses of the melody itself was in the combinative chanson Il sera pour vous conbatu/L'homme armé ascribed to Robert Morton, which now is believed probably to date from around 1463, owing to historical references in the text. Another possibly earlier version of the tune is an anonymous three-voice setting from the Mellon Chansonnier, which also cannot be precisely dated. In 1523 Pietro Aron, in his treatise Thoscanello suggested that Antoine Busnois was the composer of the tune; while tantalizing, since the tune is stylistically consistent with Busnois, there is no other source to corroborate Aron, and he was writing approximately 70 years after the first appearance of the melody. Taruskin has argued that Busnois wrote the earliest known mass on the melody, but this is disputed, some scholars preferring to see the older Guillaume Du Fay as the creator of the first L'homme armé Mass. Other composers whose settings of the tune may date from the 1450s include Guillaume Faugues, Johannes Regis, and Johannes Ockeghem.

The tune is singularly well-adapted to contrapuntal treatment. The phrases are clearly delineated, and there are several obvious ways to construct canons. It is also easy to recognize within a contrapuntal texture.

== Modern treatments ==
Composers still occasionally turn to this song for spiritual or thematic inspiration.

- British composer Peter Maxwell Davies: parody mass Missa super l'homme armé (1968, revised 1971).
- Welsh composer Karl Jenkins drew heavily on L'homme armé for his 1999 mass, The Armed Man – A Mass for Peace, composed for SATB chorus, soloists and symphonic orchestra and dedicated to the victims of the 1998–1999 Kosovo War.
- Throughout his work, "Seven Last Words of the Unarmed", Joel Thompson uses L'homme armé as a thematic motif.
- It was used in the video games Darklands and Pentiment.
- American composer Mark Alburger includes settings of "L'homme armé" in the first (Ockeghem) and tenth (Bach) movements of his 1992 Deploration Passacaglias.
- The neoclassical/neo-folk/martial Italian collective Camerata Mediolanense reworked the song in two slightly different versions: one featured in the album "Madrigali" (1998) and one – more extended – in the split-EP with Pavor Nocturnus called L'Alfiere (2001), later included as a bonus track in the 2013 re-issue of their album Campo di Marte (1995).
- Christopher Marshall wrote L'homme armé: Variations for Wind Ensemble in 2003.
- Beverly Grigsby wrote a set of variations in 2005.
- Mawkin:Causley reworked L'homme armé for a track under the same title on their 2009 album The Awkward Recruit (Navigator).
- South African composer David Earl uses the L'homme armé melody as the theme for the finale (theme and variations) in his Clarinet Concerto (2013).
- Canadian pianist Marc-André Hamelin wrote "Toccata on L'Homme Armé" on commission by the Van Cliburn Foundation for the Fifteenth Van Cliburn International Piano Competition. Every competitor was required to perform it in the preliminary stage of the competition.
- The song was the subject of a radio documentary, The Smash Hit of 1453, presented by Rainer Hersch and broadcast on BBC Radio 4 on 10 April 2010.
- American conductor Joshua Oppenheim set the Spanish translation of the text, "El Hombre Armado," to the original tune.
