= Missa Tu es Petrus =

Parody mass by Giovanni Pierluigi da Palestrina

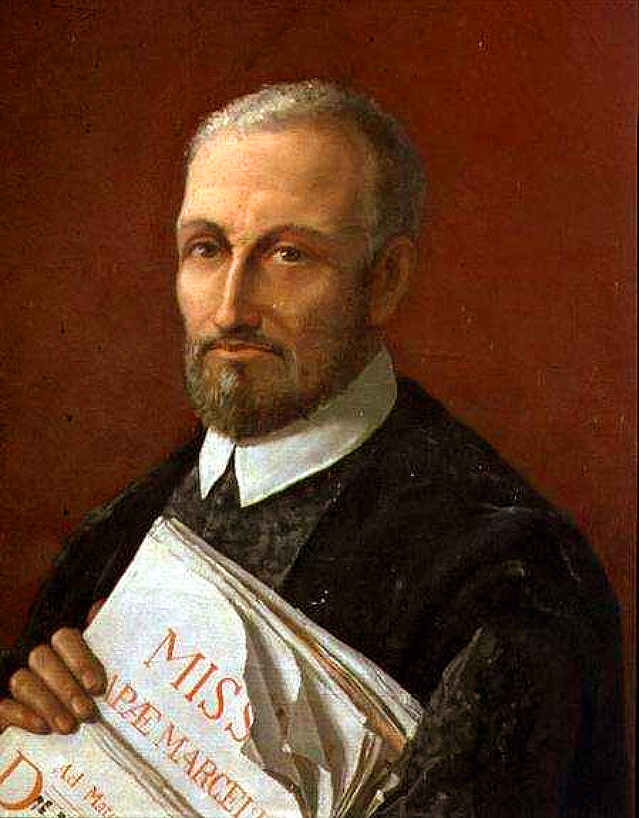
Portrait of Giovanni Pierluigi da Palestrina, 16th century

Missa Tu es Petrus is a parody mass for six voices (SSATBB) by Giovanni Pierluigi da Palestrina first printed in the Missarum, Liber 15 (1887) of Franz Xaver Haberl's edition. The eponymous model Tu es Petrus ("Thou art Peter") is one of three motets by Palestrina, all on the same text, intended “for the Feast of St. Paul and St. Peter” (29 June); the other two are for 5 and 7 voices. In fact there are three Missae Tu es Petrus, the less well-known being a six-voice paraphrase mass on the gregorian antiphon posthumously published in Missarum, Liber 12 (1601), and a polychoral mass for 18vv of doubtful authenticity that like the other parody mass adapts the music of the same 1572 motet to the texts of the Ordinary of the Mass.

== History ==
Palestrina frequently employed parody technique, reworking old material in newer works. The text of the model is in Latin and is based on Matthew 16:18–19:

Tu es Petrus, et super hanc petram
Aedificabo Ecclesiam meam,
Et portae inferi non praevalebunt adversus eam:
Et tibi dabo claves
Regni coelorum.

Quodcumque ligaveris super terram,
Erit ligatum et in coelis;
Et quodcumque solveris super terram
Erit solutum et in coelis.

You are Peter, and on this rock
I will build My church,
And the gates of hell will not prevail against it:
And I will give you the keys
To the kingdom of heaven.

Whatever you bind on earth
Will be bound also in heaven;
And whatever you release on earth
Will be released also in heaven.

— Matthew 16:18–19

== Analysis ==
The mass consists of seven movements, standard for a choral mass: Kyrie, Gloria, Credo, Sanctus, Benedictus, Agnus Dei 1 and Agnus Dei 2.

In the opening of the majority of the main movements in the mass, Palestrina copies almost exactly the notation of the motet from the original work. The added features give the piece a more, “fugal” feel. The work is antiphonal in its structure and is meant to convey an overwhelming sense of joy. The work requires singers to balance respect for the religious nature of the work, while exhibiting a sense of glee. The major key also adds to its blissful character. The music combines vivacity with quiet and tender touches that suit its intended performance venue, i.e. a church/cathedral. In general, its tempi are reasonably calm, so the sense of excitement and ecstasy ensues in its transformation through performance.

In AllMusic, Donato Mancini wrote, "Palestrina's style has virtually become a stand-in for sacred-sounding music, partly because his was the last generation of composers dedicated to a purely contrapuntal style. His own stylistic aim seems to have been to sum up and bring to a peak of refinement and clarity the accomplishments of those who came before him. Missa Tu es Petrus is one of those works where that aim is most perfectly achieved."

== Bibliography ==
- Classical Net Review - Palestrina - Missa Tu es Petrus
- Emmanuel Music - Giovanni Pierluigi da Palestrina: "Tu es Petrus" - Translation
- Palestrina: Missa Tu es Petrus & Missa Te Deum laudamus
- Tu es Petrus a 6 (Giovanni Pierluigi da Palestrina) - ChoralWiki
