= Missa L'homme armé a 5 (Palestrina) =

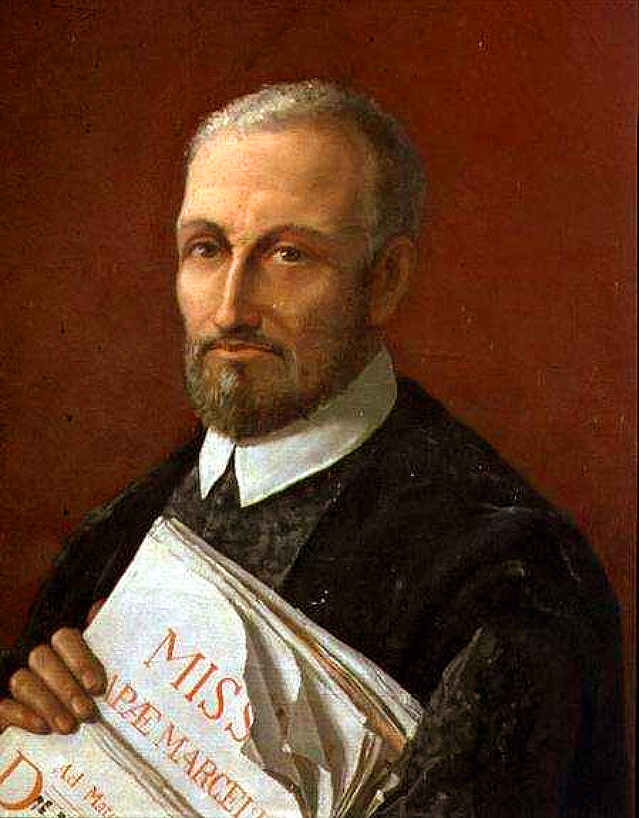
Portrait of Giovanni Pierluigi da Palestrina, 16th century

Missa L'Homme armé is a setting of the mass by Giovanni Pierluigi da Palestrina. Scholars suspect that Palestrina composed it during the 1560s, and it was published in 1570 and consists of five movements. It is scored for Cantus, Altus, Tenor, Quintus (Tenor II) and Bassus. A sixth voice, Cantus II, is added for the final Agnus Dei. Palestrina uses the Mixolydian version (Mode VII) of the L'homme armé melody as the Cantus Firmus for this setting. It should not be confused with his second setting, Missa L'homme armé @ 4, which was published in 1582 in the collection Missarum Liber Quartus.

== Kyrie ==
The Kyrie section can be divided into Kyrie I, Christe, and Kyrie II.

=== Kyrie I ===
The texture starts small and all five voices eventually enter in imitation. It is duple meter and contains an abundance of thirds and sixths. The Cantus Firmus enters in the tenor in very long note values.

=== Christe ===
It is in duple meter and shows imitative polyphony. The voices also enter here in a well regulated manner and again the Cantus Firmus enters in long notes in the tenor. It includes a descending and ascending interval of a fifth, heard first in the bass, then the first tenor, alto and soprano, with the true augmented version in the second tenor.

=== Kyrie II ===
The second Kyrie is written in imitative polyphony in duple meter. Continuing elements of the song appear in the first tenor, soprano, alto and bass, with the second tenor introducing the Cantus Firmus in diminution with halved note-values.

== Gloria ==
The Gloria introduces the opening of the song from the first tenor, which is followed by the soprano, alto and bass. Each voice extends the characteristic opening figure as is imitated by the other voices. The second tenor (Quintus) enters with an augmented version of the unchanged theme and this procedure is followed through the movement.

== Credo ==
The L'homme armé cantus firmus appears in the Quintus part and is also used to fashion the imitative melodies in the other four voices. The texture is reduced at "Crucifixus," with the Quintus voice dropping out. It is restored of the setting of "Et in Spiritum sanctum."

== Sanctus ==
The Sanctus forms part of the prayer of consecration of the bread and wine. The image of such works usually conclude with words describing the praise of the worshippers joining with the angels, who are pictured as praising God with the words of the Sanctus. In Christianity the Sanctus is offered as a response by the choir during the Holy Anaphora. Composers of the late Renaissance began to work with freer and longer melodic lines. Imitation begins and is used between voices, and each singer's melody fluctuates less in pitch and becomes more tied to the text.

A listening chart explaining the Sanctus:

	Time	Description
Sanctus..	0:00	The sustained cantus firmus appears in the Tenor while other voices exhibit imitation.
Pleni sunt...	1:10	This is scored for a reduced texture of Cantus I, Cantus, II, Tenor, and Quintus. The Cantus Firmus appears in the Quintus part.
Hosanna..	2:35	The Cantus Firmus appears in both the Quintus and Bassus in canon. The texture reverts to five parts.
Benedictus...	0:00	The texture reduces to four voices and the Cantus Firmus is heard in the top line.
Hosanna..	1:05	The direction "Hosanna ut supra" indicates a repeat of the previous Hosanna.

== Agnus Dei ==
The Agnus Dei is split into two sections. Agnus Dei I and Agnus Dei II. In the first Agnus Dei, the Cantus Firmus appears in the Quintus and Bassus voices in canon. In the second Agnus Dei, the texture is expanded to include Cantus II and the Cantus Firmus appears in augmentation in the Quintus part.

== Bibliography ==
- Vartolo, S. PALESTRINA: Missa L'homme arme / CAVAZZONI: Ricercari. Available at http://www.naxos.com/mainsite/blurbs_reviews.asp?item_code=8.553315&filetype=About%20this%20Recording&language=English
- Palestrina: Kyrie from Missa L'Homme Arme. Available at http://toddtarantino.com/hum/palestrina
- Pierce, T. 2011. Music Literature: Antiquity through Renaissance. Available at http://www.nwmissouri.edu/library/owens/awards/2012/PierceTyler.pdf
