= Firminus Caron =

French composer

Firminus Caron (fl. 1460–1475) was a French composer, and likely a singer, of the Renaissance. He was highly successful as a composer and influential, especially on the development of imitative counterpoint, and numerous compositions of his survive. Most of what is known about his life and career is inferred.

== Life ==
Most musical manuscripts give his name only as "Caron." But his contemporary, the music theorist Johannes Tinctoris names him in three different treatises as "Firminus Caron" and the Vatican choirbook San Pietro B80 has "F. Caron" written above its copy of his Missa L'homme armé. Attempts in the past to identify him with people named Philippe Caron and Jean Caron are therefore to be discarded. Furthermore, a reference to "Firminus Caron" as primus musicus at Amiens cathedral in 1422 has now been shown to be misdated: his activity in Amiens is attested by numerous documents dating from 1459 to 1475 (when his father died). A document of 1473 names him "maistre Fremin le Caron," implying that he had a university master's degree, and that of 1475 names him "sire Fremin le Caron," meaning that he had been ordained a priest.

Some writers of the time, including Tinctoris, praised Caron. Most of Caron's music survives in Italian manuscripts, leading to the hypothesis that he may have spent some time in Italy, a common destination for composers from northern Europe: however many compositions by French composers made their way to Italian manuscripts without being carried there by their composers, so this is not certain.

In 1472 and 1473, Caron is mentioned by Loyset Compère alongside Guillaume Dufay, and stylistic similarities between the two composers suggests a relation. In addition, one of Caron's masses appears in a Cambrai manuscript dated to 1472 or 1473, the year before Dufay's death there. Caron may have been in Cambrai in the early 1470s and known Dufay, but even that is not certain. References to Caron in writings by music theorists appear as late as 1556, in the writings of German Hermann Finck, indicating the spread and duration of his reputation. Johannes Tinctoris, whose writings are a rich source on 15th-century composers and music theory, extravagantly praises Caron's music, but also mentions that he was poorly educated.

== Music and influence ==
Caron left both sacred and secular music, including five masses and numerous secular songs.

One of the earliest masses based on the famous tune L'homme armé is by Caron, and survives in an early 1460s Vatican Library manuscript along with L'homme armé masses by several other composers. In Caron's setting the tune is transposed to Dorian mode and elaborated considerably; the upper voices often sing in two-part imitation.

Most of his secular songs were in French, and for three voices, and most survive from Italian manuscripts. Most are rondeaux, and most are in duple meter. One of his songs, Helas que pourra devenir, was extraordinarily famous, and was the second-most-widely distributed song in manuscript sources of the third quarter of the 15th century (De tous biens plaine, by Hayne van Ghizeghem, was the first). It is unusual among songs of the time in using very close imitation, and it seems to have initiated a trend. David Fallows, writing in the New Grove, hypothesises that it may have originated as an instrumental fantasy.

== References and further reading ==
- David Fallows: "Firminus Caron", Grove Music Online, ed. L. Macy (Accessed July 2–4, 2006), (subscription access)
- Gustave Reese, Music in the Renaissance. New York, W.W. Norton & Co., 1954. ISBN 0-393-09530-4
- Wegman, Rob C. (2011). "Fremin le Caron at Amiens: New Documents". In Fitch, Fabrice; Kiel, Jacobijn (eds.). Essays on Renaissance Music in Honour of David Fallows. Woodbridge: The Boydell Press. pp. 10–32. ISBN 978-1-84383-619-3.
