= Johannes Regis =

Netherlandish composer

Johannes Regis (French: Jehan Leroy; c. 1425 – c. 1496) was a Franco-Flemish composer of the Renaissance. He was a well-known composer at the close of the 15th century, was a principal contributor to the Chigi Codex, and was secretary to Guillaume Dufay.

== Life ==
Nothing is known about his life until 1451, when he became choirmaster at the church of St Vincent, Soignies, near Mons in Hainaut. This was an important musical establishment at the time, and several famous composers either worked there or trained there, including Gilles Binchois, who was probably an associate of Regis. The earliest datable music by Regis is preserved in the choirbooks of Cambrai Cathedral, between 1462 and 1465, indicating that he may have begun working there then.

Between 1464 and 1474 he served as secretary to Guillaume Dufay, and possibly lived in Cambrai for much of this time. Also in the early 1470s he was mentioned as one of the major composers of the time by the theorist Johannes Tinctoris, indicating the spread of his reputation.

He probably died in early summer 1496, since his post was declared vacant then, and eliminated.

== Music ==
Although Regis was associated professionally with Guillaume Du Fay, his music is stylistically independent of Du Fay and is highly creative and technically innovative. Like his exact contemporary, Johannes Ockeghem, Regis liked to explore the low vocal register resulting in a very broad registral palette, and his music also evidences great harmonic and textural variety. Two masses, seven motets, and two secular songs, both rondeaux, by Regis have survived; some other music is mentioned by Tinctoris and other writers but is lost. One of his lost works is a Missa L'homme armé; dating from the 1450s; it is one of the earliest known masses based on this most popular of all tunes for mass composition. In addition to this lost mass, he wrote another based on the same tune, a Dum sacrum mysterium/Missa l'homme armé; this one has survived, and is a contrapuntal tour-de-force which uses up to three pre-existing melodies simultaneously in the four voices. Regis is one of the few composers known to have written more than one L'homme armé mass. Also among Regis' music for the mass is a single movement, Patrem Vilayge.

Regis' extended motet, Lux solemnis, Repleti sunt omnes, features a lengthy passage of call and answer bicinia dialogue between the upper two voices and the lower two voices, foreshadowing this technique that was made famous in the following generation by Josquin. Regis is one of the first composers to have written for five voices, a standard grouping in the music of the next generation (for example, in the music of Josquin des Prez). Indeed, his motets for five voices seem to have been used by the next generation, including Loyset Compère, Gaspar van Weerbeke, Josquin, and Jacob Obrecht as models for their own work.
