= Missa brevis (Palestrina) =

1570 mass by Giovanni Pierluigi da Palestrina

- Mass by Palestrina
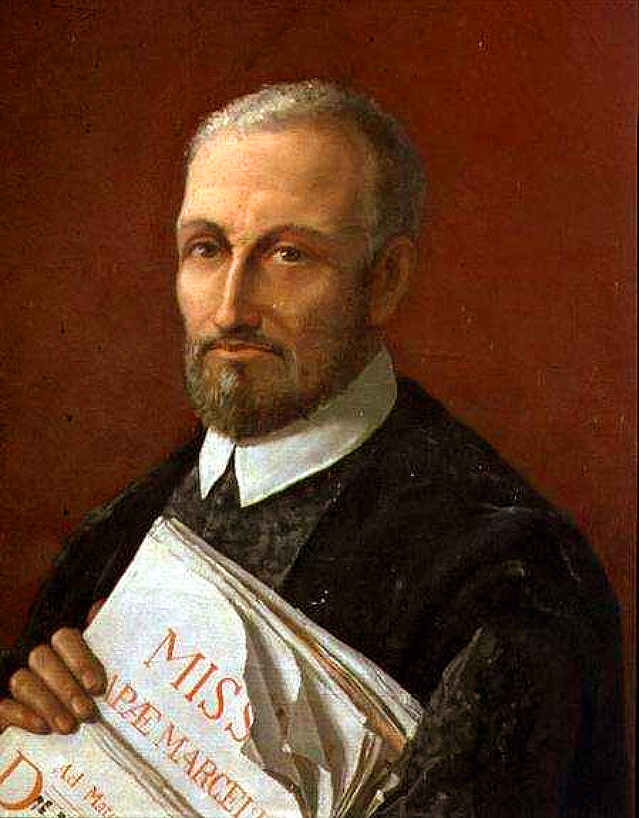
- The composer
- Published: 1570
- Scoring: SATB choir

The Missa brevis is a mass written by Giovanni Pierluigi da Palestrina first published in 1570 in Palestrina's Third Book of Masses and reprinted several times since. Its title may be misleading, as a missa brevis commonly refers to a short mass, which this is not. It is among the most performed of Palestrina's polyphonic repertoire.

== Structure ==
The Missa brevis is written for four voices: soprano, alto, tenor, and bass. The Benedictus, however, is for three voices, while the second Agnus Dei is for five. It is written in the key of F mode with B♭.

Movements:

- Kyrie
- Gloria
- Credo
- Sanctus
- Benedictus
- Agnus Dei 1 and 2

The work has frequent tempo changes characteristic of Palestrina's style, governed entirely by the changing meaning and significance of the text being sung. Accordingly, there is a greater feeling of phrase than of beat and rhythm in the work. Its unity of form reflects the peace and serenity that Palestrina had in his faith. How the mass came to be called Missa brevis is uncertain as the work is no shorter than a typical four-voice Palestrina mass. Haberl suggests that the term brevis was chosen because each movement opens on a breve. However, this was common practice at the time and may not merit note.

=== Kyrie ===
Four voices

Kyrie motif

The Kyrie begins with a sevenfold opening imitation, contrasts a new melody for the Christe section, and then closes with a motif similar to the first; the bass voice caps the movement with an extended, downward melodic sequence. The opening motif starts in the alto and is gradually repeated throughout by the other voices.

=== Gloria ===
Four voices

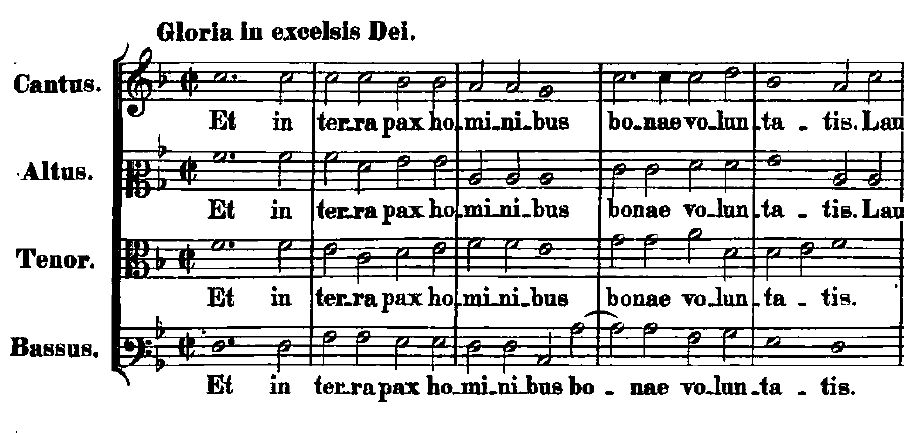
Gloria motif

In the Gloria movement, Palestrina introduces textural contrasts, carefully balancing chordal and imitative textures. The opening motif is sung simultaneously through all four voices and is three bars long. The lengthy text passes quickly with syllabic writing and "telescoping"; the only repetition comes at the end, once again with a bass sequence.

=== Credo ===
Four voices

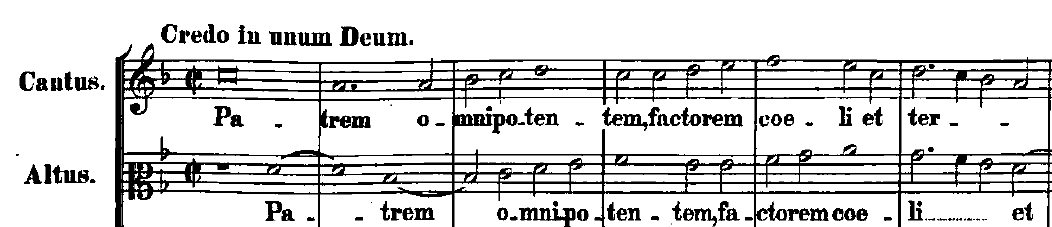
Credo motif

The Credo features balanced alternations between duet, trio, and full four-voiced textures, with a striking chordal homophony at the heart on the text "et incarnatus est." Once again a bass sequence marks the end. The opening motif is sung as a duet between alto and soprano voices before the tenor and alto sing a variation of the original motif.

=== Sanctus ===
Four voices

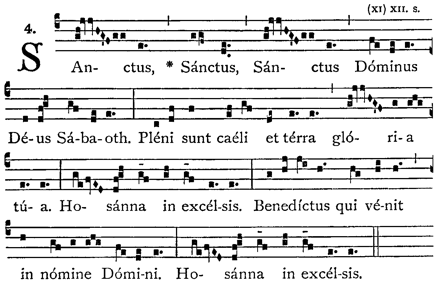
Gregorian mass XV

In the Sanctus Palestrina quotes the same chant melody (from the Gregorian Mass XV) as in the Missa Papae Marcelli; the movement's opening also resembles the melismatic Sanctus of that mass. A comparison of the two melodies is shown at right.

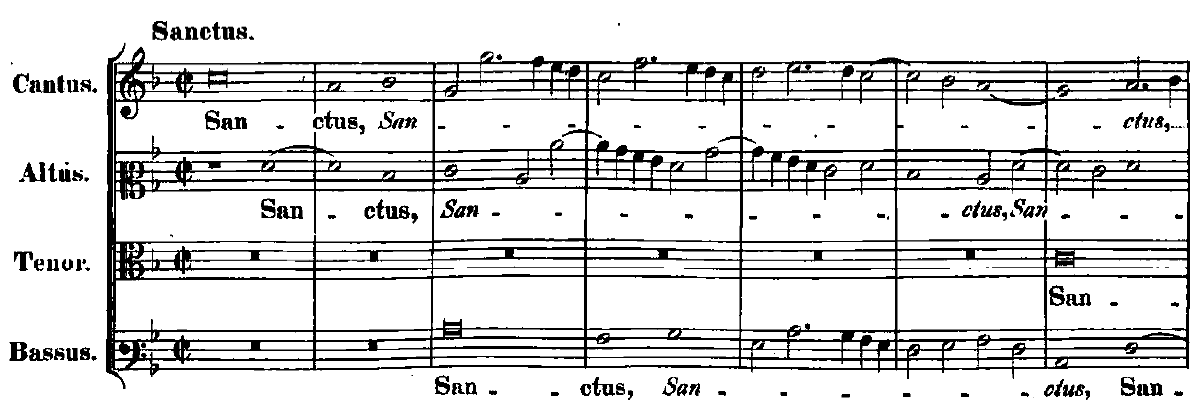
Sanctus motif

=== Benedictus ===
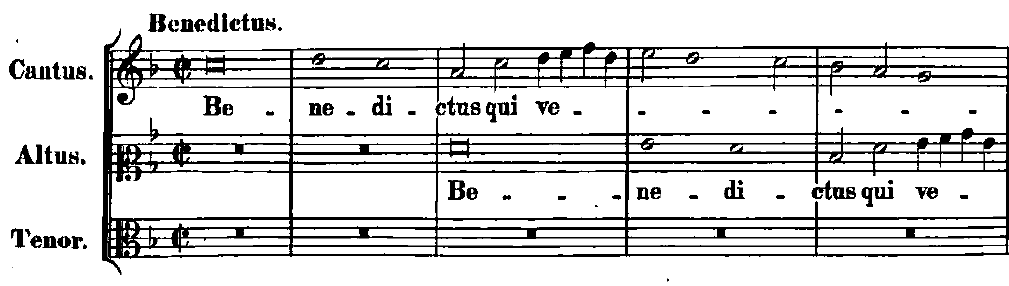
Benedictus motif

3 voices

The Benedictus is written for three voices, the soprano (cantus), the alto (altus), and the tenor. The opening motif is only three bars long before a variation on the melody is sung. Variations on this main melody are repeated throughout the piece.

=== Agnus Dei 1 and 2 ===
1: 4 voices

2: 5 voices

Palestrina rounds out the mass cycle with two Agnus Dei settings; the second expands the vocal texture by adding a second superius voice in canon with the cantus.

== Style ==
The Missa brevis is the epitome of Palestrina's style as it balances old and new modal usage of dissonances and accentuation while balancing imitative polyphony and homophonic textures. This is prominently displayed in Palestrina's use of many canti firmi at the start of each movement. This was innovative as it did not employ the traditional unified cantus firmus but instead favoured the parody technique, emphasising use of the imitation technique or homophonic texture or using both, to create a freely written mass.

The work lacks recurrent reference to the musical mode but is filled with repeating melodic features — notably, a descending minor third followed by a brief scalewise ascent (prominent in the opening of the Kyrie). There is a clear harmonic balance between the voices.

== History ==
It is likely that the Missa brevis was written about the year 1558. While some hold that the Missa brevis was a part of Palestrina's era of 'conceptual' and entirely original works, there are indications that the work could be based on a theme from Audi Filia, a mass by Claude Joudimel. Other indications suggest that it could come from the first notes of the Plainsong Credo I, while many parts of the mass recall the plainsong mass Cum Jubilo, especially the Sanctus.
