= Guillaume Faugues =

French Renaissance composer

Guillaume Faugues (fl. c. 1460–1475) was a French composer of Renaissance music.

== Life and career ==
Very little is known of his life, however, a significant representation of his work survives in the form of five mass settings (a large surviving repertoire for a composer of the time). Faugues holds an important place in the history of the Parody mass because of his use of the technique, particularly in Missa Le serviteur.

Faugues was a chaplain at Ste Chapelle in Bourges in 1462–1463, and was also master of the choirboys during that year, when he almost certainly met Johannes Ockeghem, who was visiting Bourges that year, and also taught Philippe Basiron who was then a choirboy.

Faugues is mentioned by two contemporaries: Loyset Compère includes him in his motet Omnium bonorum plena (before 1474), a piece which mentions the composers Compère respected, many of them from Cambrai Cathedral. Faugues was also praised by Johannes Tinctoris for his varietas, particularly as demonstrated in his Missa "Vinus vina vinum". Faugues' works were widely admired during his most active period, and he may have had a strong influence on the works of Johannes Martini.

== Works ==
- Missa L'homme armé (based on L'homme armé)
- Missa La basse danse (based on a basse danse)
- Missa Vinus vina vinum
- Missa Le serviteur
- Missa Je suis en la mer
