= Christopher Marshall (composer) =

New Zealand composer (born 1956)

Christopher Marshall (born 1956 in Paris, France) is a New Zealand classical music composer who resides in Orlando, Florida, United States.

His works include choral works, works for chamber ensemble, orchestral music and works for concert band, specifically wind ensembles, for which he is most notable. His most notable composition to date is L'homme armé: Variations for Wind Ensemble.

== Works ==
For orchestra

- The Song of Gaia, chamber orchestra (1987)
- Eastman Overture, orchestra (1996)
- Chaconne, orchestra (1998)
- Hikurangi Sunrise, orchestra (2000)
- Te Rerenga, orchestra (1998–2003)
- Symphonic Reflections, orchestra (2010)

Band ensemble / Wind ensemble

- Aue!, wind ensemble (2001)
- L'homme armé: Variations, wind ensemble (2003)
- U Trau, 2 wind ensembles and chorus (2004)
- Okaoka, wind ensemble (2004)
- Resonance, wind ensemble (2005)
- Rondorlando, wind ensemble (2007)
- You'll Never Walk Alone, soprano and wind ensemble (2007) [arrangement of Rodgers song]
- Dare To Hope, wind ensemble (2009)
- An Emily Dickinson Suite (9 miniatures), wind ensemble (2009)
- Light, 13 wind instruments/wind ensemble (2010)
- Heat Shimmer, wind ensemble/brass (2011)

For Chamber

- Schumannesque, cello choir (1985)
- Duo Sonata, cello and percussion (1986)
- Intermezzo, wind quintet (1987)
- Blood Wedding, incidental music, chamber ensemble (1993)
- Synergy, 2 flutes and piano (1993)
- Coruscation, 3 violas (1994)
- Three Aspects of Spring, violin, clarinet and piano (1995)
- Orlando Lakes (3 movements), tuba and euphonium (2009/2011)
- Raptures (2 movements), wind octet (2009)
- Alafaya Suite (4 movements), flute choir and saxophone quartet (2009)
- Songs Without Words (3 movements), string trio (2009)
- Birds of a Feather, flute choir (or fl's & cl's), sax quartet, marimba sextet and double bass (2011)
- 4 movements revised and arranged from An Emily Dickinson Suite, for wind ensemble, 2008
- Heat Shimmer, wind ensemble/brass (2011)
- Forténovem, 10 trumpets (2011)

For solo instruments

- Promenade, tuba and piano (1987)
- Elegy, viola (1994)
- Three Miniatures, cello and piano (1996)
- Homage, violin and piano (1996)
- Woman Rising, violin (2003)
- Could've, Should've, Would've, baritone saxophone (2009)
- Reflection, guitar (2010)

For piano/organ

- Intermezzo, piano (1975)
- Prelude and Fugue, fortepiano (1986)
- Scherzo, piano (1987)
- Souvenir, fortepiano (1995)
- Ataata, organ (2002)
- Second Thoughts, organ (2002)

Chorals

- Songs of Samoa (7 songs arranged), chorus (1984)
- Pastorale, male chorus, solo soprano, flute, oboe, English cor, clarinet, bass clarinet, bassoon and vibraphone (1987)
- To The Horizon: Images of New Zealand (12 songs), chorus (1989)
- Earth Song, female chorus (1990)
- The Desert Shall Blossom, chorus (1990)
- The Last Ones, chorus and piano (1993)
- Consider the Lilies, chorus (1993)
- The Water of Life, chorus and organ (1994)
- Kyrie Eleison: Gaia, soprano solo, chorus, piano, organ and percussion (1995)
- With Love at Christmas, chorus (1995)
- Christmas Carols from New Zealand (2 carols), chorus (and organ) (1996)
- La Rose, chorus w/baritone and high soprano soloists (1996)
- Real Gods (2 songs), chorus (1997)
- Levavi Oculos Meos, double chorus (1998)
- Cançó del Mar (Song of the Sea), double chorus, clarinet, bass clarinet, harp, violin, cello and double bass (1998)
- New Zealand Advent Triptych (3 anthems), chorus (1998)
- Bless This House!, chorus, organ, brass 3 trumpets, 2 trombones and percussion (1999)
- I Hold Your Hand In Mine, chorus (1999) [arrangement of Tom Lehrer song]

Tangi, chorus w/mezzo-soprano solo (2000)

- Epitaph, male chorus (2001)
- Tihei Mauri Ora! (6 songs), male chorus and clarinet (2003)
- Wings, chorus and piano (2004)
- O Fragile Human (5 songs), chorus (2005)
- Nobody, chorus (2006)
- Millennium Double (2 hymns), chorus (2006) [2 contrasting settings of Jocelyn Marshall's "Millennium Hymn"]
- Emily Songs (3 songs), chorus (2007)
- I'm Spending Hanukkah in Santa Monica, male chorus (2008) [arrangement of Tom Lehrer song]
- Alas For Those Who Never Sing, male chorus (2009)
- High Flight, chorus and alto saxophone (2009)
- Golden Carol, chorus (2009)
- This Big Moroccan Sea, chorus (2010)
- Lotā Nu'u (4 pieces), double a cappella chorus (SSATB) (2011) [texts: in the Samoan language]

Vocal

- Sea and Sky, bass voice and piano (1989)
- Flights of Fancy (8 songs), voice and piano (1994) [settings of 8 poems by New Zealand poets for "Haiku", "Suddenly September", "As I walked along", "Winged Memory", "A Fly", "Clear Sky" and "The Last Ones"]
- Fleeting Visions (4 songs), soprano and string quartet (1994) (songs "Boat Moored to a Willow", "Tree on the Cliffs", "A Fly", "On the Plains" with text by Ruth Dallas)
- Destinations (2 songs), bass voice, clarinet and piano (1994) (for "Landfall" and "Epitaph" with text by Robert Louis Stevenson)
- Spring and Fall, soprano and guitar (1995)
- O What Is That Sound?, tenor, piccolo and snare drum (1995)
- Time Out (2 songs), tenor, viola and piano (1999) (for "As I Walked Along The Street" text by Janet Frame and "Clear Sky", text by Ruth Dallas)
- You'll Never Walk Alone, soprano and wind ensemble (2007) [arrangement of Richard Rodgers song]

== Awards ==
- 1994 / 1995: Mozart Fellowship at Otago University
- 1995: Philip Neill Memorial Prize 1995 for Three Aspects of Spring
- 1997: Auckland Philharmonia Graduate Composer Workshops for Eastman Overture
- 2000: Douglas Lilburn Prize for Hikurangi Sunrise
- 2002: NZSO-SOUNZ Readings for The Song of Gaia
- 2004: NZSO-SOUNZ Readings for Te Rerenga

== Notes ==
- Chris Marshall, Tim Reynish, Fraser Linklater: Christopher Marshall – L'Homme Armé
