= Jehan Fresneau =

French composer

Jehan Fresneau (also Fresnau, Frasnau) (fl. ca. 1468 – 1505) was a French composer of the Renaissance. He was one of the composers in the renowned Milan chapel in the mid-1470s, which was disbanded after the assassination of Duke Galeazzo Maria Sforza.

== Life ==
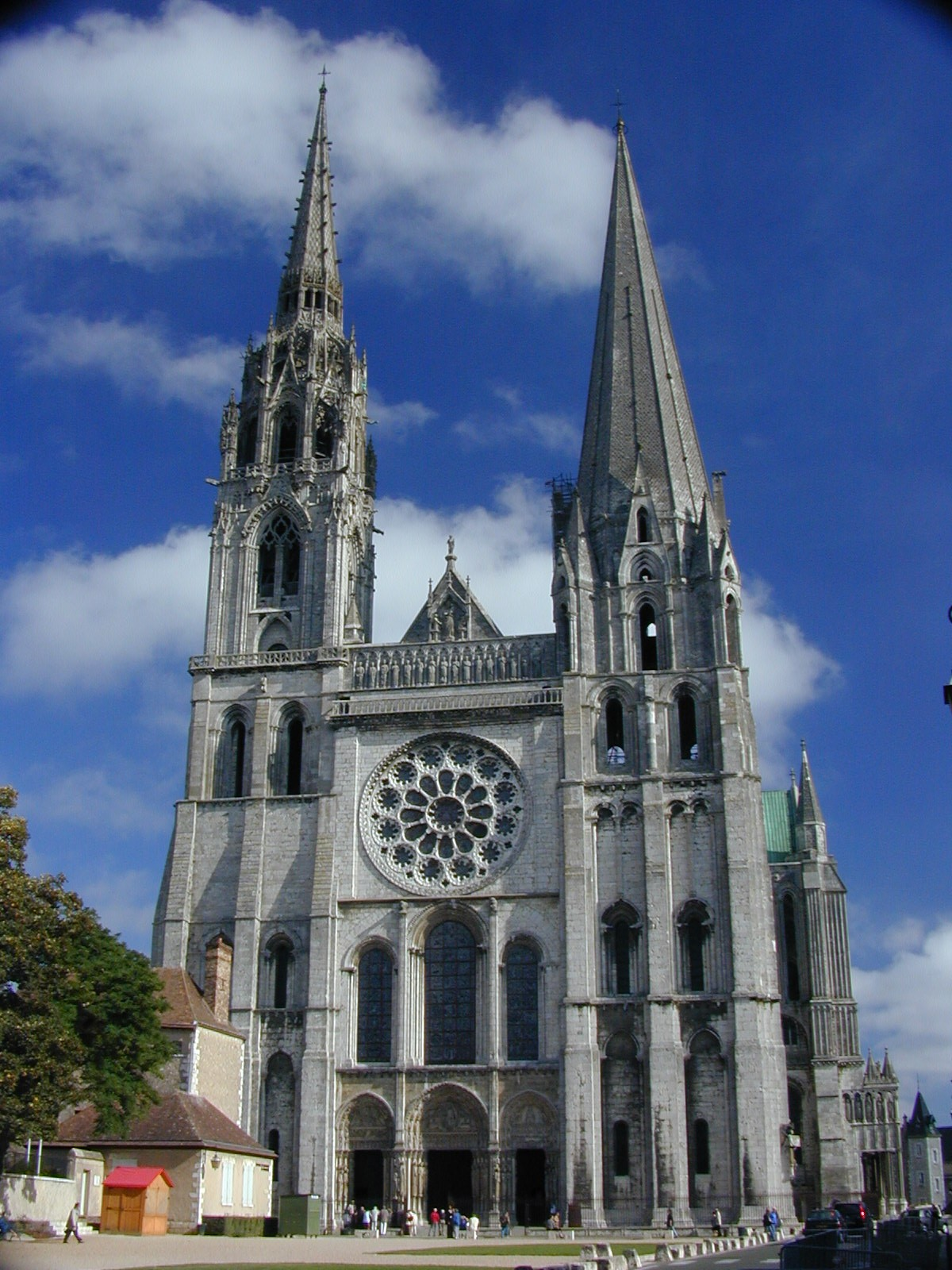
Chartres Cathedral; Fresneau worked at the choir school here late in his career

Fresneau was from Cambrai, and was probably a priest. A "Jo. Fremniau" active at Cambrai Cathedral from 1468 to 1469 has tentatively been identified as the same person. He was employed by the French royal chapel between 1469 and 1475, at which time he went to Milan; however, he did not stay there long, for in December 1476 Duke Galeazzo Maria Sforza was assassinated, and the many singers and composers of the chapel scattered. Fresneau was among those listed on a safe pass for exit from Milan on 6 February 1477, along with Loyset Compère, Johannes Martini, Colinet de Lannoy, and others. It is not known where he went immediately; his next documented appearance is at the church of St. Martin in Tours in 1486, where he was also in the employ of Louis XII. Between 1494 and 1505 he was at the singing school attached to Chartres Cathedral, where he held various positions, including canon, provost, notary, and procurator. No records documenting his life after 1505 have yet been found.

He is mentioned in Guillaume Crétin's elegy on the death of Johannes Ockeghem (6 February 1497) as one of the living composers; however, Crétin does not list him with the most prominent, which included Alexander Agricola, Johannes Ghiselin, Johannes Prioris, Josquin des Prez, Gaspar van Weerbeke, Antoine Brumel, and Loyset Compère. The term "nostre maistre" in Crétin's Déploration has been taken to suggest that all of these composers, including Fresnau, were students of Ockeghem.

== Music and manuscript sources ==
Of his music, only six examples survive, including five chansons and a setting of the mass. The mass, Missa quarti toni, is for four voices. The chansons, probably written in the 1470s, all use the formes fixes; all are in French, and all are for three voices. Several are preserved in the Florentine chansonnier I-Fr 2794, which contains 60 chansons and 8 pieces in Latin.

== Works ==
=== Sacred ===
- Missa quarti toni (four voices)

=== Secular ===
- C'est vous seulle (three voices)
- De vous servir (three voices) (also attributed to Hayne van Ghizeghem)
- Ha qu'il m'ennuye (three voices) (also attributed to Alexander Agricola)
- Notres assouemen (three voices (also attributed to Alexander Agricola)
- Nuit et jour (three voices)
- Perget (three voices) (contrafactum of Nuit et jour)
