= List of publications by Ottaviano Petrucci =

This is a list of all known publications by Ottaviano Petrucci, an influential Italian printer of the 16th century. Most of these were reprinted several times during Petrucci's life, but in this list only dates of first publication are given. Some of the earlier publications (for instance, the Josquin masses) were reprinted separately, in Fossombrone, after Petrucci moved there around 1510; these reprints are listed. The vast majority of Petrucci's publications were published in Venice; those from his Fossombrone years are marked accordingly.

== List of publications ==
=== Vocal ===
==== Secular ====
- Harmonice Musices Odhecaton A (1501; 2nd ed, 1503; 3rd ed, 1504)
- Canti B numero cinquanta (1502; 2nd ed, 1503)
- Canti C cento cinquanta (1504)
- Frottole I (1504)
- Frottole II (1505)
- Frottole III (1505)
- Frottole IV (1505)
- Frottole V (1505)
- Frottole VI (1506)
- Frottole VII (1507)
- Frottole IX (1509)
- Franciscus Bossinensis: Tenori e contrabassi intabulati col sopran in canto figurato per cantar e sonar col lauto I (1509)
- Franciscus Bossinensis: Tenori e contrabassi intabulati col sopran in canto figurato per cantar e sonar col lauto II (1511)
- Frottole X (1512, Fossombrone, lost)
- Frottole XI (1514, Fossombrone)
- Bernardo Pisano: Musica (1520, Fossombrone)

==== Sacred ====
===== Masses =====
- Josquin des Prez: Misse [I] (1502)
- Jacob Obrecht: Misse (1503)
- Antoine Brumel: Misse (1503)
- Johannes Ghiselin: Misse (1503)
- Pierre de La Rue: Misse (1503)
- Alexander Agricola: Misse (1504)
- Marbrianus de Orto: Misse (1505)
- Josquin des Prez: Misse II (1505)
- Fragmenta missarum (1505)
- Heinrich Isaac: Misse (1506)
- Gaspar van Weerbeke: Misse (1507)
- Missarum diversorum autorum I (1508)
- Messa corale (probably 1513, Fossombrone)
- Josquin des Prez: Misse III (1514, Fossombrone)
- Josquin des Prez: Misse II (1515, Fossombrone)
- Jean Mouton: Misse I (1515, Fossombrone)
- Antoine de Févin: Misse (1515, Fossombrone)
- Missarum decem libri duo (1515, Fossombrone, lost)
- Josquin des Prez: Misse I (1516, Fossombrone)

===== Motets =====
- Motetti A (1502)
- Motetti de passione [...] B (1503)
- Motetti C (1504)
- Motetti IV (1505)
- Motetti a cinque I (1505)
- Motetti de la corona [I] (1514, Fossombrone)
- Motetti de la corona II (1519, Fossombrone)
- Motetti de la corona III (1519, Fossombrone)
- Motetti de la corona IV (1519, Fossombrone)

===== Other genres =====
- Lamentationum Jeremie I (1506)
- Lamentationum Jeremie II (1506)
- Magnificats I (1507, lost)
- Johannes Martini: Hymnorum I (1507, lost)
- Laude II (1508)
- Dammonis: Laude I (1508)

=== Lute ===
- Francesco Spinacino: Intabolatura de lauto I (before 27 March 1507)
- Francesco Spinacino: Intabolatura de lauto II (1507)
- Giovanni Maria Alemanni: Intabolatura de lauto III (1508, lost)
- Joan Ambrosio Dalza: Intabolatura de lauto IV (1508)
- Franciscus Bossinensis: Tenori e contrabassi I (1509)
- Franciscus Bossinensis: Tenori e contrabassi II (1511, Fossombrone)

=== Non-musical ===
- Paulus de Middelburgh: Paulina de recta Paschae (1513, Fossombrone)
- Baldassare Castiglione: Epistola de vita (1513, Fossombrone)
- Paulus de Middelburgh: Parabola Christi (1516, Fossombrone)
- Hippocrates, trans. Calvo (1519?, Fossombrone)
