= 1500s in music =

| List of years in music | (table) |
- … 1490; 1491; 1492; 1493; 1494; 1495; 1496; 1497; 1498; 1499; 1500; 1501; 1502; 1503; 1504; 1505; 1506; 1507; 1508; 1509; 1510 …
- In art 1497 1498 1499 1500 1501 1502 1503
- Art; Archaeology; Architecture; Literature; Music; Philosophy; Science; +...

- 1490s
- 1500s in music
- 1510s
Other topics in 1500s:

The first decade of the 16th century marked the creation of some significant compositions. These were to become some of the most famous compositions of the century.

== Events ==
- 1501:
  - April 28 – Bartolomeo Tromboncino receives an unhelpful letter of reference from Francesco II Gonzaga, Marquess of Mantua, after abandoning his position at the Mantua court without permission for the second time.
  - May – Francisco de Peñalosa receives an increase in salary to 30,000 maravedis, the maximum paid to a singer-chaplain in the royal chapel of Ferdinand II of Aragon.
  - June 1 – Antoine Brumel is hired as a singer at the court of Philibert II, Duke of Savoy at Chambéry.
  - September – Jean Mouton begins a short tenure at the collegiate church of St André in Grenoble, teaching plainchant and polyphony to choirboys.
  - October 16 – Nikolaus Decius matriculates at Leipzig University.
  - exact date unknown – Robert Fayrfax graduates with a MusB at Cambridge University.
- 1502:
  - June 1 – Antoine de Longueval joins the chapel of Philibert II, Duke of Savoy, at a salary half again higher than any other singer.
  - exact date unknown – Adam of Fulda matriculates at the newly founded University of Wittenberg
- 1503: Pierre de la Rue, Alexander Agricola and Henry Bredemers travel to Heidelberg with the Habsburg court, where they most probably meet Arnolt Schlick.
- April 1503: Josquin des Prez leaves France and is employed by Ercole d'Este I in Ferrara; he leaves for Condé-sur-l'Escaut in April 1504.
- 1504:
  - May 3 – Josquin des Prez arrives in Condé-sur-l'Escaut to assume the post of Provost of the collegiate church of Notre Dame, recently vacated by Pierre Duwez.
  - Jacob Obrecht succeeds Josquin des Prez as maestro di capella in Ferrara.
- June 1505: After the death of Ercole d'Este and the succession of Alfonso I as Duke of Ferrara, Obrecht finds himself unemployed, but before he can secure another post, contracts the plague and dies scarcely a month after his employer.
- 1506:
  - June 5 – Heinrich Glarean begins his studies at the University of Cologne.
  - June 19 – On the recommendation of Emperor Maximilian I, Hans Buchner is appointed organist of the cathedral of Konstanz.
  - exact date unknown – Antoine Brumel settles in Ferrara, replacing Jacob Obrecht (who died in July 1505) at Alfonso I's court.
- 1507: Paul Hofhaimer settles in Augsburg, where he could be closer to Roman emperor Maximilian I whom he served as organist

== Publications ==
- 1501: Harmonice musices odhecaton A, the first printed collection of polyphonic music, published by Ottaviano Petrucci in Venice. It was followed by two more volumes, in 1502 and 1503.
- 1502: Josquin des Prez – Misse Josquin, published by Ottaviano Petrucci, including the Missa L'homme armé super voces musicales
- 1503:
  - Antoine Brumel – 4 Masses for four voices (Venice: Ottaviano Petricci)
  - Johannes Ghiselin – Misse Ioannis Ghiselin for four voices (Venice: Ottaviano Petrucci)
  - Jacob Obrecht – Misse Obrecht for four voices (Venice: Ottaviano Petrucci)
  - Pierre de la Rue – Misse Petri de la Rue for four voices (Venice: Ottaviano Petrucci)
  - Gregoire – Ave verum corpus/Ecce panis angelorum/Bone pastor/O salutaris hostia, motet for four voices (Venice: Ottaviano Petrucci)
- 1504: Alexander Agricola – Misse Alexandri agricole (Venice: Ottaviano Petrucci)
- 1507: Francesco Spinacino – Intabolatura de lauto (two volumes), the earliest known publication of lute music
- 1508: Joan Ambrosio Dalza – Intabolatura de lauto libro quarto, published by Ottaviano Petrucci, including the earliest known publication of music for the pavane
- 1509: Franciscus Bossinensis – First book of Tenori e contrabassi intabulati col sopran in canto figurato per cantar e sonar col lauto (Venice: Ottaviano Petrucci)

== Compositions ==
- 1501: Loyset Compère – Gaude prole regia/Sancta Catharina, ceremonial motet for five voices, written for the reception of Duke Philip the Fair, in his capacity of Governor of the Netherlands, in Paris on November 25.
- 1502: Josquin des Prez – Salve regina, for five voices.
- 1503–04: Josquin des Prez
  - Miserere mei Deus (Psalm 50/51), for five voices
  - Virgo salutiferi (motet)
- 1504: August – Bartolomeo Tromboncino, "Sì è debile il filo", frottola, and the earliest known setting of a Petrarchan canzone; later published in Petrucci's seventh book of frottolas (Venice, 1507).
- 1507: Heinrich Isaac – Virgo prudentissima, motet for six voices

== Births ==
- 1500:
  - November 3, Benvenuto Cellini, cornettist and recorder player, best known as a goldsmith and sculptor (died February 13, 1571)
  - probable
    - Arnold von Bruck, Franco-Flemish composer (died 1554)
    - Cristóbal de Morales, Spanish composer (died 1553)
- 1502: July 27 – Francesco Corteccia, Italian composer (died 1571)
- c. 1505
  - Thomas Tallis, English composer (died 1585)
  - Christopher Tye, English composer and organist (died c. 1572)
- c. 1507: Jacques Arcadelt, Franco-Flemish composer (died 1568)

== Deaths ==
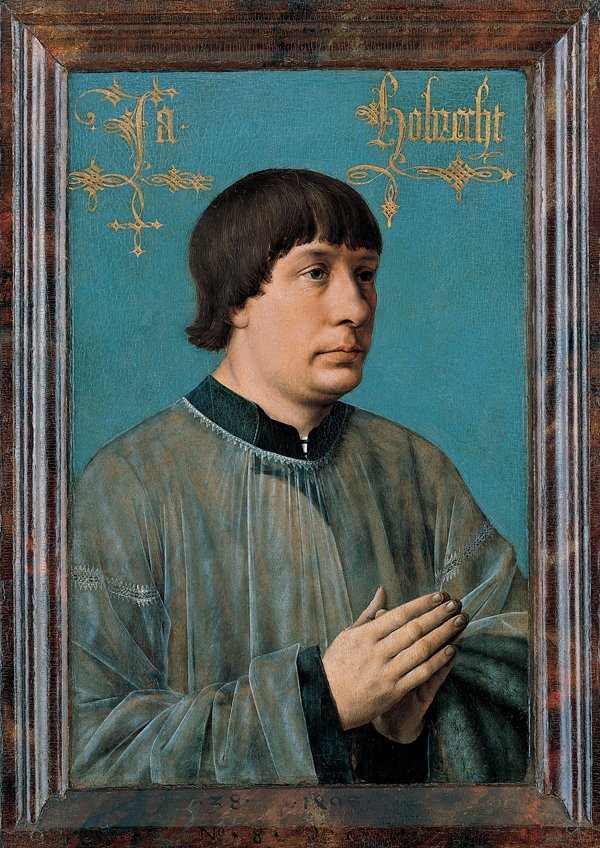
Jacob Obrecht

- 1500: estimated – John Browne, English composer of music from the Eton Choirbook (born c. 1453)
- 1501: February 17 – Stephan Plannck, German music printer active in Italy (born c. 1457)
- 1505
  - date unknown – Adam of Fulda, German composer and theoretician (born c. 1445; plague)
  - July – Jacob Obrecht, Flemish composer (born 1457 or 1458; plague)
- 1506:
  - May 2 – Johannes von Soest, German composer (born 1448)
  - August 15 – Alexander Agricola, Flemish composer (born c. 1445; plague)
- 1507: late February – Francisco de la Torre, Spanish composer (possibly plague)
