= Casanatense chansonnier =

Collection of Renaissance vocal music (c. 1480)

The Casanatense chansonnier (I-Rc MS 2856) was a major collection of Renaissance vocal music made in Ferrara c. 1480, including compositions from Europe's leading composers.

== Overview ==
It was likely compiled for Isabella d'Este's marriage to Francesco II Gonzaga. It included works from a wide variety of composers, including musicians in Italy such as Alexander Agricola, Loyset Compère, Jean Japart and Johannes Martini, as well as French and Netherlandish composers such as Antoine Busnois, Hayne van Ghizeghem, Josquin des Prez and Johannes Ockeghem.

Among the compositions included is Josquin's popular Adieu mes amours.
