= Capirola Lutebook =

16th-century Italian lute manuscript

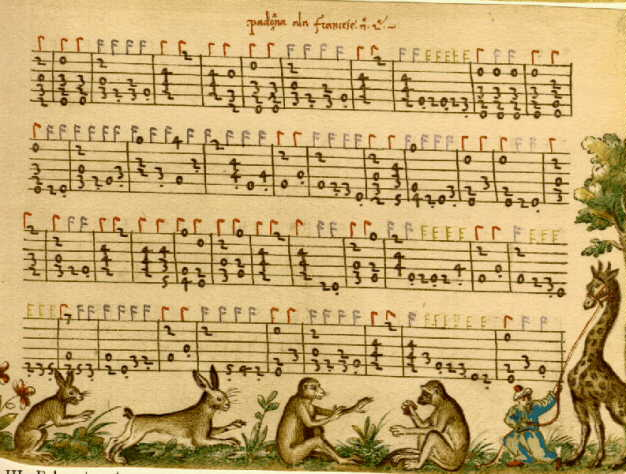
Folio 47r from the Capirola Lutebook: Padoana alla Francese.

The so-called Capirola Lutebook is one of the most important sources of early 16th century Italian lute music. It is an illuminated manuscript which comprises the entire surviving output of Vincenzo Capirola.

The Capirola Lutebook was compiled in 1520 by Vitale, a pupil of Capirola. The compositions included probably date from around 1517. There are 42 folios; the manuscript begins with a short note by its creator, one Vitale (Vidal), pupil of Capirola's. Vitale informs the reader that he adorned the lutebook with paintings to ensure its survival: even owners not interested in musical matters would, by Vitale's reasoning, keep the lutebook in their collections because of the paintings. This explanation is followed by a substantial text on lute playing technique, ornaments and notation—one of the most important sources on performance practice of the time. The actual music starts at folio 5. The lutebook contains the following works (for intabulations, composers of vocal originals are given):

1. La villanella
2. Recercar 1
3. Oublier veuil (Alexander Agricola)
4. Recercar 2
5. O mia cieca e dura sorte (Marchetto Cara)
6. Che farala, che dirala (Michele Vincentino)
7. La spagna 1
8. Recercar 3
9. Sit nomen domini (Johannes Prioris)
10. Padoana francese
11. Stavasi amor dormento (Bartolomeo Tromboncino)
12. Voi che passate qui (Bartolomeo Tromboncino)
13. Balletto
14. De tous biens plaine (Hayne van Ghizeghem)
15. Sancta Trinitas (Antoine de Févin)
16. Canto Bello
17. Recercar 4
18. Padoana
19. Recercar 5
20. Recercar 6
21. Christe de "Si Dedero" (Jacob Obrecht)
22. Allez regretz (Hayne van Ghizeghem)
23. Agnus dei (Antoine Brumel, from Missa Ut re mi fa sol la)
24. Recercar 7
25. La spagna 2
26. Recercar 8
27. Recercar 9
28. Recercar 10
29. Padoana alla francese
30. Recercar 11 alla spagnola
31. Non ti spiaqua l'ascoltar
32. Gentil prince
33. Nunca fué pena major (Juan de Urrede)
34. Et Resurrexit (Josquin des Prez, from Missa L'homme armé)
35. O florens rosa (Johannes Ghiselin)
36. Si dedero (Alexander Agricola)
37. Benedictus "Ut re mi fa sol la" (Antoine Brumel, from Missa Ut re mi fa sol la)
38. Bassadanza la spagna
39. Et in terra (Josquin des Prez, from Missa Pange lingua)
40. Qui tollis peccata mundi (Josquin des Prez, from Missa Pange lingua)
41. Recercar 12
42. Recercar 13
43. Tota pulchra es (Nicholas Craen)

The music varies in difficulty from very easy pieces (intended, as Vitale observes, for teaching purposes) to virtuosic toccata-like works. The thirteen ricercars of the book stylistically stand between the earliest, improvisatory examples and Francesco da Milano's ricercars, which exhibit a more advanced imitative technique. The manuscript is notable not only for the place Capirola occupies in lute repertoire, but also for the earliest known dynamic indications: for instance, the indication tocca pian piano appears in "Non ti spiaqua l'ascoltar". However, Capirola's seems to be an isolated example.
