= 1510s in music =

List of years in music	(table)
- … 1500; 1501; 1502; 1503; 1504; 1505; 1506; 1507; 1508; 1509; 1510; 1511; 1512; 1513; 1514; 1515; 1516; 1517; 1518; 1519; 1520 …
- In art 1507 1508 1509 1510 1511 1512 1513
- Art; Archaeology; Architecture; Literature; Music; Philosophy; Science; +...

- 1500s
- 1510s in music
- 1520s
Other topics in 1510s:

The decade of the 1510s in music (years 1510–1519) involved some significant events.

== Events ==
- 1513: Jacques Champion replaces Noel Bauldeweyn as magister cantorum at St Rombouts, Mechelen.
- 1517:
  - March – Heinrich Finck sends greetings from Mühldorf, Bavaria, to the humanist Joachim Vadian.
  - April 15 – Juan García de Basurto is hired as a singer by the cathedral chapter of Tarazona, at an annual salary of 1200 sueldos.
  - June – Silvestro Ganassi dal Fontego joins the pifferi of the Venetian government as a "contralto".
  - Sixt Dietrich is forced to leave Freiburg because of debts, but in November is appointed informator choralium by the cathedral chapter in Konstanz.
- 1518: Composer Ludwig Senfl loses a toe in a hunting accident.

== Publications ==
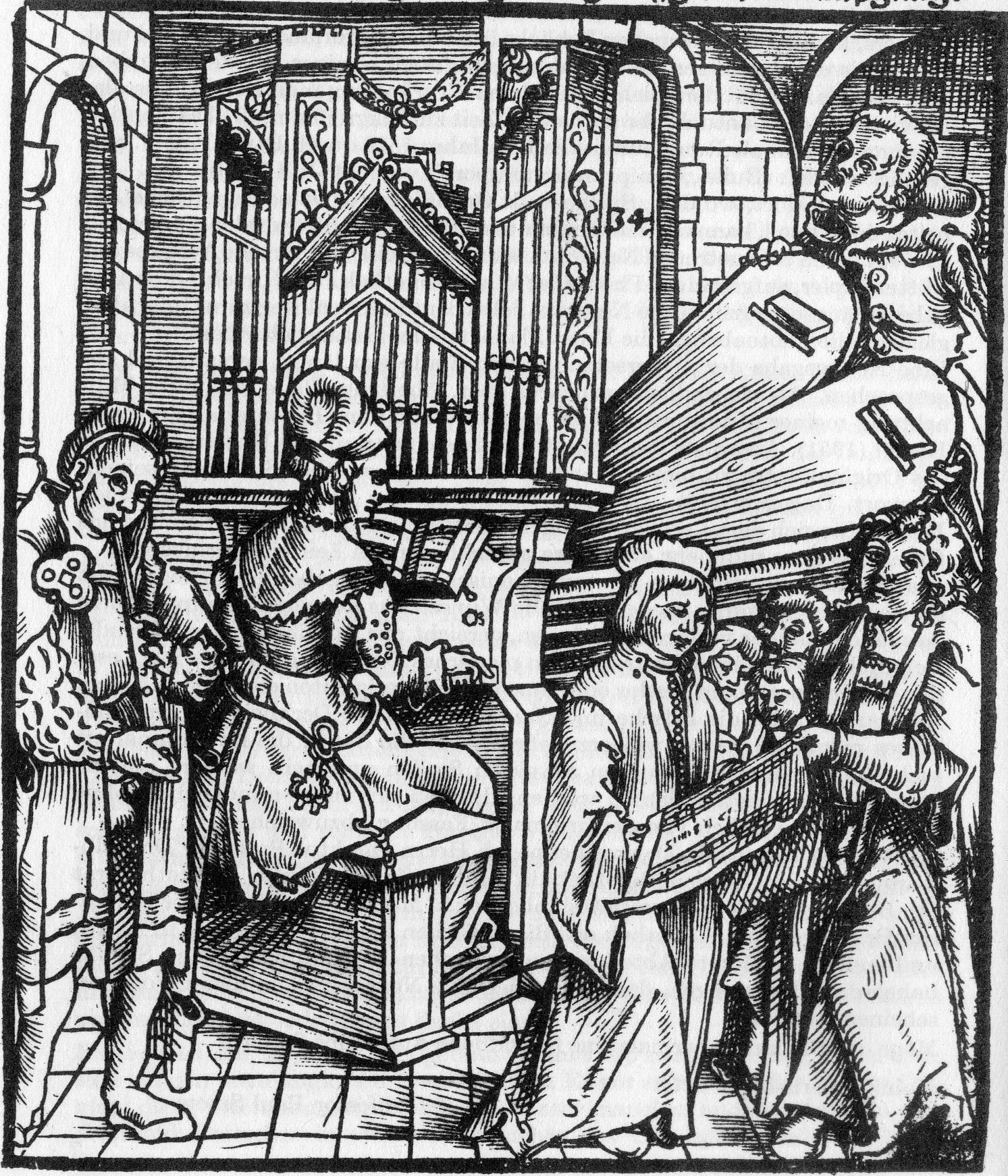
Illustration from the title page of Arnolt Schlick's Spiegel der Orgelmacher und Organisten (1511), the first German treatise on organ building and performance

- 1511:
  - Franciscus Bossinensis – Tenori e contrabassi intabulati col sopran in canto figurato per cantar e sonar col lauto, Libro secundo (Venice: Ottaviano Petrucci)
  - Arnolt Schlick – Spiegel der Orgelmacher und Organisten, the first treatise on organ-making in German
  - Sebastian Virdung – Musica getutscht und angezogen, published in Basel, the first European treatise entirely devoted to the subject of musical instruments.
- 1512: Arnolt Schlick – Tabulaturen etlicher lobgesang, a collection of organ and lute pieces
- 1515: Antoine de Févin – Masses (Fossombrone: Ottaviano Petrucci), also includes one mass by Pierre de la Rue (Quarti toni)
- 1517:
  - Andreas Ornithoparchus – Musicae activae micrologus (Leipzig).
  - Sebastian z Felsztyna – Opusculum musicae compilatum (Kraków: Johann Haller).
- 1518:
  - The Medici Codex (manuscript)
  - Franchinus Gaffurius – De harmonia musicorum instrumentorum opus. Milan.

== Compositions ==
- 1510: Josquin des Prez assembles or composes Missa de Beata Virgine, a musical setting of the Ordinary of the Mass, and it becomes the most popular of his masses in the 16th century.
- 1513: Heinrich Isaac – Optime pastor, motet celebrating the meeting in December of Maximilian I's Chancellor, Cardinal Lang, and the newly elected Pope Leo X
- 1514: Costanzo Festa – Quis dabit oculis, funeral ode for Anne of Brittany, Queen of France
- 1519: Adrian Willaert – Quid non ebrietas designat, setting of Horace's fifth epistle, for four voices

== Births ==
=== 1510 ===
- Juan Bermudo, Spanish music theorist (died 1565)
- Antonio de Cabezón, Spanish composer and organist of the Renaissance (died 1566)
- probable – Loys Bourgeois, French composer, famous for his Protestant hymn tunes (died c.1561)
- probable – Gian Domenico del Giovane da Nola, Neapolitan composer, famous for his villanescas and villanellas in the Neapolitan style (died 1592)

=== 1511 ===
- date unknown – Nicola Vicentino, Italian music theorist and composer (died 1575/1576)

=== 1513 ===
- February 14 – Domenico Ferrabosco, Italian composer and singer (died 1574)
- May 16 – Antonfrancesco Doni, Italian writer, academic and musician (died 1574)

=== 1516 ===
- probable – Cipriano de Rore, Flemish composer (died 1565)

=== 1517 ===
- January 17 – Antonio Scandello, Italian composer and instrumentalist (died 1580)
- January 31 or March 22 – Gioseffo Zarlino, Venetian theorist (died 1590)

== Deaths ==
- 1513: January – Hans Folz, German Meistersinger, barber, and surgeon (born ?before 1440)
- 1517: March 26 – Heinrich Isaac, Franco-Flemish composer (born c.1445)
