= Franchinus Gaffurius =

Italian music theorist and composer (1451–1522)

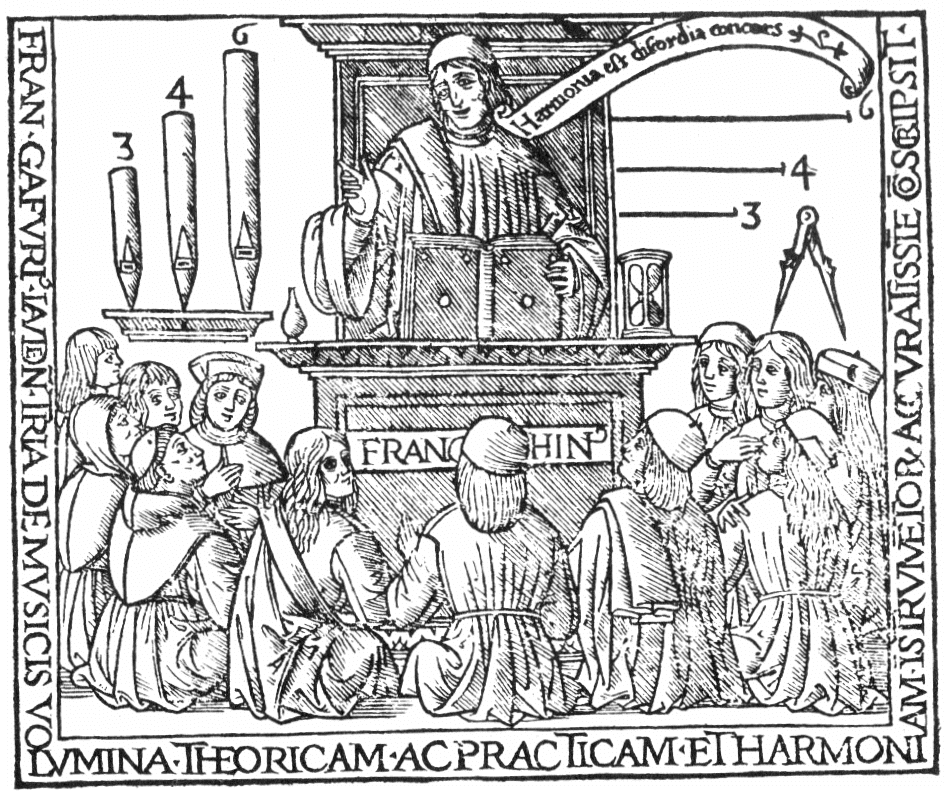
Woodcut of Gaffurius among twelve students in De Harmonia musicorum instrumentorum (1518).

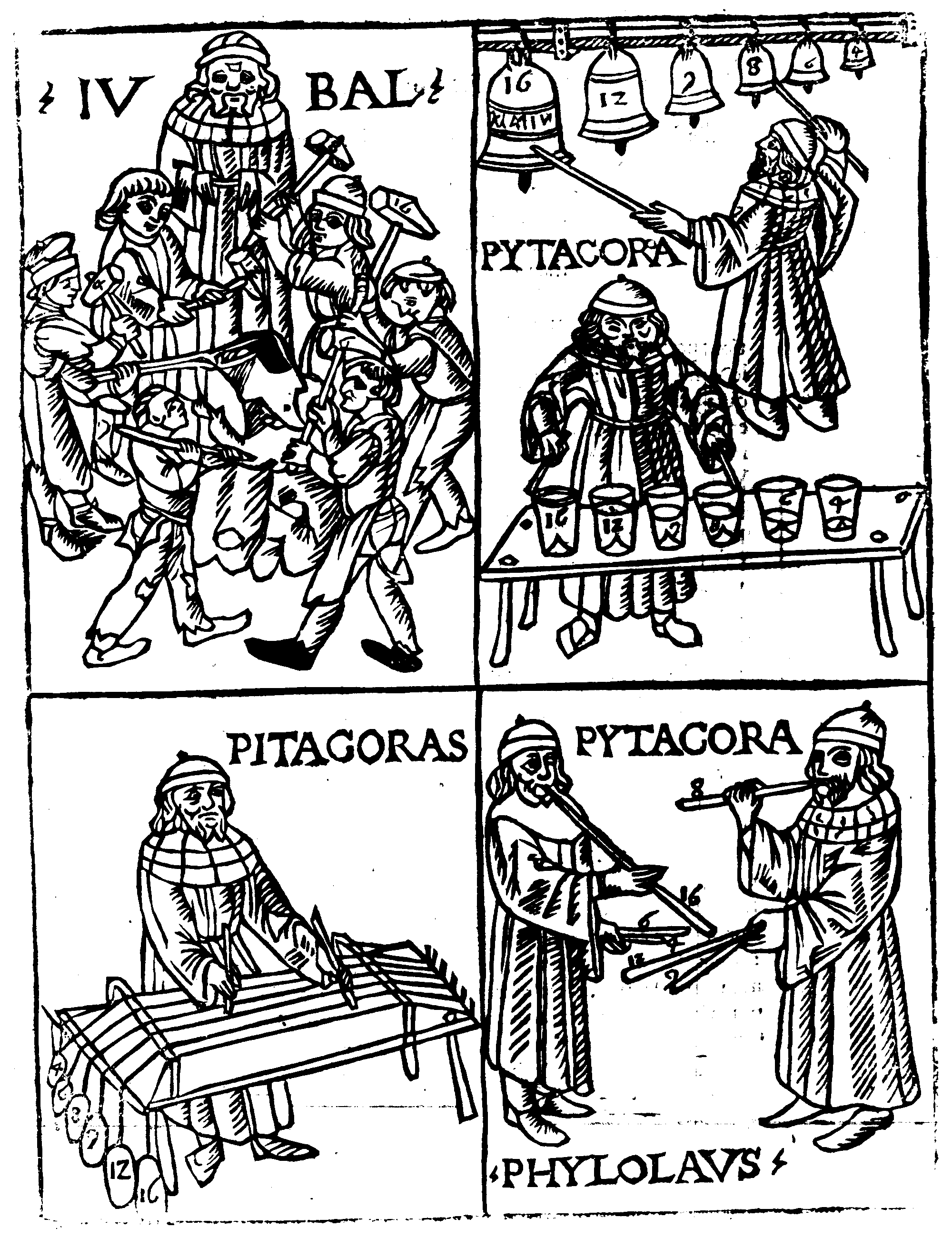
A page from his book Theorica musicae

Franchinus Gaffurius (Franchino Gaffurio; 14 January 1451 – 25 June 1522) was an Italian music theorist and composer of the Renaissance.

== Life ==
He was born in Lodi to an aristocratic family. Early in life he entered a Benedictine monastery, where he acquired his early musical training; later he became a priest. Later he lived in Mantua and Verona before settling in Milan as the maestro di cappella at the cathedral there, a position which he accepted in January 1484.

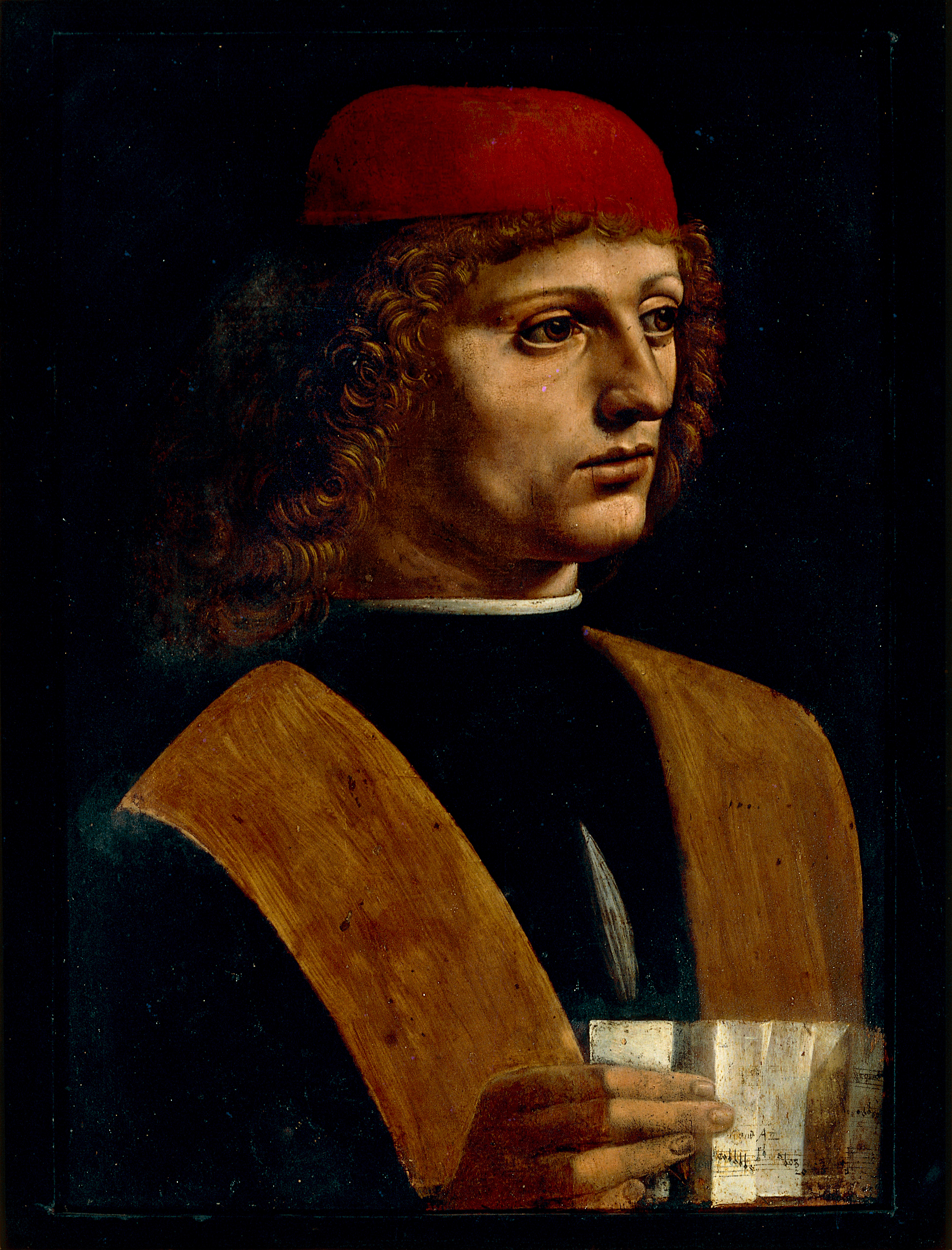
Portrait of a Musician by Leonardo da Vinci, once thought to be of Franchinus Gaffurius, now of an unknown musician in Milan in the 1480s

During the previous decade the Sforza family, using the composer Gaspar van Weerbeke as a recruiter, had built the choir at their chapel in Milan into one of the largest and most distinguished musical ensembles in Europe: composer-singers such as Alexander Agricola, Loyset Compère and Johannes Martini had all been employed there. While the membership of the choir at the Milan cathedral was mostly Italian, the cross-influence between his choir and the group at the Sforza chapel was significant. Gaffurius retained the post at the cathedral for the rest of his life, and it was in Milan that he knew both Josquin des Prez and Leonardo da Vinci.

== Writings ==
Gaffurius was widely read, and showed a strong Renaissance humanist bent. In addition to having a thorough understanding of contemporary musical practice, he met composers from all over Europe, since he had the good fortune to be living and working at one of the centers of activity for the incoming Netherlanders. His books have a pedagogical intent, and provide a young composer with all the techniques necessary to learn his art.

The major treatises of his years in Milan are three: Theorica musicae (1492), Practica musicae (1496), and De harmonia musicorum instrumentorum opus (1518). The second of these, the Practica musicae, is the most thorough, proceeding through subjects as diverse as ancient Greek notation, plainchant, mensuration, counterpoint, and tempo. One of his most famous comments is that the tactus, the tempo of a semibreve, is equal to the pulse of a man who is breathing quietly—presumably about 72 beats per minute.

== Music ==
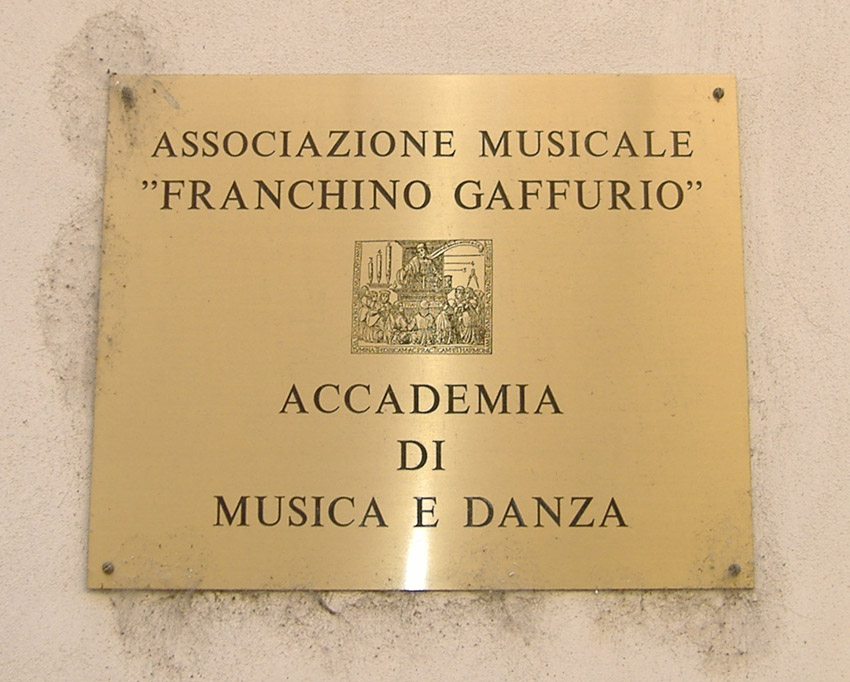
The entrance of Musical Association Franchino Gaffurio in Lodi

Gaffurius wrote masses, motets, settings of the Magnificat, and hymns, mainly during his Milan years. Some of the motets were written for ceremonial occasions for his ducal employer; many of the masses show the influence of Josquin, and all are in flowing Netherlandish polyphony, though with an admixture of Italian lightness and melody. His music was collected in four codices under his own direction.

== Selected recordings ==
- Franchino Gaffurio Missa de Carneval Motets: Stabat Mater, Adoramus Te, Imperatrix reginarum, Imperatrix gloriosa, Florem ergo, Res miranda, Salve Regina, Lamentatio, Magnificat, O sacrum convivium, Quando venit, Ave corpus. Il Convitto Armonico, Baschenis Ensemble, Stefano Buschini. Tactus 2012
