= Allez regrets =

Song

"Allez regrets" is a chanson usually credited to Franco-Flemish composer Hayne van Ghizeghem. Together with the composer's "De tous biens plaine", this was one of the most famous chansons of the age, and was much used as a basis for variation and as a cantus firmus for mass settings.

Cholji (ref. 1) lists five chanson settings, including those by Alexander Agricola and Loyset Compere, and five mass settings, including that by Josquin
