= Adieu mes amours =

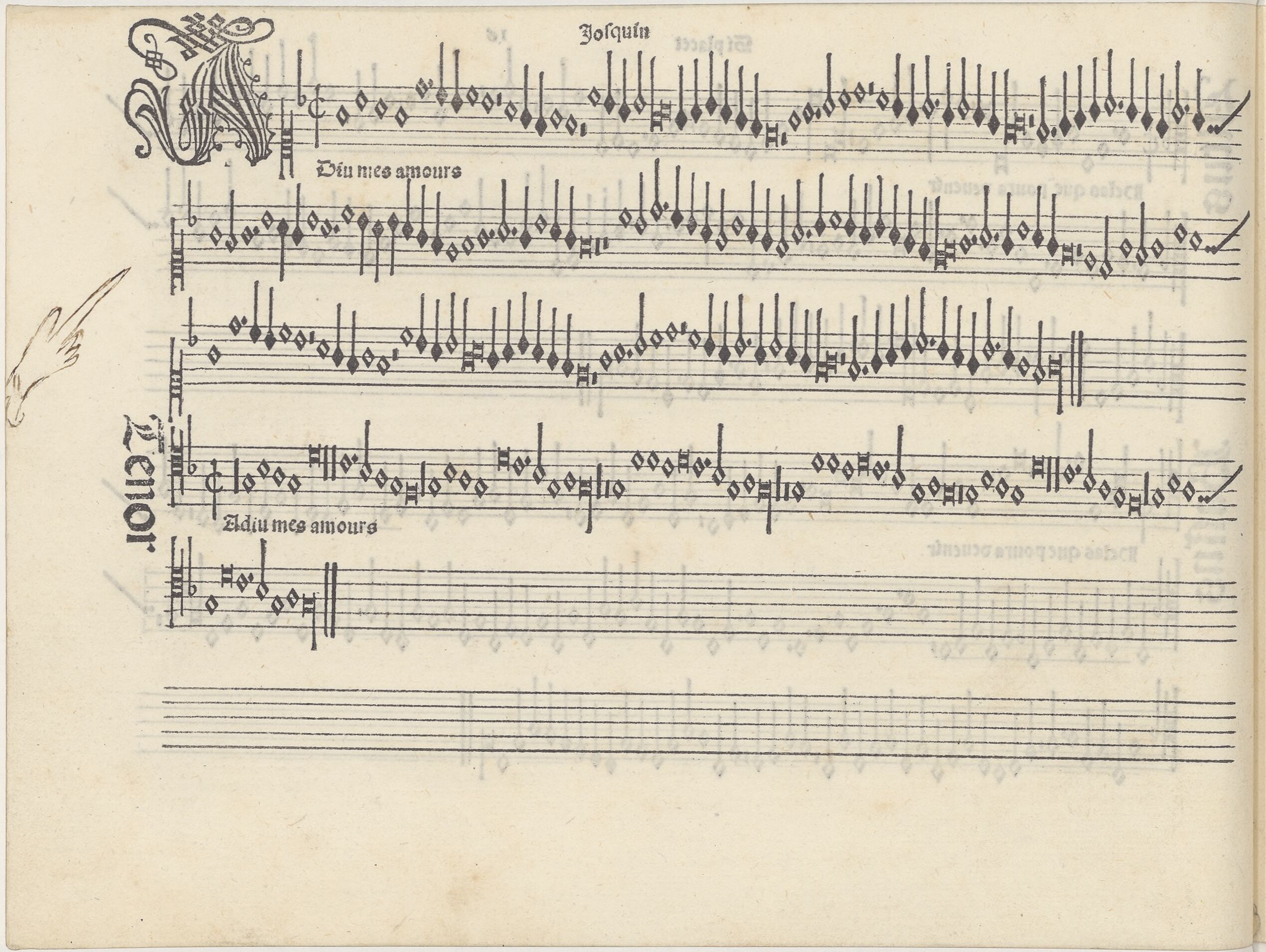
Cantus and Tenor of "Adieu mes amours" from Petrucci's Odhecaton

Adieu mes amours was a popular secular polyphonic chanson of the late 15th century. Many settings of this tune are in fact based on the c. 1480 setting by Josquin des Prez, in which the lower two voices are in quasi-canon, and the upper two voices are freer. The tune itself is in a simple ABA' form. It appeared in many manuscripts and prints from many countries, including in Ottaviano Petrucci's Odhecaton A.

== Josquin's version ==
Josquin's chanson was used as the basis for works by a number of other composers, including a version by Heinrich Isaac, and the five-voice chanson "Vous seulement" by Simon Moreau. The setting by Jean Mouton seems to be unrelated to the setting by Josquin. Although "Adieu mes amours" was originally a secular chanson, it was used in a number of mass settings such as, Missa "Adieu mes amours" which uses both parody and cantus firmus compositional techniques by Francesco de Layolle, and another Missa "Adieu mes amours" by Jacob Obrecht.

The first attribution to Josquin of this chanson is in the Casanatense chansonnier of around 1480, which was probably put together to celebrate the betrothal of Isabella d'Este to Francesco Gonzaga. The chansonnier includes works by many of the great composers of the period, including Johannes Ockeghem, Johannes Martini and Alexander Agricola. It included six chansons attributed to Josquin, each with a different spelling of his name, suggesting that the copyist was not aware of Josquin prior to this, lessening the likelihood that the chanson was mistakenly attributed to Josquin.

An issue in the performance practice of Josquin's setting of this chanson is whether it was a vocal piece or an instrumental piece. Although there is underlay of the text in the Florence 2794 manuscript, the music does not fit well with the rondeau refrain of the original. At least ten other contemporary manuscripts include only the incipit and no other text.
