= 1571 in music =

== Events ==
- Giovanni Pierluigi da Palestrina becomes maestro di cappella at the Julian Chapel, St. Peter's, Rome
- Andrea Gabrieli writes the music for the festivities celebrating the victory of the Venetians over the Turks after the Battle of Lepanto.
- Orlande de Lassus visits France at the personal invitation of King Charles IX, who unsuccessfully attempts to employ him
- Tomás Luis de Victoria begins teaching at the Collegio Germanico in Rome
- Bálint Bakfark, Hungarian lutenist, moves to Padua, Italy

== Bands disbanded ==
- Weimar Court Chapel Choir

== Publications ==
- Elias Ammerbach – Orgel oder Instrument Tabulatur (Leipzig: Jacob Berwald Erben), the first printed German organ music in tablature
- Costanzo Antegnati – First book of madrigals for four voices with a dialogue for eight (Venice: Antonio Gardano)
- Giammateo Asola – Le Vergini, for three voices, book 1 (Venice: Antonio Gardano and sons), a book of madrigals
- Fabrice Caietain
  - Liber primus modulorum for four voices (Paris: Le Roy & Ballard), a collection of motets
  - Livre de chansons nouvelles for six voices (Paris: Le Roy & Ballard)
- Francesco Corteccia
  - First book of motets for six voices (Venice: the sons of Antonio Gardano)
  - First book of motets for five voices (Venice: the sons of Antonio Gardano)
- Giovanni Matteo Faà di Bruno – Second book of madrigals for five and six voices (Venice: the sons of Antonio Gardano)
- Giovanni Ferretti – Fourth book of canzoni alla napolitana for five voices (Venice: Girolamo Scotto)
- Andrea Gabrieli – First book of gregesche et justiniane for three voices (Venice: Antonio Gardano, figliuoli)
- Jacobus de Kerle – Selectae quaedam cantiones sacrae for five and six voices (Nuremberg: Theodor Gerlach)
- Orlande de Lassus
  - Modulis quinis vocibus numquam hactenus editi (Motets for five voices, never before published) (Paris: Le Roy & Ballard)
  - Livre de nouvelles chansons for four voices (Paris: Le Roy & Ballard)
- Luzzasco Luzzaschi – First book of madrigals for five voices (Ferrara: Francesco de' Rossi)
- Tiburtio Massaino – First book of madrigals for five voices (Venice: Antonio Gardano)
- Philippe de Monte – Fourth book of madrigals for five voices (Venice: Girolamo Scotto)
- Giovanni Battista Pinello di Ghirardi – Second book of canzoni napolitane for three voices (Venice: Girolamo Scotto)
- Costanzo Porta – First book of musica sex canenda vocibus (music for singing with six voices) (Venice: sons of Antonio Gardano), a collection of songs with sacred lyrics
- Alexander Utendal – Sacrae cantiones
- Gioseffo Zarlino – Dimonstrationi harmoniche, which establishes the primacy of the major mode

== Births ==
- January 15 (baptized) – Henry Ainsworth, author of the Ainsworth Psalter, the only book of music brought by the Pilgrim settlers to the Massachusetts Bay Colony in 1620. (d. 1622)
- February 15 (possibly) – Michael Praetorius, German organist, composer and music theorist (d. 1621)
- May 17 – William White, English composer (d. c. 1634).
- August 7 – Thomas Lupo, English composer of instrumental music (d. 1627)
- December 27 – Johannes Kepler, astronomer and writer on music (d. 1630)
- Dates unknown
  - Filipe de Magalhães, Portuguese composer (d. 1652).
  - Leon Modena, Italian rabbi, cantor, scholar and writer on music (d. 1648).
  - Martin Peerson (born ca. 1571 – ca. 1573; died 1650 or 1651), English composer, organist and virginalist
  - John Ward, English composer of madrigals (d. 1638).

== Deaths ==
- February 13 – Benvenuto Cellini, cornettist and recorder player, best known as a goldsmith and sculptor (b. 1500)
- March 20 – Giovanni Animuccia, composer (b. c. 1520)
- June 7 – Francesco Corteccia, Italian composer and organist (b. 1502)
- November 21 – Jan Blahoslav, Czech writer and composer (b. 1523)
- date unknown
  - Francisco de Ceballos, organist and composer
  - Bernardino de Ribera (Sahagún), Spanish composer (b. c.1499)
