= List of compositions by Alexander Agricola =

This is a list of works by the 15th century Flemish composer Alexander Agricola.

== Masses and mass sections ==
All are for 4 voices unless stated otherwise.

=== Masses ===
- Missa Le serviteur (based on Du Fay's chanson)
- Missa Malheur me bat (based on a chanson attributed to Malcourt, Martini and Ockeghem)
- Missa Je ne demande (based on Busnoys' chanson)
- Missa in Myne zyn (based on his on chanson and the monophonic tune)
- Missa Paschalis (based on the German chants for Kyrie I, Gloria I, Sanctus XVII and Agnus Dei XXII)
- Missa primi toni
- Missa secundi toni
- Missa sine nomine

=== Mass sections ===
- Credo Je ne vis oncques I (based on a chanson attributed to Du Fay and Binchois)
- Credo Je ne vis oncques II (based on a chanson attributed to Du Fay and Binchois)
- Credo Vilayge
- Credo—Sanctus Sine nomine (3vv)

== Motets ==
All are for 4 voices unless stated otherwise.

=== Hymns, Lamentations and Magnificats ===
- A solis ortus cardine
- Ave maris stella
- Lamentations (3vv)
- Lamentations
- Magnificat primi toni
- Magnificat secundi toni
- Magnificat octavi toni

=== Motets on other text ===
- Arce sedet Bacchus (2vv)
- Ave domina sancta Maria
- Ave pulcherrima regina
- Da pacem, (3vv)
- Ergo sancti martyres
- Nobis Sancte Spiritus
- O crux ave
- O quam glorifica (3vv)
- O virens virginum
- Regina coeli
- Salve regina I
- Salve regina II
- Si dedero, (3vv)
- Transit Anna timor

== Songs and other secular works ==
All are for 3 voices unless stated otherwise.

=== Motet-Chansons ===
- Belle sur toutes/Tota pulchra es
- L'heure est venue/Circumdederunt me
- Revenez tous regretz/Quis det ut veniat (4vv)

=== Vocal works ===
- Adieu m'amour
- Adieu m'amour
- A la mignonne de Fortune
- Allez mon cueur
- Allez, regretz
- Amor che sospirar
- Ay je rien fet
- C'est mal cherché
- C'est trop sur
- C'est ung bon bruit
- Crions nouel
- D ... (text lost)
- Dictes moy toutes
- Donne, noi siam dell'olio facitori (3vv?, fragmentary)
- En actendant
- En dispitant
- En m'en venant
- Et qui la dira
- Fortuna desperata (6vv)
- Gentil galans
- Guarde vostre visage
- Il me fauldra maudire
- Il n'est vivant
- In minen zin
- J'ay beau huer
- Je n'ay dueil (4vv)
- Je ne puis plus
- Je ne suis point
- Mauldicte soit
- Mijn alderliefste moeschkin
- Oublier veul
- Par ung jour de matinee
- Pour voz plaisirs
- Princesse de toute beaulté
- Royne des flours
- Se je fais bien
- Se je vous eslonge
- Se mieulx ne vient d'amours
- Serviteur soye
- Sei congé prens
- S'il vous plaist
- Si vous voullez
- Soit loing
- Sonnés muses melodieusement
- Va t'en, regret
- Vostre bouche dist
- Vostre hault bruit

=== Instrumental works ===
- Amours, amours
- Cecus non-judicat de coloribus
- Comme femme (4vv)
- Comme femme
- Comme femme (2vv)
- De tous biens plaine (4vv)
- De tous biens plaine
- De tous biens plaine
- De tous biens plaine
- De tous biens plaine
- D'ung aultre amer (4vv)
- D'ung aultre amer (4vv)
- D'ung aultre amer
- D'ung aultre amer
- [Duo], (2vv)
- Gaudeamus omnes (2vv)
- Jam fulsit (4vv)
- L'homme banni
- O Venus bant
- O Venus bant
- Pater meus agricola est
- Pourquoy tant/Pour quelque paine
- Tandernaken
- Tout a par moy (4vv)
- Tout a par moy
