= De tous biens plaine =

Song
- Published: 1501
- Composer(s): Hayne van Ghizeghem

"De tous biens plaine" is a French chanson, usually credited to Hayne van Ghizeghem, who wrote a 3-part version, published by Ottaviano Petrucci in 1501. Amongst other reworkings are a four-part version by Josquin and two 3-part versions by Alexander Agricola.

Full words and music are here

and of an Agricola version at the Choral Wiki here

A version of the first verse and its translation are given by David Munrow in The Art of the Netherlands as

De tous biens plaine est ma maistresse
Chascun lui doit tribut d'onneur;
Car assouvye est en valeur
Autant que jamais fut deesse.

My mistress possesses every virtue.
Everybody pays her homage,
for she is as full of worth
as ever any goddess was.

Loyset Compere used the tune as a basis for a mass setting, and the Credo survives of a setting by Josquin.

Some sources have claimed this to be the most famous chanson of the age .
