= Colinet de Lannoy =

French Renaissance composer

Colinet de Lannoy (died before 6 February 1497) was a French composer of the Renaissance. He was one of the composers/singers working at the Milan chapel at the time of the assassination of Duke Galeazzo Maria Sforza in 1476, and he possibly also worked in France.

== Life ==
Very little is known for certain about his life, and some details have been confused with other musicians named "Lannoy" or "Lanoy". Two other singers named Lannoy, Jehan and David, were known to be active at the French court in the middle of the 15th century, and may have been related; in addition, a "Karolus de Launoy", active at Bourges and later in France, was previously confused with him.

In 1477, Lannoy, along with Jean Japart, Johannes Martini, and Loyset Compère, was given a pass to leave Milan following the murder of Duke Galeazzo Maria Sforza. The singing group at the chapel had been one of the most distinguished in Europe, and the compositional style which developed there in the 1470s was widely influential: for example the motet-chanson was probably a Milanese invention. It is not known to what degree Lannoy was involved in the development of this style, nor is it known where Lannoy went after his dismissal. Most of the singers scattered, with Japart going to Ferrara, and Compère probably going back to France. Since one of Lannoy's known songs is in Dutch, he may have spent some time, either before or after Milan, in the Low Countries.

A line in Guillaume Crétin's elegy on the death of Johannes Ockeghem (6 February 1497) indicates that Lannoy had died by then.

== Music and influence ==
Only two compositions are definitely attributed to Lannoy, both secular songs: Cela sans plus and Adieu natuerlic leven mijn. The former of these was used as a basis for mass settings by other composers, including Johannes Martini and Jacob Obrecht.

One other piece has been considered as a possible composition by Lannoy, a partial cyclic mass for three voices. It is given to "lanoy" in the source, and the style is consistent both with Lannoy's songs and with that of other composers working at Milan.

== References and further reading ==
- Gustave Reese, Music in the Renaissance. New York, W.W. Norton & Co., 1954. ISBN 0-393-09530-4
- Fabrice Fitch: "Colinet de Lannoy", Grove Music Online, ed. L. Macy (Accessed June 30, 2007), (subscription access)
