= Nicolas Champion =

Franco-Flemish composer and singer

- Born: Liège
- Occupation(s): Franco-Flemish composer and singer of the Renaissance

Nicolas Champion (also Nicolas Liégeois, dis le Liégeois; c. 1475 – 20 September 1533) was a Franco-Flemish composer and singer of the Renaissance. He was a member of the renowned musical establishments of the Habsburg court, including the chapels of Philip I of Castile and Charles V. While with Philip's chapel he was a close associate of composers such as Pierre de La Rue, Marbrianus de Orto and Alexander Agricola.

== Life ==
Champion was born in or near Liège, where he probably received his early training. Little information survives regarding his early life and the first record relating to his involvement with Philip's Grande chapelle, the Habsburg chapel choir, dates from 13 November 1501, prior to Philip's first trip to Spain. He was one of the few singers who remained with the chapel after Philip's death in 1506, maintained by his wife Joanna the Mad; for several years after Philip's death, Joanna traveled around Castile with his corpse in its coffin, having her chapel choir sing requiems to it each night, until her father Ferdinand I finally had her locked up in the fortress at Tordesillas.

After the dissolution of Joanna's chapel, Champion joined the chapel of Charles V. While there, he had a high status and was highly paid (according to court records) though he was always at a lower level than Pierre de La Rue. There is evidence that Champion may also have been associated with the court of Frederick the Wise, Duke of Saxony, for which he wrote a five-voice mass.

== Music ==
While only six of his works survive with reliable attribution, the recent reevaluation of a four-voice setting of the De profundis (Psalm 130) (long attributed to Josquin des Prez) gives evidence of his quality as a composer.

Champion's surviving music includes two masses, both for five voices: Missa Maria Magdalena and Missa Ducis saxsonie: Sing ich niet wol; two psalm motets, one for four and one for six voices; and a secular song, Noch weet ick, in Dutch. The setting of De profundis, long attributed to Josquin, is relatively well-known: for example, Grout and Palisca's History of Western Music, often used in college music history courses, gives it as an example of Josquin's late style. The famous copyist Pierre Alamire attributed it to Champion in its earliest extant source, the manuscript VienNB Mus 15941, and the case has recently been made that the attribution should remain with Champion, for stylistic reasons.

Stylistically his music is similar to Josquin's in many respects, including its large-scale tonal organization, use of motifs and paraphrase, and motivic development. In addition he used florid, rhythmically active textures with many layers.
