= Antonius Divitis =

Flemish composer

Antonius Divitis (also Anthonius de Rycke, and Anthoine Le Riche – "the rich") (c. 1475 – c. 1530) was a Flemish composer of the Renaissance, of the generation slightly younger than Josquin des Prez. He was important in the development of the parody mass.

== Life ==
He was born in Leuven. He first appears in the historic record in 1501 in Bruges, at the church of St. Donatian, where he taught singing to the choirboys. Later in 1501 he became singing master, then he became succentor, and at the end of 1501 was ordained a priest. He took a similar musical post in Mechelen at the church of St. Rombout in 1504, but he had fallen into debt, and left his job in a hurry in 1505, evidently fleeing from bill collectors. In late 1505 he joined the singers in the chapel of Philip the Fair. Along with Pierre de la Rue, Alexander Agricola, and others in the chapel, he went to Spain in 1506 with Philip when he was summoned there to become king; although Philip died of typhoid later that year, the singers remained until 1508, maintained by Philip's insane widow, Joanna of Castile. The chapel was disbanded in 1508 and the singers scattered.

Divitis left Spain and returned to northern Europe. His next documented appointment was in 1510 when he was singing master for the chapel of Anne of Brittany; and when the singers were absorbed by the French court after her death in 1514, he went with them, and stayed in the French court chapel until at least 1525, when François I was decisively defeated and captured at the Battle of Pavia. Nothing certain is known of Divitis after this date. He may have gone to Rome, based on the similarity of his name to that of a man listed in the chapel choir in 1526. He is mentioned as being dead by 1534 by a manuscript copyist, but the implication in the reference is that he had been dead for several years.

== Music and influence ==
Surviving works by Divitis include masses, motets, Magnificat settings (a genre that was to become quite popular in the middle 16th century), and a chanson. The three masses by Divitis use parody technique, and are among the first to do so; he is cited as influential in development of the genre, along with Jean Mouton and the other members of the French royal chapel. Each of his masses is for four voices, although an isolated six-voice setting of the Credo survives attributed to him. One of them, Missa Gaude Barbara, is based on a motet of that name by Mouton, and may have been a tribute to his colleague.

Motets by Divitis are often for five and six voices, which was another relatively innovative feature in music around the beginning of the 16th century. They are contrapuntal in texture, and two of them (Ista est speciosa and Per lignum crucis) are entirely canonic. His setting of the Marian antiphon Salve regina uses an identical tenor line, rests and all, to that which appears in Josquin's setting of the popular song Adieu mes amours; it is uncertain whether Divitis consciously based his setting on Josquin, or on the popular song, which probably came first.
