= Gilles Reingot =

Franco-Flemish composer

Gilles Reingot (French: Gillequin de Bailleul; fl. 1501–1530) was a Franco-Flemish composer of the Renaissance, associated with the Habsburg court of Philip I of Castile. He was a close associate of composer Pierre de La Rue.

== Life ==
After first serving as a sommelier for Charles V, Holy Roman Emperor, then an infant, Reingot became part of the grande chapelle of Philip I. He first appears in the records of the Habsburg chapel singers in November 1501, in a master list of singers compiled prior to Philip's first trip to Spain. Reingot went on the trip, as part of the musical ensemble which was one of the most distinguished in Europe; they were in Spain for part of 1502, and singing again in France later that year.

Reingot went on Philip's second trip to Spain as well, the infamous trip which was to prove fatal to Philip, and fatal to the sanity of his wife, Joanna the Mad. In September 1506, when Philip died of a fever in Spain, many of the singers of the grande chapelle departed, mostly going back to France or the Netherlands, but Reingot was one of the ones who remained behind, along with Pierre de La Rue. For the next several years they took part in Juana's bizarre journey across Castile, each night singing a requiem to the disinterred corpse of Philip, which they brought along with them in its coffin, until Ferdinand II, Juana's father, had her locked up in the fortress at Tordesillas and had Philip more permanently buried.

By 1509, Reingot had returned north to the chapel of Charles, where he remained until around 1530. Nothing further is known of him after that year.

== Music ==
While Reingot's music may once have been more abundant, only two pieces survive attributed to him: a four-voice motet setting of the Marian antiphon Salve regina, and a four-voice chanson, Fors seulement, based on the tune by Johannes Ockeghem. Reingot's version, published in Petrucci's Canti C, uses Ockeghem's superius transposed down an octave in the tenor voice and has three florid, quick-moving contrapuntal voices around it.
