= Pierre de la Rue =

Franco-Flemish composer (c. 1452 – 1518)

Pierre de la Rue (c. 1452 – 20 November 1518) was a Franco-Flemish composer and singer of the Renaissance. His name also appears as Piersson or variants of Pierchon and his toponymic, when present, as various forms of de Platea, de Robore, or de Vico. A member of the same generation as Josquin des Prez, and a long associate of the Habsburg-Burgundian musical chapel, he ranks with Agricola, Brumel, Compère, Isaac, Obrecht, and Weerbeke as one of the most famous and influential composers in the Netherlands polyphonic style in the decades around 1500.

== Biography ==
=== Early life ===
La Rue was probably born at Tournai, in modern Belgium, and likely educated at the Notre-Dame Cathedral there, which had a substantial musical establishment. He may have been the son of Jean de la Rue, a master enlumineur of the city of Tournai.

While no records remain of his childhood, a Peter vander Straten (the Flemish equivalent of his name) is mentioned in the archives of the cathedral of Ste. Gudule in Brussels in 1469–1470, as an adult (tenor) singer; this is considered very likely to have been him. In 1471 he was in Ghent at the Jacobskerk as a part-time singer, paid from the cathedral's miscellaneous fund, suggesting he was brought in for special performances of polyphony. Subsequently, he was employed in Nieuwpoort in 1472, at the church of Onze-Lieve-Vrouw, probably initially as a temporary arrangement, but by the end of the year the church authorities hired him on a more permanent basis. He was no longer employed there by 1477/8 for his name had vanished from the account-book.

His whereabouts during the 1480s are not very well known, although there is a record that he worked at a place called "St Ode" (date and city not known), and also possibly at the cathedral at Cambrai. Previous biographies of La Rue place him in Siena, Italy, between 1483 and 1485; however, it has been determined that the "La Rue" in the records there was a different singer. Pierre de la Rue probably never went to Italy, making him one of the few prominent Franco-Flemish composers of this generation never to travel there.

In 1489 he was paid by the Confraternity of the Illustre Lieve Vrouwe in 's-Hertogenbosch, again as "Peter vander Straten", and the document indicates that he had come from Cologne, so he evidently had spent some time in Germany as a tenor singer. He remained at the Confraternity in 's-Hertogenbosch until 1492, at which time he simultaneously became a full member of the Confraternity, and joined the Grande chapelle of Holy Roman Emperor Maxmilian. He was to remain in the employ of the Habsburgs, and the Grande chapelle, for the rest of his life.

=== The Grande chapelle ===
The Grande chapelle, the musical establishment of the Burgundian-Habsburg court, already had a distinguished history by the time Philip the Handsome inherited it in 1494. This was the central institution of the Burgundian School, the venue in which composers such as Dufay and Busnois had worked and already left a body of music; music by Ockeghem had also recently been copied into manuscripts associated with the group immediately before La Rue's hire. In addition, music by the composers favored by the previous dukes of Burgundy such as Charles the Bold – Adrien Basin, Gilles Joye, Hayne van Ghizeghem, and Robert Morton – was also probably still being performed and studied. It was a formidable musical organization, equalling in quality the papal chapel in Rome itself, and its quality continued to improve into the 16th century, with the addition of composers such as Marbrianus de Orto, Nicolas Champion, Gilles Reingot, Antonius Divitis, and Alexander Agricola. This was the musical environment into which La Rue entered his full maturity as a composer.

Once La Rue was engaged with the Grande chapelle, he made two trips to Spain. On the second trip, in 1506, he was shipwrecked in the English Channel, and spent three months at the court of Henry VII of England. After two more years in Spain, in the service of Juana of Castile – Joanna the Mad – he returned to the Netherlands in 1508, probably because Juana had been forced out of power (her husband, Philip, had died of typhus in 1506). Juana was inconsolable, unable to leave the corpse of her dead husband, and had become quite insane; why La Rue stayed as long as he did is not known, but it is not impossible that his dark, intensely expressive music was one of the few things that brought her solace. In addition, he was treated well. Juana promoted him to premier chapelain, the head of the chapel, and paid him twice what the other singers received; paying the singers was apparently one of the only practical administrative matters she was able to do during the period of her madness.

On his travels with the Grande chapelle he met many of the other Franco-Flemish composers who were working at the same time (for instance, Josquin, Isaac and Robert de Févin) and these meetings may also have proved decisive in the development of his style.

=== Retirement and death ===
Between 1508 and 1514, the court stayed at Mechelen and Brussels, rarely traveling. These are hypothesized to be the most productive years for La Rue as a composer, since he would have had the most free time, and spared the rigors of travel across Europe. Shortly after Charles V came of age in 1515, the court resumed its travels; La Rue retired shortly after a huge tour of all the cities in the northern portions of Charles' empire. Likely he left his job during one of the chapel's visits to Kortrijk, in May or June 1516. He remained there until his death a little more than two years later. While his epitaph alludes to the possibility that he may have worked at the courts in France and Hungary at some time, no other corroborating evidence has been found; however there remain biographical gaps in the 1470s and 1480s: for example, the location of "St Ode" is not yet known.

La Rue was relatively wealthy when he died, especially for a singer who was not an aristocrat, and details of his will and the subsequent events surrounding its disposition survive in detail. Not only did his executors find chests of money in his lodgings, but he had considerable income from his prebends, which he distributed to many places, including relatives, charities, choirs, institutions; and he arranged for requiem masses to be sung every day for the month after his death, and a further 300 masses to be sung afterwards, in several different cathedrals. He asked to be buried on the left side of the altar in the church in Kortrijk, although the exact location can no longer be found, and the epitaph only survives in several partially contradictory copies. His epitaph indicates he was a thrifty, virtuous person, not "given to the crimes of Venus" (as, for example, composer Nicolas Gombert, who was sent to the galleys for molesting a choirboy, Ghiselin Danckerts, who was fired from the Sistine Chapel choir for being excessively "given to women", or Gilles Joye, who wrote a mass based on the name of his favorite prostitute). La Rue seems to have been appreciated and well liked by his colleagues throughout his career.

== Music ==
=== General character ===
La Rue wrote masses, motets, Magnificats, settings of the Lamentations, and chansons, a diverse range of compositions reflective of his status as the primary composer at one of Europe's most renowned musical institutions, surrounded by other similarly creative people. Some scholars have suggested that he composed music only during the last 20 years of his life, mainly when he was in the imperial service; but it has proven difficult to date any of his works precisely, although it has been possible to suggest groupings based on a rough chronology. Stylistically, his works are more similar to those of Josquin than to those of any other composer working at the same time. In fact, misattribution of doubtful works has gone both ways.

Yet there are some unique features of La Rue's style. He had a liking for extremely low notes in the bass voice, descending sometimes to the C below the bass staff or even the B flat; he employed more chromaticism than most of his contemporaries; and much of his work is rich in dissonance. He also broke up long, dense textures by inserting contrasting passages for two voices only, something done also by Ockeghem and Josquin. He was one of the first routinely to expand vocal forces from the standard four, to five or six. One of his masses for six voices, the Missa Ave sanctissima Maria, is a six-voice canon, a technically difficult feat reminiscent of some of the work of Ockeghem, and is the earliest six-voice mass known to exist.

Canonic writing is a particularly important feature of La Rue's style, for which he has been particularly celebrated. He liked to write canons of considerable complexity, rather than restrict himself to simple imitation. The second of his two masses based on the L'homme armé tune begins and ends with mensuration canons, in which all the voices sing the same material but at different tempi; this is yet another feat of contrapuntal virtuosity worthy of Josquin or Ockeghem; indeed La Rue sometimes seemed to be in conscious competition with the more renowned Josquin. The closing Agnus Dei of this mass is the only known mensuration canon of the entire era for four voices, with all four voices singing the same tune. La Rue wrote six pieces that are completely canonic from start to finish, including two masses, three motets and a chanson; he wrote three more masses, two motets, and three chansons which are based on canon but contain some free sections; numerous other works include canonic sections. In his use of canons, he may have been influenced by Matthaeus Pipelare, who wrote an early canonic mass La Rue almost certainly knew, since it was part of the repertory of the Habsburg court chapel.

=== Masses ===
La Rue was one of the first to use the parody technique thoroughly, permeating the texture of a mass with music drawn from all voices of a pre-existing source. Some of his masses use cantus firmus technique, but rarely strictly; he often preferred the paraphrase technique, in which the monophonic source material is embellished and migrates between voices.

La Rue wrote one of the earliest polyphonic Requiem Masses to survive, and it is one of his most famous works. Unlike later Requiems, it includes polyphonic settings of only the Introit, Kyrie, Tract, Offertory, Sanctus, Agnus, and Communion – the Dies Iræ, often the center of gravity in more recent Requiems, was a later addition. This was the normal liturgical practice in Gallican France and the region of northern Europe in which he worked. This mass, more than many others, emphasises the low registers of voices, and even the lowest voices themselves.

=== Motets and chansons ===
Twenty-five motets by La Rue survive, being mostly for four voices. While they use imitation, the technique is more likely to occur within sections and phrases rather than at their openings, unlike in the style of Josquin. Another stylistic feature characteristic of La Rue's motets is the use of ostinatos, which may be a single note, an interval, or a series of notes. In addition he uses germinal motifs – small easily recognizable patterns from which larger melodic units are derived, and which give unity to a composition. Overall the motets are complex contrapuntally, with the individual lines having a distinctive character, in the manner of Ockeghem. This is most true in the early works which were likely influenced by the older composer.

More than half of the motets are on the subject of the Virgin Mary. La Rue was the first composer to write a Magnificat on each of the eight tones, and additionally wrote six separate settings of the Marian antiphon Salve regina. Most likely these are early works.

=== Chansons ===
His thirty chansons show a diversity of style, some being akin to the late Burgundian style (for example, as seen in the works of Hayne van Ghizeghem or Gilles Binchois), and of others using a more current imitative polyphonic style. Since La Rue never spent time in Italy, he did not employ the Italian frottola style which featured light, homophonic textures (which Josquin used so effectively in his popular El Grillo and Scaramella), and which so charmed the other members of his generation.

== Works ==
=== Masses ===
- Missa Alleluia (5vv)
- Missa Almana (4vv)
- Missa Assumpta est Maria (4vv)
- Missa Ave Maria (4vv)
- Missa Ave sanctissima Maria (6vv)
- Missa Conceptio tua (5vv)
- Missa Cum iucunditate (or iocunditate) (4vv and 5vv)
- Missa de Beata Virgine (4vv)
- Missa de Feria (5vv)
- Missa de Sancta Anna (4vv)
- Missa de Santa Cruce (5vv)
- Missa de Sancto Antonio (4vv)
- Missa de Sancto Job (4vv)
- Missa de Septem Doloribus (5vv)
- Missa de Virginibus (4vv)
- Missa Incessament (5vv), also known as Missa Sic deus & Non salvatur rex, La Rue's longest mass setting
- Missa Inviolata (4vv)
- Missa Iste est Speciosa (5vv)
- Missa Jesum Liate (4vv)
- Missa L'homme armé I (4vv)
- Missa Nunqua fué pena major
- Missa O gloriosa Margaretha (4vv)
- Missa O salutaris hostia (4vv)
- Missa Pascale (5vv)
- Missa Pro fidelibus defunctis (4vv or 5vv)
- Missa Puer natus est (4vv)
- Missa Sancta Dei Genitrix (4vv)
- Missa Sine Nomine I (4vv)
- Missa Sub Tuum praesidium (4vv)
- Missa Tandernaken (4vv)
- Missa Tous les regretz (4vv)

=== Masses with uncertain attribution ===
- Missa Iste Confessor
- Missa L'homme armé II (4vv)
- Missa sine nomine II (4vv)

=== Mass fragments ===
- Kyrie in festo Paschale
- Kyrie Paschale
- Credo Angeli Archangeli
- Credo de villagiis
- Credo l'amour de moy
- Credo
- Credo

=== Motets ===
- Ave Regina cœlorum
- Ave sanctissima Maria
- Considera Israel
- Da pacem, Domine
- Delicta juventutis
- Gaude virgo mater
- Lauda anima mea Dominum
- Laudate Dominum omnes gentes
- O Domine Jesu Christi
- O salutaris hostia
- Pater de caelis Deus
- Quis dabit pacem
- Regina coeli
- Salve mater salvatoris
- Salve regina I
- Salve regina II
- Salve regina III
- Salve regina IV
- Salve regina V
- Salve regina VI
- Santa Maria virgo
- Si dormiero
- Te decet laus
- Vexilla Regis – Passio Domini

=== Motets with uncertain attribution ===
- Absalom, fili mi (originally attributed to Josquin; gradual scholarly consensus emerging that this may be by La Rue)
- Domini est terra
- Lamentationes Hieremiae (by Mahu)
- Virga tua

=== Magnificats ===
- 8 Magnificats, of which 7 survive: for four voices (tones II, IV, V, VII, and VIII), five voices (tone VI), and six voices (tone I)

=== Chansons ===
- À vous non-autre
- Au feu d'amour
- Autant en emporte
- Carmen in re
- Ce n'est pas jeu
- Cent mille regretz
- De l'œil de le fille
- Dedans bouton
- Dicte moy bergere
- D'ung altre aymer
- D'ung desplaisier
- En espoir vis
- En l'amour d'un dame
- Forseulement
- Forseulement
- Iam sauche
- Il fault morir
- Il viendra le jour
- Incessament mon povre cueur
- Las que plains tu
- Ma bouche rit
- Myn hert altyt heeft verlanghen
- Plorés, genicés, criés – Requiem
- Pour ceque je suis
- Pour ung jamais
- Pourquoy non
- Pourquoy tant me fault
- Si le changer
- Tant que nostre argent
- Tous les regretz
- Tous nobles cueurs
- Trop plus secret

=== Chansons with uncertain attribution ===
- Adieu comment
- Dueil et ennuy
- Je n'ay regretz
- Sailliés avant

== Recordings ==
- Pierre de La Rue: Portrait musical, Capilla Flamenca, Dirk Snellings (Musique en Wallonie, 2011, MEW 11059, 3 CDs). Includes four mass settings (Missa de septem doloribus, Missa Ave Maria, Missa Sub tuum praesidium and Missa Alleluia), motets and chansons.
- The Complete Magnificats and Three Salve Reginas of Pierre de la Rue, VivaVoce, Peter Schubert (Naxos 8.557896-97)
- Missa Incessament, ensemble amarcord, 2005 (Raum Klang "Edition Apollon" 10105
- Missa l'Homme Armé – "Missa pro defunctis" (Requiem), Ensemble Clément Janequin, Harmonia Mundi, 1989/1996, HMT 7901296
- "O Salutaris Hostia", Sacred Music of the Renaissance (Cantillation/Walker) ABC classics, 2003 (Australian Broadcasting Corporation 472 881-2)
- Missa Nuncqua fue pena mayor & Missa Inviolata, The Brabant Ensemble/Stephen Rice (Hyperion CDA 68150, 2016)
