= 1490s in music =

- 1490s in music
- 1500s
Other topics in 1490s:
- Art

Music timeline

This is a list of notable events in music that took place in the 1490s.

== Events ==
- 1490
  - January – Emperor Maximilian I writes a letter of recommendation for Jacobus Barbireau's visit to the Hungarian Court at Buda.
  - 24 October – Johannes Tinctoris petitions Pope Innocent VIII for the title and privileges of doctor of canon and civil law.
- 1491 – After an extended legal disputation, the singer and composer Francisco de la Torre receives a half-prebendary at the Seville Cathedral.
- 1498 – The Wiener Hofmusikkapelle, a forerunner of the Vienna Boys' Choir, is founded by Maximilian I, Holy Roman Emperor.

== Works ==
- 1497 – Josquin des Prez – Nymphes des bois

== Births ==
- 1490
  - 6 March – Fridolin Sicher, Swiss composer and organist (died 1546)
  - 12 October – Bernardo Pisano, Italian composer, singer, and classical scholar (died 1548)
  - Approximate date – John Taverner, English composer and organist (died 1545)
- 1496 – Johann Walter, German composer (died 1570)
- 1499 – Bernardino de Sahagún, Spanish composer (died 1571)

== Deaths ==
- November 6, 1492 – Antoine Busnois, composer and poet of the Burgundian School (b. c. 1430).
- January 28, 1495 – Juan de Triana, Spanish singer and composer
- February 6, 1497 – Johannes Ockeghem, composer of the Franco-Flemish School (b. c. 1410).
