= Gregoire (composer) =

French composer (fl. c.1500–1505)

Gregoire (flourished c.1500-1504) was a French composer.

== Scholarship on Gregoire ==
Gregoire is known only through his publications by the music publisher Ottaviano Petrucci. While biographical content about Gregoire is not known, scholars are fairly certain he was French both because of his name and the style of the music he composed. His motet Ave verum corpus/Ecce panis angelorum/Bone pastor/O salutaris hostia was published in Motetti B (1503). The work combines the well known Eucharistic chant "Ave verum corpus" with three chants associated with the Feast of Corpus Christi that are found in the Lauda Sion Salvatorem and Verbum supernum prodiens. Gregoire weaves these chants together into a polyphonic choral texture; making them work together through transposition and paraphrase.

Gregoire composed only one other known work, the four-part choral chanson "Et raira plus la lune" which was published in Petrucci's Canti C. This work is written in the French manner of the Renaissance in a vein similar to that of composers Ninot le Petit and Antoine Bruhier.
