= Motet-chanson =

The motet-chanson was a specialized musical form of the Renaissance, developed in Milan during the 1470s and 1480s, which combined aspects of the contemporary motet and chanson.

Many consisted of three voice parts, with the lowest voice, a tenor or a contra, singing a sacred text in Latin, drawn from chant, while the two upper voices sang a secular text in French. Some were written for four to five voices, with the bassus taking the Latin part. Generally, the French text was either a commentary on the Latin text or had some symbolic relation to it. The lowest voice served as a cantus firmus, and usually sang in long notes, with phrases separated by long rests, while the upper voices, singing more quickly, followed the rigid formal structure of the contemporary formes fixes, particularly the rondeau and the bergerette.

The three most prominent composers of motet-chansons were Josquin des Prez, Loyset Compère, and Alexander Agricola, all of whom were in Milan, Italy, during the late 15th century as part of the progressive and opulent musical establishment of the Sforza family. Other composers who wrote motet-chansons included Johannes Prioris and Johannes Martini. Of these, only Prioris is not known to have been in Milan, but then relatively little is known about his life.

Josquin wrote three motet-chansons: "Que vous madame/In pace", "A la mort/Monstra te esse matrem", and "Fortune destrange plummaige/Pauper sum ego". "Que vous madame" had circulated widely by 1490; it was one of the earliest of Josquin's compositions to do so. Two of Agricola's motet-chansons, "L'eure est venue/Circundederunt" and "Revenez tous regretz/Quis det ut veniat", are preserved in manuscripts of the chanson albums of Margaret of Austria, Duchess of Savoy, as are two of Compère's, "Plaine d'ennuy/Anima mea" and "O devotz cocurs/O vos omnes".

It has been inferred that the motet-chanson repertory may once have been much larger than is now known, since many of the surviving sources give only the Latin text for three-voice compositions of otherwise similar texture. It may be that the uppermost voices for some of these once had secular French words, now lost.

== References and further reading ==
- Richard Sherr, ed., The Josquin Companion. Oxford, Oxford Univ. Press, 2000. ISBN 0-19-816335-5
- Gustave Reese, Music in the Renaissance. New York, W.W. Norton & Co., 1954. ISBN 0-393-09530-4
- Gustave Reese (biography) and Jeremy Noble (works), "Josquin Desprez," Howard Mayer Brown, "Chanson", in The New Grove Dictionary of Music and Musicians, ed. Stanley Sadie. 20 vol. London, Macmillan Publishers Ltd., 1980. ISBN 1-56159-174-2
