= 15th century in philosophy =

This is a list of philosophy-related events in the 15th century.

== Events ==
- 1433 – Baverius de Bonittis starts teaching philosophy and logic at the University of Bologna
- 1433 – Ambrogio Traversari completed his translation of Lives and Opinions of Eminent Philosophers

== Publications ==
- 1433 – Lorenzo Valla publishes his much modified second edition of De voluptate (On Pleasure) while on sojourn in Pavia
- 1499 – Niccolò Machiavelli, Discorso sopra le cose di Pisa
- 1500 – Desiderius Erasmus, Collectanea Adagiorum

== Births ==
- 1433 – Marsilio Ficino (d. 1499). Christian Neoplatonist, head of Florentine Academy and major Renaissance Humanist figure. First translator of Plato's complete extant works into Latin.
- 1433 – Nil Sorsky (d. 1508), Russian Hesychast
- c.1467 – Desiderius Erasmus (d. 1536).
- 1467 – John Major (or Mair) (d. 1550). Scottish logician

== Deaths ==
- 1432 or 1433 – Ibn Turkah (Sa'in al-Din Turkah Isfahani), an influential Turcoman scholar and Sufist philosopher at the School of Isfahan, exiled by Tamerlane until the latter's death. The date of Ibn Turkah's death is uncertain; either 1432 or 1433.
- 1499 – Marsilio Ficino (b. 1433). See § Births

== See also ==
- List of centuries in philosophy

== Bibliography ==
- Kristeller, Paul Oskar, Studies in Renaissance Thought and Letters, Volume 3, Edizioni di Storia e Letteratura, 1993 ISBN 8884983339.
- Laos, Nicolas, The Metaphysics of World Order, Pickwick Publications, 2015 ISBN 9781498201018.
- Lepage, John L., The Revival of Antique Philosophy in the Renaissance, Palgrave Macmillan, 2012 ISBN 1137281812.
- Lorch, Maristella de Panizza, "Voluptas, molle quoddem et non invidiosum nomen: Lorenzo Valla's defense of Voluptas in the preface to his De voluptate", pp. 214–228 in, Mahoney, Edward Patrick (ed), Philosophy and Humanism, Leiden: E. J. Brill, 1976 ISBN 9004043780.
- Nasr, Seyyed Hossein, Islamic Philosophy from Its Origin to the Present, State University of New York Press ISBN 0791481557.
- Schmitt, Charles B., "John Wolley (ca. 1530–1596) and the first Latin translations of Sextus Empiricus", pp. 61–70 in, Watson, Richard A. (ed); Force, James E. (ed), The Sceptical Mode in Modern Philosophy, Springer, 2012 ISBN 9400927444.
