= Vincenzo Capirola =

Italian composer, lutenist and nobleman

Vincenzo Capirola (1474 – after 1548) was an Italian composer, lutenist and nobleman of the Renaissance. His music is preserved in an illuminated manuscript called the Capirola Lutebook, which is considered to be one of the most important sources of lute music of the early 16th century.

== Life and music ==
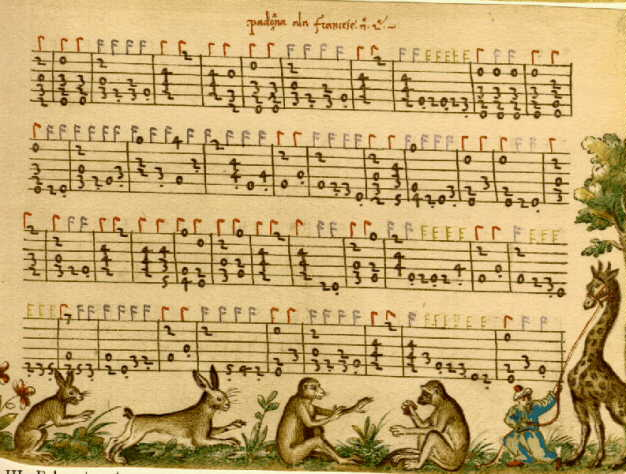
A page from the Capirola Lutebook

He was probably from Brescia, and is known to have lived in that city for several periods of his life, although he was in Venice in 1517 and for some time after that, the period during which the illuminated manuscript was prepared. It is possible that Capirola is the famous Brescian lutenist who visited the court of Henry VIII of England, although his name was not recorded (no other virtuoso lutenists of the period, from Brescia, who were also noblemen, are known).

The Lutebook contains the earliest known examples of legato and non-legato indications, as well as the earliest known dynamic indications. The pieces vary from simple studies suitable for beginners on the instrument, to immensely demanding virtuoso pieces. There are also 13 ricercars in the book, which alternate passages in brilliant toccata style with passages in three-part counterpoint similar to that of the vocal music of contemporary composers such as Jacob Obrecht.

In addition to music by Capirola (and others — Capirola evidently transcribed several pieces by other composers for the book), the Lutebook contains a preface which is one of the most important primary sources on early 16th century lute-playing. It includes information on how to play legato and tenuto, and how to perform ornaments of various types, how to choose the best fingering for passagework. It also includes very practical details such as how to string and tune the instrument.

== Notes ==
1. Reese, p. 521.

== References and further reading ==
- Gustave Reese, Music in the Renaissance. New York, W.W. Norton & Co., 1954. ISBN 0-393-09530-4
- Arthur J. Ness: "Vincenzo Capirola", Grove Music Online ed. L. Macy (Accessed October 27, 2005), (subscription access)
- O. Gombosi, Compositione di Meser Vincenzo Capirola: Lute-book (circa 1517). Neuilly-sur-Seine, 1955.
