= Giovanni Maria Alemanni =

Italian composer and lutentist

Giovanni Maria Alemanni (also Joannis Marie, Gian Maria, etc.) (fl. 1st quarter of the 16th century) was an Italian composer and lutenist. Practically nothing is known about his life or work. The only known collection of his music, published in 1508 by Ottaviano Petrucci, is lost. He was still active in 1521, and apparently was one of the last exponents of the plectrum technique (Wilson, 1997, citing Franco Pavan). Alemanni's reputation was probably quite high: in 1536 the printer Francesco Marcolini praised him as one of the best composers of his time, along with Giovanni Angelo Testagrossa and Josquin des Prez (Ness, Grove).
