= Harmonice Musices Odhecaton =

1501 anthology of songs by Ottaviano Petrucci

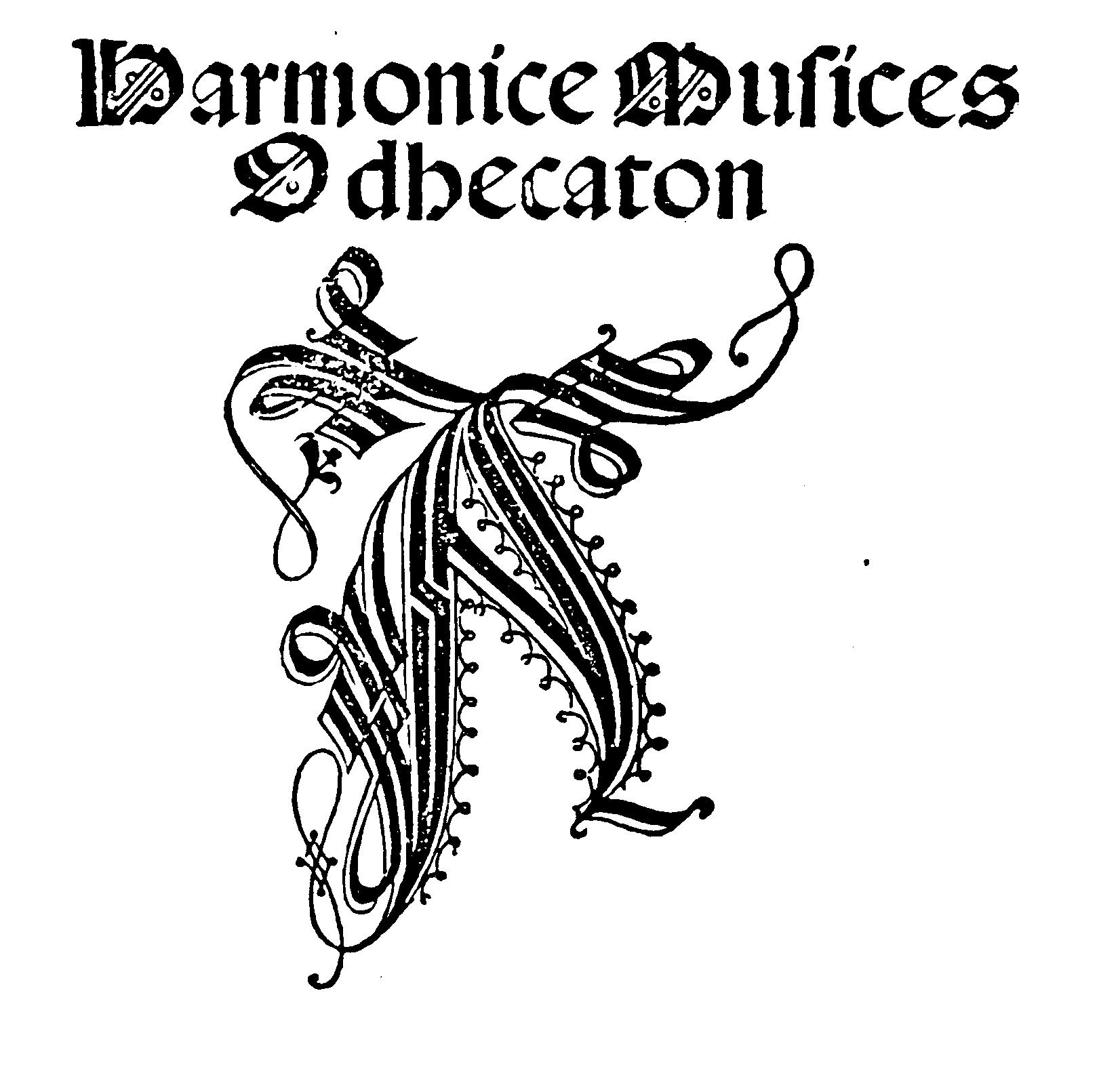
Frontispiece to the Odhecaton.

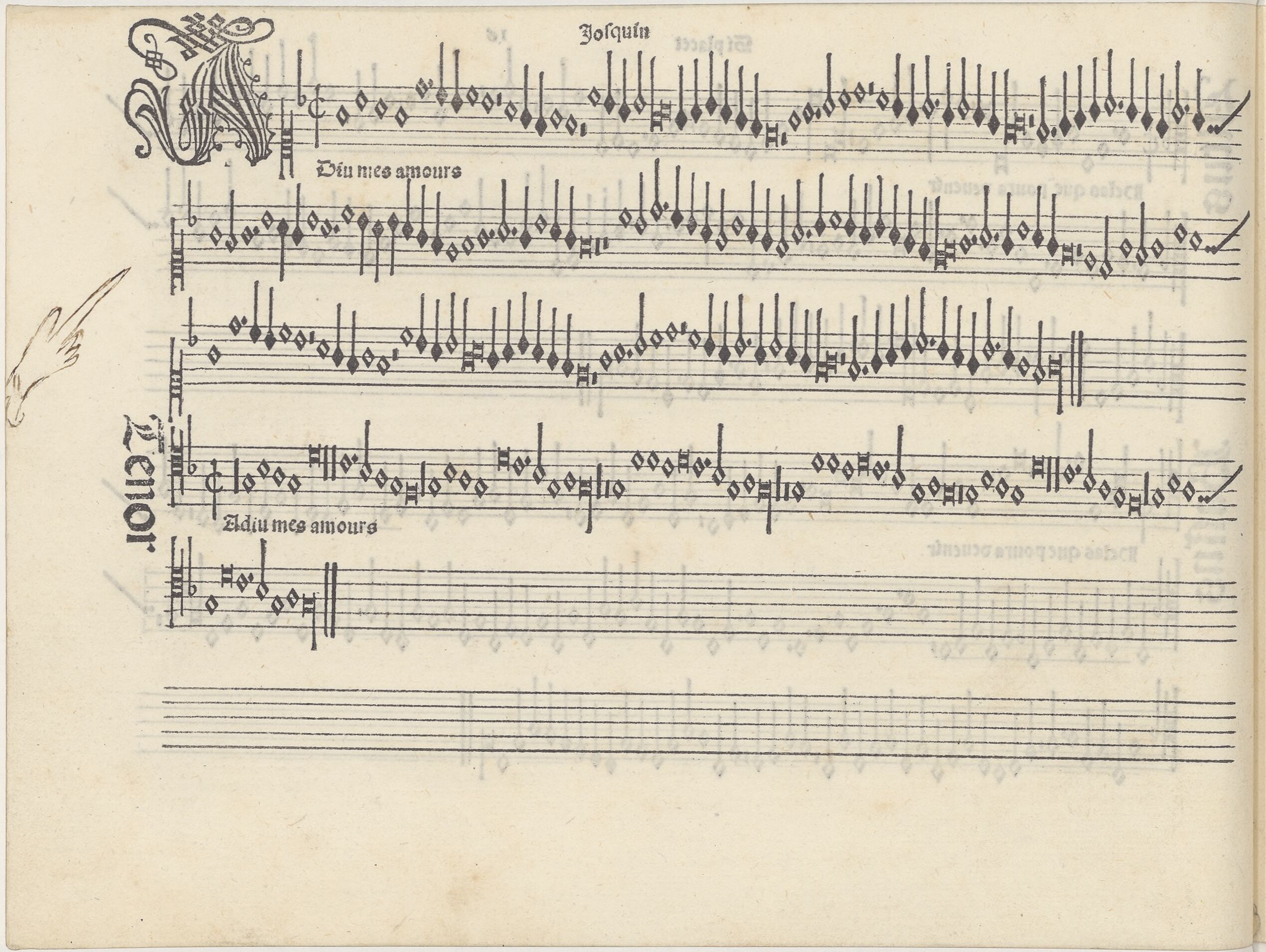
Adieu mes amours by Josquin des Prez in the Odhecaton.

The Harmonice Musices Odhecaton ("One Hundred Songs of Harmonic Music", also known simply as the Odhecaton) is an anthology of polyphonic secular songs published by Ottaviano Petrucci in 1501 in Venice. It is the first book of polyphonic music ever to be printed using movable type. (Printing plainchant with movable type had been possible since the 1470s.) The Odhecaton was hugely influential both in publishing in general and in dissemination of the Franco-Flemish musical style.

== Background ==
Seeing the business potential for music printing, in 1498 Petrucci had obtained an exclusive 20-year license for all printing activities related to music anywhere in the Venetian Republic. Three years later, in 1501, he brought out his first anthology, 96 secular songs, mostly polyphonic French chansons, for three or four voice parts, calling it the Harmonice musices odhecaton. For this work he printed two parts on the right-hand side of a page, and two parts on the left, so that four singers or instrumentalists could read from the same sheet. The type was probably designed, cut, and cast by Francesco Griffo and Jacomo Ungaro, both of whom were in Venice at the time. The collection included music by some of the most famous composers of the time, including Johannes Ockeghem, Josquin des Prez, Antoine Brumel, Antoine Busnois, Alexander Agricola, Jacob Obrecht, Hayne van Ghizeghem. Many of the works contained in it (as is often the case in manuscripts and early printed collections) are anonymous.

The book was edited by Petrus Castellanus, a Dominican friar who was maestro di cappella of San Giovanni e Paolo. Inclusion of composers in this famous collection did much to enhance their notability, since the prints, and the technology, were to spread around Europe in the coming decades.

The Odhecaton used the triple-impression technique, in which first the musical staff was printed, then the text, and then the notes. Most of the 96 pieces, although they were written as songs, were not provided with the text, implying that instrumental performance was intended for many of them. Texts for most can be found in other manuscript sources or later publications.

The first edition of the Odhecaton (Harmonice Musices Odhecaton A) does not survive complete, and the exact publication date is not known, but it includes a dedication dated May 15, 1501. The second and third editions were printed on January 14, 1503 and May 25, 1504, respectively. Each corrected several errors of the previous editions. Petrucci published two further anthologies, the Canti B and Canti C, in 1502 and 1504, respectively.

Petrucci's publication not only revolutionized music distribution: it contributed to making the Franco-Flemish style the international musical language of Europe for the next century, since even though Petrucci was working in Italy, he chiefly chose the music of Franco-Flemish composers for inclusion in the Odhecaton, as well as in his next several publications. A few years later he published several books of native Italian frottole, a popular song style which was the predecessor to the madrigal, but the inclusion of Franco-Flemish composers in his many publications was decisive on the diffusion of the musical language.
