= Discourse on Pisa =

1499 history of Pisa by Niccolò Machiavelli

Discourse on Pisa (Italian: Discorso sopra le cose di Pisa) is a 1499 work by Italian Renaissance historian and political scientist Niccolò Machiavelli about the history of Pisa.
