= Simon Moreau =

Simon Moreau (fl. 1553–1558) was a composer of the Franco-Flemish School. He published compositions including settings of Vous Seulement and Sancta et immaculata, 1553.
