= William White (composer) =

English composer of the Tudor period

William White (1571 – c. 1634?) was a composer of classical music of the Tudor period, who worked in England.

According to Ernst Hermann Meyer, "White is chiefly known from three fantasias a 5, and seven a 6; chiefly in Oxford, Christ Church MS. 2. Little is known of his career." His consort music appears in Reverend Thomas Myriell's score compilations, though not in the more famous Tregian's.

In certain fantasias of White (singled out by Meyer), as with some by Thomas Lupo the elder and Alfonso Ferrabosco the younger, soloistic elements - the juxtaposition of sections where the parts are treated equally, with sections where one instrument has a part of more virtuosic or melodic interest than the others - anticipate the concerto grosso to come.
