= Jean Japart =

Franco-Flemish composer

Jean Japart (fl. c. 1474 – 1481) was a Franco-Flemish composer of the Renaissance, active in Italy. He was a popular composer of chansons, and may have been a friend of Josquin des Prez.

== Life and work ==
Nothing is known about his life except for a brief period during the late 1470s, although it is probable he was born in Picardy. He was one of the members of the famous Sforza chapel choir in Milan between 1474 and 1476, which included Alexander Agricola, Loyset Compère and Johannes Martini, the time when this institution had one of the most famous groups of singers and composers in Europe. After the assassination of Galeazzo Sforza in 1476, he left Milan, as did most of the musicians; Japart went to Ferrara where he was quickly employed by Ercole I d'Este; not only did he become one of the most highly paid singers at the Ferrarese court, but the Duke gave him a house in Ferrara. By 1481 he was gone, and there is no further record of him.

Japart was the composer of 23 chansons which are extant. A lost composition by Josquin, Revenu d'oultrements, Japart is often cited as evidence of a friendship between the two composers; if so, they probably met in Milan after 1481, since Josquin did not go to Italy until around 1484.

Stylistically, Japart's music is influenced by Busnois, one of the earlier group of Burgundian composers. He was fond of the quodlibet, the combination of several pre-existing tunes in ingenious ways, and he also wrote puzzle canons — compositions which the singers were intended to figure out from clues given in the text. For example, one of his chansons can only be performed correctly by transposing one of the parts down a twelfth and singing it in retrograde motion. (When a puzzle canon is solved correctly, the parts fit together without violation of the prevailing rules of counterpoint, which in the 15th century are described in the works of theorists such as Tinctoris.)

Japart's music was evidently popular, since many of his chansons were reprinted by Petrucci and achieved wide distribution.

== References and further reading ==
- Atlas, Allan W. (1980). "Japart, Jean". In Sadie, Stanley (ed.). The New Grove Dictionary of Music and Musicians. Vol. ix (1st ed.). London: Macmillan. p. 553.
- ____ and Jane Alden. "Japart, Jean", Grove Music Online, ed. L. Macy (accessed January 10, 2005), grovemusic.com (subscription access).
