= Johannes Ghiselin =

Flemish composer

Johannes Ghiselin (Verbonnet) (fl. 1455–1511) was a Flemish composer of the Renaissance, active in France, Italy and in the Low Countries. He was a contemporary of Josquin des Prez, and a significant composer of masses, motets, and secular music. His reputation was considerable, as shown by music printer Ottaviano Petrucci's decision to print a complete book of his masses immediately after his similar publication of masses by Josquin – only the second such publication in music history.

== Life ==
Little is known about his early life, but it can be inferred that he was from the south Netherlands, from archival mentions of him as being "da Piccardia" and "fiamengo". He may have been associated with the Burgundian chapel in the 1470s during the time of Charles the Bold, since he composed Je lay empris for him; however, no documentary record of his having been there has yet been found.

The first direct record of Ghiselin is in 1491, when he was in Ferrara. Isabella d'Este sent him to France to get some singers for the Este chapel that same year. In 1492 and 1493 he was a singer in Florence, and it is possible that he went to France and/or the Low Countries immediately after that. Since he is listed in Jean Crétin's poem (1497) on the death of Ockeghem along with other students of that famous composer, it has been inferred that he may have studied with Ockeghem, although if so, it is not known if this occurred before coming to Italy or during the mid-1490s.

Ghiselin maintained a connection both with the French court and Ferrara, occasionally serving as an emissary. After Josquin accepted the offer of employment in Ferrara in 1503, Ghiselin traveled with him from Paris to Ferrara, arriving on April 12 "in a splendid carriage". Ghiselin apparently remained in Ferrara until 1505, when both he and Josquin fled the outbreak of the plague there; Jacob Obrecht, who had recently joined the spectacular musical establishment at the Estense court, remained behind, and succumbed to the contagion in July 1505.

Ghiselin evidently returned to the Low Countries after fleeing Ferrara, for he was in Bergen op Zoom in 1507, receiving a considerable stipend at the Onze Lieve Vrouwe Gilde. He probably died between then and 1511, since the records for those years are missing, and when the records resume his name is absent, and there are no further records of his activity.

== Music and influence ==
As with Josquin, Ghiselin was interested in solutions to the musical problems posed by the multiple-movement setting of the mass. Ghiselin's masses were well-known and respected, as is made clear by Petrucci choosing to publish an entire book of them, only the second book he published devoted to masses by a single composer (1503). Most of his masses are based on chansons, including works by Antoine Busnois, Alexander Agricola, Guillaume Dufay, Loyset Compère, and himself.

Ghiselin also wrote motets, chansons, secular songs in Dutch, as well as some instrumental music. His setting of "La Spagna" for four parts is probably one of the earliest settings of this famous bassadanza tune for multiple parts, although its date has not been determined.

== References and further reading ==
- Richard Sherr, ed., The Josquin Companion. Oxford, Oxford Univ. Press, 2000. ISBN 0-19-816335-5
- Gustave Reese, Music in the Renaissance. New York, W.W. Norton & Co., 1954. ISBN 0-393-09530-4
- Clytus Gottwold: "Johannes Ghiselin", Grove Music Online, ed. L. Macy (Accessed November 28, 2006), (subscription access)

== Recording ==
- Salve Mater Salve Jesu, Chant and Polyphony From Bohemia Around 1500, Capilla Flamenca together with Schola Gregoriana Pragensis and Barbara Maria Willi, 2007 (KTC 1346). Contains a recording of O gloriosa Domina, a motet by Johannes Ghiselin.
