= Johannes Prioris =

Netherlandish Renaissance composer

Johannes Prioris (c. 1460 – c. 1514) was a Netherlandish composer of the Renaissance. He was one of the first composers to write a polyphonic setting of the Requiem Mass.

On the basis of documents surrounding Saint-Sauveur in Blois, Theodor Dumitrescu has argued that Prioris is to be identified with the composer "Denis Prieur," making his Latin name "Dionysius Prioris." The name "Johannes" is attested in a single source.

He may have been born in Brabant. Very little is known about his life, except what can be inferred by the distribution of his manuscripts, and from his musical style. There is some evidence that he spent time in Rome as a singer at St. Peter's, since a similar name to his appears in the account ledgers, and his music appears in seven separate manuscript sources in the Vatican archives. Some time after 1500 he probably moved to France, since he is twice called the maître de chapelle to King Louis XII; once in a letter from Ferrara, and once by Jean d'Auton. He probably died before King Louis XII (1515) since there was a new maître de chapelle for the king's funeral ceremonies.

Prioris wrote six masses, of which five are still extant, including a famous Requiem, which he may have written for the funeral of Anne of Brittany, who died in 1514. He also wrote settings of the Magnificat, motets, chansons, and some examples of an early 16th-century genre which blended the last two: the motet-chanson. Most of his chansons look back to the style of Antoine Busnois and Hayne van Ghizeghem, while his motet writing, and especially his mass writing, shows elements of Italian influence, such as a chordal rather than a densely contrapuntal style.

== References and further reading ==
- Dumitrescu, Theodor. "Who Was “Prioris”? A Royal Composer Recovered." Journal of the American Musicological Society 65 (1), 2012
- Wexler, Richard (1980). "Prioris, Johannes". In Sadie, Stanley (ed.). The New Grove Dictionary of Music and Musicians. Vol. xv (1st ed.). London: Macmillan. pp. 275–276.
- Gustave Reese, Music in the Renaissance. New York, W.W. Norton & Co., 1954. ISBN 0-393-09530-4

Specific
