= Franciscus Bossinensis =

Franciscus Bossinensis (fl. 1509 – 1511) (Francis the Bosnian) was a lutenist-composer active in Italy in the 16th century. He lived and worked in Venice. He published two collections 'Tenori e contrabassi intabulati col sopran in canto figurato per cantar e sonar col lauto', containing 126 frottolas for voice and lute and 46 ricercares, printed by the Venetian printing house of Ottaviano Petrucci.
