= Gaspar van Weerbeke =

Netherlandish composer (c. 1445–1516)

Gaspar van Weerbeke (c. 1445 – after 1516) was a Netherlandish composer of the Renaissance. He was of the same generation as Josquin des Prez, but unique in his blending of the contemporary Italian style with the older Burgundian style of Du Fay.

== Life ==
He was born somewhere in the diocese of Tournai, evidently out of wedlock, and was educated at Oudenaarde. While little is known of the first two decades of his life, he probably knew or studied with Johannes Regis, and he may have studied with Johannes Ockeghem; in addition it is likely he knew Dufay at the Burgundian court of Charles the Bold, since so much of his music follows the model of the older composer. In 1471 he went to Milan, where he joined the singers of the Sforza chapel, which included Johannes Martini, Alexander Agricola, and Loyset Compère.

In 1472 and 1473 he went back north to Burgundy to find more singers for his Italian employer. Successful in his quest, he returned to Milan, and soon the Sforza chapel had one of the largest choirs in Europe. After the murder of Duke Sforza in 1476, however, the singers mostly disbanded. Weerbeke then joined the papal choir in Rome under Sixtus IV and Innocent VIII, where he remained until 1489, at which time he returned to Milan.

For the next decade Weerbeke seems to have been associated with several courts, including Milan, the court of Philip the Fair, and possibly the Medici in Florence. After 1500 he was again in Rome singing in the papal choir. The last years of his life are obscure; he may have returned to the region of his birth, for he received appointments for posts at both Cambrai and Tournai; and in addition there is a record of his possibly holding a post at St. Maria ad Gradus in Mainz in 1517.

== Music ==
Weerbeke combined the styles of the Italians with some of the older techniques of the Burgundians. He was almost alone among the Franco-Flemish composers in avoiding the smooth, imitative polyphonic style which was developing at the time, best exemplified by the music of Josquin des Prez.

He composed sacred music: masses, motets, motet cycles, a Magnificat setting, and a setting of the Lamentations, as well as a few secular chansons; but the bulk of his work is sacred vocal music. Attribution of the chansons is controversial, and many scholars believe them to have been composed by composers such as Josquin, or Jean Japart.

In style, much of his motet writing is homophonic, incorporating some of the lightness of the contemporary Italian secular music. Most of his masses are based on chanson melodies, which are stated clearly in the tenor voice, and the other voices usually move in a simple, occasionally parallel manner, related to the manner of Dufay or the other Burgundians. Once in a while Weerbeke uses imitation but never in the paired manner of Josquin or the pervasive manner of the later Franco-Flemish composers; his style of composition of masses is almost archaic in comparison to his contemporaries.

His music was much esteemed, especially in Italy, where it represented perhaps the popular aesthetic as opposed to the contrapuntal, but foreign grandeur of most of the composers from the Low Countries.

== Recordings ==
- 2003: Canticum Canticorum. In Praise of Love: The Song of Songs in the Renaissance, Capilla Flamenca. Eufoda 1359. Contains recordings of Tota pulchra es and Anima mea liquefacta est by Gaspar van Weerbeke.

== Sources ==
- Lindmayr-Brandl, Andrea; Kolb, Paul, eds. (2019). Gaspar van Weerbeke: New Perspectives on his Life and Music. Epitome musical. Turnhout, Belgium: Brepols. doi:10.1484/M.EM-EB.5.117281. ISBN 978-2-5035-8454-6.
- Article "Gaspar van Weerbeke", in The New Grove Dictionary of Music and Musicians, ed. Stanley Sadie. 20 vol. London, Macmillan Publishers Ltd., 1980. ISBN 1-56159-174-2
- Croll, Gerhard; Lindmayr-Brandl, Andrea. L. Macy (ed.). Gaspar van Weerbeke. Grove Music Online. (subscription required)
- Eric F. Fiedler, Die Messen des Gaspar van Weerbeke, Tutzing, 1997 ISBN 3-7952-0888-2
- Reese, Gustave (1954). Music in the Renaissance. New York: W. W. Norton & Company. OCLC 599427.
