= Hayne van Ghizeghem =

Franco-Flemish composer

Hayne van Ghizeghem (c. 1445 – from 1472 to 1497) was a Franco-Flemish composer of the early Renaissance Burgundian School.

While many of his works have survived, little is known about his life. He was probably born in Gijzegem (near Aalst, in modern Belgium). His musical talent must have been noticed early by Charles, Count of Charolais (later to become Charles the Bold) because there is a record of his being personally assigned to a teacher by him; in 1467 he is shown in the Burgundian employment records as being a singer. In addition, he was named along with Adrien Basin and Antoine Busnois as "chantre et valet de chambre" to Charles, indicating the special regard in which he was held.

Additionally, Hayne’s composing style was constantly evolving. While some of his earlier works were written in a monophonic style, he gradually developed a more polyphonic manner of writing, serving as a key transitional figure in the development of more complex Renaissance music. There, he broke the usual mold in all parts -- one that took liberties with text and used longer melodic lines that were not chopped with cadential formulas. His cadence included two independent and simultaneously sounding leading tones, and he used dissonance to create tension. He also frequently used contrary motion and enlarged the distance between the intervals. He had a simplistic yet flexible melodic grace about his work, which captivated the attention of many others during the time period. Towards the end of the century, he was admired by both listeners and colleagues for his stylistic cantus firmus, where a melodic subject would appear in different voices while also simultaneously woven in with other countermelodies. Examples of his cantus firmus appear in some of his best known chansons.

In addition to serving as a singer and composer, he evidently served as a soldier as well, for there is a record of purchase of military equipment for him, prior to the campaign against Liège by Charles. Charles took his musicians along with him on his campaigns, because he loved music as much as war, and insisted on entertainment; however Hayne was the only one of his famous musicians known to be also outfitted as a soldier. He is known to have been at the Siege of Beauvais in 1472, where Charles was decisively repulsed by the French, and Hayne was long presumed by scholars to have been killed in that battle. However, recent research into his surviving compositions indicates that some may have been produced after 1472, especially because they seem to show stylistic development beyond the ones that can be definitively dated to 1472 or before. Current scholarship suggests instead he may have survived the siege, and gone to work at the court of France. That such a distinguished singer and composer worked for France's bitter rival would have been an offense easy to forgive, for Burgundian musicians of the time were highly prized.

Hayne is principally known as a composer of chansons, and most of these are rondeaux. Two in particular—Allez regrets, and De tous biens plaine—were so famous in late 15th-century Europe that they appeared in 25 separate sources, many dating from before the invention of printing, and they were used as source material for many later compositions by other composers. Almost all of his works are for three voices; they are simple and clear in texture, in the typical manner of the Burgundian school; and the melodic voice is the highest.

Eleven pieces can be definitively attributed to Hayne, though numerous similar works classified as "anonymous" may actually be compositions of his. The entire collection has been edited and published in Corpus mensurabilis musicae, vol. lxxiv (1977), by B. Hudson.

== References and further reading ==
- Louise Litterick: "Hayne van Ghizeghem", in The New Grove Dictionary of Music and Musicians, ed. Stanley Sadie. 20 vol. London, Macmillan Publishers Ltd., 1980. ISBN 1-56159-174-2
- Litterick, Louise. Hayne van Ghizeghem. Grove Music Online. Oxford Music Online. (subscription required)
- Gustave Reese, Music in the Renaissance. New York, W.W. Norton & Co., 1954. ISBN 0-393-09530-4
- Clemens Goldberg: "Was zitiert Compere; Zitat, Topos, Zitat und Paraphrase in den Regrets-Chansons von Hayne van Ghizeghem und Loyset Compère, Bärenreiter 1996, p. 88-99. Download
- Marix, Jeanne. “Hayne van Ghizeghem: Musician at the Court of the 15thCentury Burgundian Dukes.” The Musical Quarterly, vol. 28, no. 3, 1942, pp. 276–287. JSTOR, www.jstor.org/stable/739257, https://doi.org/10.2307/739257.
