= Loyset Compère =

Franco-Flemish Renaissance composer

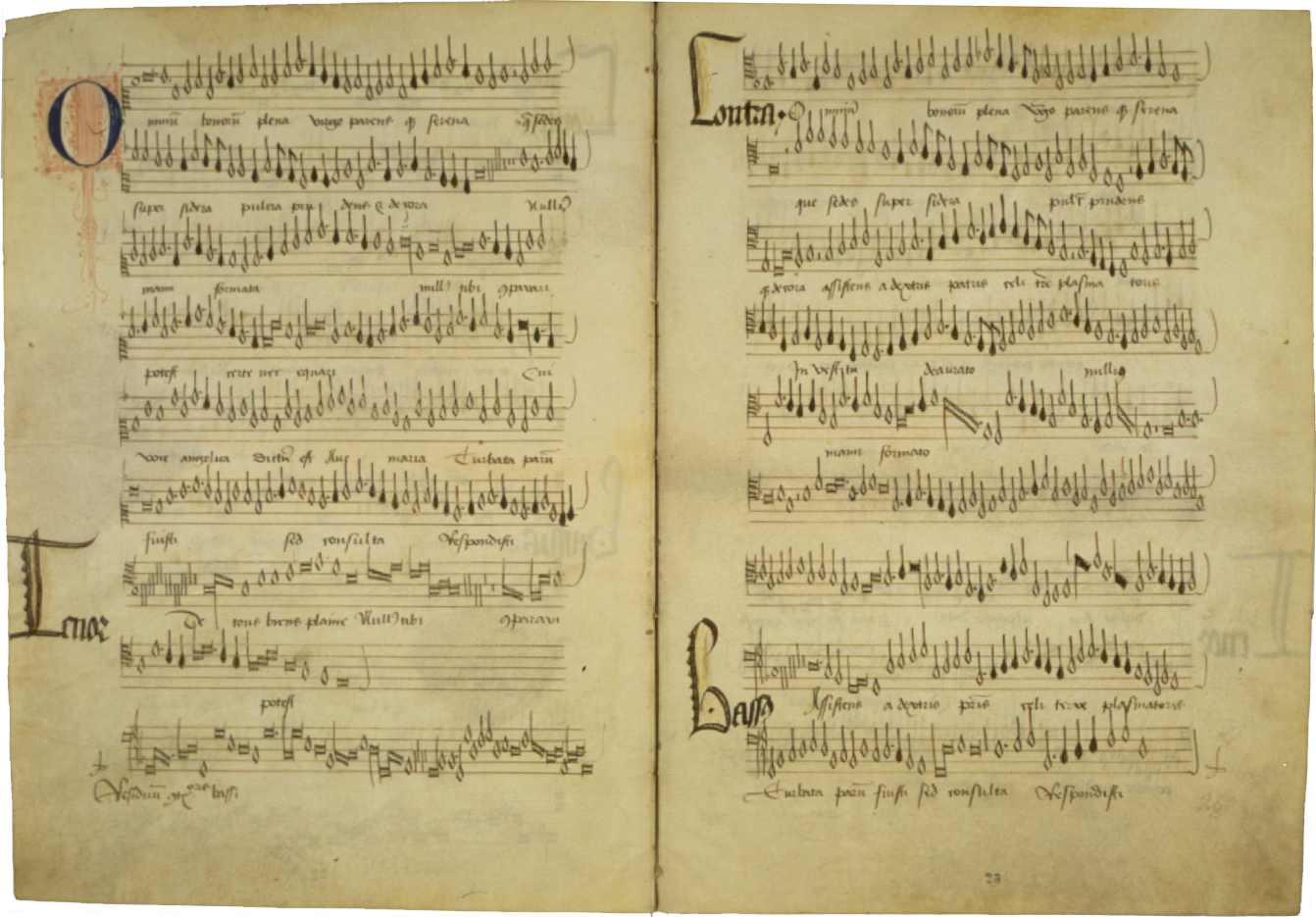
Manuscript of Omnium bonorum plena, a motet by Compère, and possibly his earliest surviving work; the exact date is uncertain, but it was possibly written for the dedication of Cambrai Cathedral on 2 July 1472.

Loyset Compère (c. 1445 – 16 August 1518) was a Franco-Flemish composer of the Renaissance. Of the same generation as Josquin des Prez, he was one of the most significant composers of motets and chansons of that era, and one of the first musicians to bring the light Italianate Renaissance style to France.

== Life ==
His exact place of birth is not known, but documents of the time assign him to a family from the province of Artois (in modern France), and suggest he may have been born in Hainaut (in modern Belgium). At least one source from Milan indicates he described himself as coming from Arras, also in Artois. Both the date and probable place of birth are extremely close to those of Josquin des Prez; indeed the area around the current French-Belgian border produced an astonishing number of excellent composers in the 15th and 16th centuries, composers whose fame spread throughout Europe. Often these composers are known as the Franco-Flemish or Netherlandish School).

In the 1470s Compère worked as a singer in Milan at the chapel of Duke Galeazzo Maria Sforza, during the time that composers such as Johannes Martini and Gaspar van Weerbeke were also singing there. The chapel choir in the early 1470s grew into one of the largest and most famous singing ensembles in Europe. After the murder of the duke in 1476, Compère appears to have been "laid off" from the chapel, and he may have returned to France at this time. Sometime during the next ten years he began to work at the French court, and he accompanied Charles VIII on his invasion of Italy in 1494 (in what capacity is not known). He was in Rome in early 1495 during the occupation of the city by Charles and his army.

Next he had a series of church positions. By 1498 Compère was at Cambrai, and from 1500 to around 1504 he was at Douai; his final appointment was at the collegiate church of Saint-Quentin. Throughout this time he seems to have been in part-time service to the French court, as evidenced by his many compositions for official and ceremonial occasions. He died at Saint-Quentin.

== Works ==
Unlike his contemporaries, Compère seems to have written few masses (at least very few survive). By temperament he seems to have been a miniaturist, and his most popular and numerous works were in the shorter forms of the day—primarily chansons and motets. Two stylistic trends are evident in his music: the style of the Burgundian School, which he seems to have learned in his early career before coming to Italy, and the lighter style of the Italian composers current at the time, who were writing frottolas (the light and popular predecessor to the madrigal). Compère had a gift for melody, and many of his chansons became popular; later composers used several as cantus firmi for masses. Occasionally he seems to have given himself a formidable technical challenge and set out to solve it, such as writing quodlibets (an example is Au travail suis, which combines no less than six different tunes written to the same text by different composers).

Compère wrote several works in a unique form, sometimes called a free motet, which combines some of the light elegance of the Italian popular song of the time with the contrapuntal technique of the Netherlanders. Some mix texts from different sources, for instance a rather paradoxical Sile fragor which combines a supplication to the Virgin Mary with a drinking song dedicated to Bacchus. His choice of secular texts tended towards the irreverent and suggestive.

His chansons are his most characteristic compositions, and many scholars of Renaissance music consider them to be his best work. They are for three or four voices, and are in three general categories: Italianate, light works for four a cappella voices, very much like frottolas, with text set syllabically and often homophonically, and having frequent cadences; three-voice works in the Burgundian style, rather like the music of Dufay; and three-voice motet-chansons, which resemble the medieval motet more than anything else. In these works the lowest voice usually sings a slow-moving cantus firmus with a Latin text, usually from chant, while the upper voices sing more animated parts, in French, on a secular text.

Many of Compère's compositions were printed by Ottaviano Petrucci in Venice, and disseminated widely; obviously their availability contributed to their popularity. Compère was one of the first composers to benefit from the new technology of printing, which had a profound impact on the spread of the Franco-Flemish musical style throughout Europe.

Compère also wrote several settings of the Magnificat (the hymn of praise to the Virgin Mary, from the first chapter of the Gospel of Luke), as well as numerous short motets.

== Works list ==
=== Masses and mass fragments ===
1. Missa alles regretz;
2. Missa de tous bien plaine; based on the chanson by Hayne van Ghizeghem. The partial manuscript was lost in Berlin during WWII and rediscovered in the early 1990s in Kraków. This allowed identification of sources of the complete mass in medieval copies found in choirbooks in Cividale and Dresden.
3. Missa l'homme armé;
4. Kyrie et Gloria sine nomine;
5. Credo 'Mon pére';
6. Credo sine nomine.

=== Motet cycles (substitution masses) ===
These are cycles of motets, in which each motet is to be sung in place of a section of the mass ordinary or one of the Proper chants. In the list, the motet is given along with the name of the Proper chant or mass ordinary section:

1. Ave Domine Jesu Christe (Missa de D.N.J.C). Ave Domine Jesu Christe (Introit); Ave Domine Jesu Christe (Gloria); Ave Domine Jesu Christe, (Credo); Ave Domine Jesu Christe (Offertory); Salve, salvator mundi (Sanctus); Adoramus te, Christe (Elevation); Parce, Domine (Agnus dei); Da pacem, Domine (Deo Gratias).

2. Hodie nobis de virgine(Missa in Nativitate Deus Noster Jesu Christe). Hodie nobis de Virgine (Introit); Beata Dei Genitrix Maria (Gloria); Hodie nobis Christus natus est (Credo); Genuit puerpera Regem (Offertory); Verbum caro factum est (Sanctus); Memento, salutis auctor (Elevation); Quem vidistis, pastores (Agnus dei); O admirabile commercium (Deo Gratias).

3. Missa Galeazescha (Missa de Beata Maria Virgine); Ave virgo gloriosa (Introit); Ave, salus infirmorum (Gloria); Ave, decus Virginale (Credo); Ave, sponsa verbi summi (Offertorii); O Maria (Sanctus); Adoramus te, Christe (Elevation); Salve, mater salvatoris (Agnus dei); Virginis Mariae laudes (Deo Gratias).

=== Magnificats ===
1. Magnificat I toni;
2. Magnificat IV toni (Esurientes only);
3. Magnificat VI toni (I);
4. Magnificat VI toni (II);
5. Magnificat VII toni;
6. Magnificat VIII toni (Esurientes only).

=== Motets ===
1. Ad honorum tuum Christe;
2. Asperges me Domine;
3. Ave Maria, gratia plena;
4. Crux triumphans;
5. Gaude prole regia / Sancta Catharina (1501);
6. O admirabile commercium;
7. Officium de cruce (In nomine Jesu);
8. O genitrix gloriosa;
9. Omnium bonorum plena (before 1474, possibly for the dedication of Cambrai Cathedral on 5 July 1472);
10. Paranymphus salutat virginem;
11. Profitentes unitatem;
12. Propter gravamen;
13. Quis numerare queat / Da pacem (probably composed either on the occasion of the Peace of Etaples, 3 November 1492, or for the treaty between Pope Alexander VI and Charles VIII on 15 January 1495)
14. Sile fragor;
15. Sola caret monstris / Fera pessima (1507);
16. Virgo caelesti.

=== Motets-Chansons ===
1. Le corps / Corpusque meum;
2. Male bouche / Circumdederunt me;
3. Plaine d'ennuy / Anima mea;
4. Tant ay d'ennuy / O vos omnes (=O devotz cueurs /O vos omnes).

=== Chansons à trois voix ===
1. A qui diraige ma pensée;
2. Au travail suis;
3. Beaulté d' amours;
4. Bergeronette savoysienne;
5. Chanter ne puis;
6. Des trois la plus;
7. Dictes moy toutes;
8. Discant adieu a madame (I);
9. En attendant;
10. Faisons boutons (Text: Jean II);
11. Guerisses moy;
12. La saison en est;
13. Le grant dèsir d'aymer;
14. Le renvoy;
15. Mes pensées;
16. Ne doibt on prendre (poem by John II, Duke of Bourbon (contrafactum on the piece by Costanzo Festa on the poem Venite amanti by Poliziano));
17. Ne vous hastez pas (=Adieu a madame (II).);
18. Pensant au bien;
19. Pleut or a Dieu;
20. Pour estre ou nombre;
21. Puis que si bien;
22. Reveille toy franc cueur;
23. Se j'ay parlé (texte: Henry Baude);
24. Se mieulx ne vient (adaptation d'une chanson de P. Convert);
25. Se pis ne vient;
26. Seray je vostre mieulx amée (not present in the complete works of Compère in Fallow's edition)
27. Sourdes regrets;
28. Tant ha bon oeul;
29. Tout mal me vient;
30. Va-t-en regret (poem by John II, Duke of Bourbon);
31. Venes regrets;
32. Vive le noble roy de France;
33. Vous me faittes morir d'envie (poem by John II, Duke of Bourbon).

=== Chansons ===
1. Alons fere nos barbes (possibly apocryphal);
2. De les mon getes = Voles oir une chanson);
3. Et dont revenes-vous;
4. Gentil patron;
5. J'ay un syon sur la porte;
6. Je suis amie d'un fourrier;
7. L'aultre jour me chevauchoye;
8. Mon pére m'a donné mari;
9. Nous sommes de l'ordre de St Babouin;
10. Royne du ciel;
11. Une plaisante fillette;
12. Un franc archier;
13. Vostre bargeronette.

=== Frottole ===
1. Che fa la ramacina;
2. Scaramella fa la galla.

=== Attributed or doubtful works ===
1. Ave regina, cælorum (anonymous, but attributed to Compère);
2. Cayphas (attributed to both Johannes Martini and Compère);
3. Lourdault lourdault garde que tu feras (attributed to both Compère and Ninot le Petit; scholarly consensus currently favoring Compère);
4. Mais que ce fust (attributed to both Compère and Pietrequin Bonnel);
5. O post partum munda (anonymous, attributed to Compère);
6. Sanctus - O sapientia (doubtful due to stylistic reasons);
7. Se non dormi dona (anonymous, attributed to Compère);
8. Se (Si) vous voulez que je vous face (anonymous but in Compère's style);
9. Vray dieu quel payne (multiple attributions, including Gaspar van Weerbeke, Jean Japart, and Matthaeus Pipelare).

== Recording ==
- 1993 - The Orlando Consort, "Loyset Compère", Metronome.
- 1997 - Virelai. "Renaissance Love Songs". BBC Music Magazine, Volume 5 No. 6, February 1997 (free audio CD). Contains a recording of Le grant desir performed by Virelai and Catherine Bott.
- 2002 - Prioris: Requiem. Eufoda 1349. Contains a recording of O vos omnes.
- 2017 - Odhecaton, "Missa Galeazescha. Music for the duke of Milan", Out There Music.
