= Johannes Martini =

Franco-Flemish composer

Johannes Martini (c. 1440 – late 1497 or early 1498) was a Franco-Flemish composer of the Renaissance.

== Life ==
He was born in Brabant around 1440, but information about his early life is scanty. He probably received his early training in Flanders, as did most of the composers of his generation. Sometime before 1473, he became associated with the ducal chapel in Ferrara, Italy, where Ercole I d'Este was attempting to build a musical establishment on the part of some of the other aristocratic centres in Italy.

He was a member of the famous Milan chapel of the Sforza family in July 1474, along with Loyset Compère, Gaspar van Weerbeke, and some of the other composers from northern Europe who were part of the first wave of Franco-Flemish influence in Italy. In November, he returned to Ferrara. What prompted him to leave and return is not known, but since the Milanese chapel was then the most renowned in Europe, it is possible he went to investigate the competition for his employer as much as to improve his own singing and compositional skill. However, he must have returned to Milan, since he is listed along with Jean Japart, Colinet de Lannoy, and Compère, to be given a safe pass for exit from Milan on 6 February 1477, following the 1476 assassination of Duke Galeazzo Maria Sforza.

Martini was well-rewarded by his employer, receiving not only an unusually large salary for his position in the chapel, but also his own house in Ferrara.

In 1486 he travelled to Hungary as part of the group from Ferrara involved in the installation of his employer's young son Ippolito d'Este (1479-1529) as Archbishop of Esztergom, and in 1487 and 1488 he made two separate trips to Rome to negotiate the benefices given to him by Duke Ercole.

== Music and influence ==
Martini wrote Masses, motets, psalms, hymns, and some secular songs, including chansons. His style is conservative, sometimes referring back to the music of the Burgundian School, especially in the Masses. Some stylistic similarity to Obrecht suggests that the two may have known each other, or at the very least, Martini may have seen Obrecht's music. Obrecht was a guest in Ferrara in 1487, and his music is known to have circulated in Italy in the early 1480s.

Some of the earliest examples of the paraphrase Mass are by Martini. His Missa domenicalis and Missa ferialis, which have been tentatively dated to the 1470s at the earliest, use the paraphrase technique in the tenor voice – the normal voice for carrying the cantus firmus – but also include the same melodic material in other voices at the start of points of imitation. The paraphrase technique was to become one of the predominant methods of mass composition in the early 16th century.

In addition to his mostly conservative output of masses, he is the first composer known to have set psalms for double choir singing antiphonally. This style, which was to become famous in Venice under the direction of Adrian Willaert seventy years later, seems to have had no influence at the time: yet it was a striking innovation.

His secular music is in both French and Italian.

== Sources and further reading ==
- Article "Johannes Martini", in The New Grove Dictionary of Music and Musicians, ed. Stanley Sadie. 20 vol. London, Macmillan Publishers Ltd., 1980. ISBN 1-56159-174-2
- J. Peter Burkholder: "Borrowing", Grove Music Online, ed. L. Macy (Accessed 5 November 2006), (subscription access)
- Gustave Reese, Music in the Renaissance. New York, W.W. Norton & Co., 1954. ISBN 0-393-09530-4
- Fabrice Fitch: "Colinet de Lannoy", Grove Music Online, ed. L. Macy (Accessed 30 June 2007), (subscription access)
