= Ottaviano Petrucci =

Italian printer

Ottaviano Petrucci (18 June 1466 – 7 May 1539) was an Italian printer. His Harmonice Musices Odhecaton, a collection of chansons printed in 1501, is commonly misidentified as the first book of sheet music printed from movable type. Actually, that distinction belongs to the Roman printer Ulrich Han's Missale Romanum of 1476. Nevertheless, Petrucci's later work was extraordinary for the complexity of his white mensural notation and the smallness of his font, and he did in fact print the first book of polyphony using movable type. He also published numerous works by the most highly regarded composers of the Renaissance, including Josquin des Prez and Antoine Brumel.

== Life ==
He was born in Fossombrone (Pesaro), and probably was educated at Urbino. Around 1490 he went to Venice to learn the art of printing, and in 1498 he petitioned the Doge for the exclusive right to print music for the next 20 years. The right was very probably granted, since no examples of printed music from other Venetian printers are known before 1520. In 1501 he produced his first book of music, 96 chansons, as the Harmonice musices odhecaton A (sometimes referred to as "the Odhecaton"), which is the earliest known example of printed polyphonic music. In the following years he continued to refine his technique, producing new editions and reprints every few months until 1509, when his activity was interrupted by the war of the League of Cambrai against Venice; he departed the city for Fossombrone, where he resumed his activities as a printer.

Fossombrone being within the papal states, Petrucci applied for a patent with the Pope for the exclusive right to print music, which was granted for several years; however the Pope rescinded the patent when Petrucci failed to produce keyboard music, granting it instead to one of Petrucci's competitors at Rome. In 1516 papal troops ransacked Fossombrone, and Petrucci printed nothing for three years: most likely his equipment was destroyed. The competitor who took Petrucci's printing privilege away from him in Rome, Andrea Antico, also took over his printing business in Venice in 1520. During the 1520s Petrucci seems to have made his living managing a paper mill.

In 1536, he returned to Venice at the request of the civic authorities there, and assisted them in printing Greek and Latin texts.

He died there in 1539.

== Significance ==
A total of 61 music publications by Petrucci are known. By far the most fruitful period of his life for publishing music was the period between 1501 and 1509, during which he published the three volumes of chansons (the Odhecaton being the first), 16 books of masses, five books of motets, 11 anthologies of frottole and six books of music for lute. The last publication is dated 1520.

Petrucci was not the first music printer in Europe – a number of liturgical works with woodcut music were printed before 1500, with the first, the Constance Gradual, printed about 1473, and works using movable type were printed beginning with Ulrich Han's Missale Romanum in 1476. He was, however, the first to print in quantity and the first to print polyphonic music, and the quality of his printings was outstanding.

Petrucci's technique required three impressions; each sheet of music would be run through the presses once for the staves, once for the music, and once for the words. Petrucci was highly successful at this enterprise; his publications are quite exact and beautifully executed. However, other printers using this method sometimes offset their prints slightly, which could result in notes being printed too high or too low on the staff – and thus jarringly incorrect for performers. Petrucci's method was soon superseded by the innovations attributed to Pierre Attaignant, who developed and popularized the single-impression method of printing in 1528.

The printing of music made possible the development of the first truly international musical style since the unification of Gregorian Chant in the 9th century. Printed music moved around Europe during the migration of Franco-Flemish composers from their home areas in the modern day Low Countries to Italy, Germany, Spain, Poland and elsewhere; the polyphonic style of the Franco-Flemish became an international language, with later regional variations.

== See also ==
- International Music Score Library Project
- List of publications by Ottaviano Petrucci
