= Alexander Agricola =

Netherlandish composer (1457/8–1506)

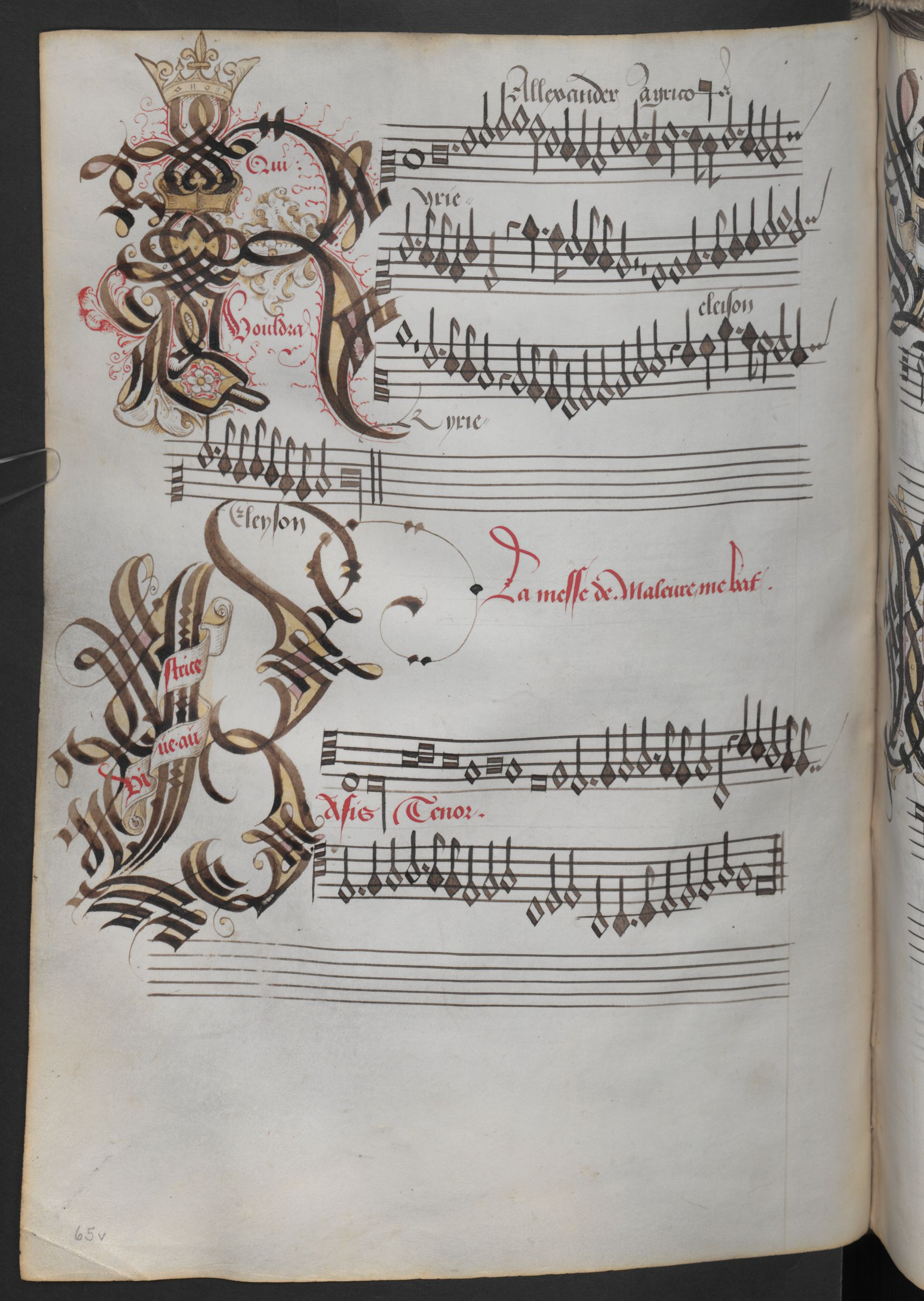
Agricola's Missa Malheur me bat as it appears in the choirbook A-Wn Cod. 1783, 65v. The name of the composer is given as "Allexandre agricoLA", with the LA represented by a solmisation symbol.

Alexander Agricola (/əˈɡrɪkələ/; born Alexander Ackerman; c. 1446 – 15 August 1506) was a Netherlandish composer of the Renaissance writing in the Franco-Flemish style. A prominent member of the Grande chapelle, the Habsburg musical establishment, he was a renowned composer in the years around 1500, and his music was widely distributed throughout Europe. He composed music in all of the important sacred and secular styles of the time.

== Life ==
Agricola was the son, born out of wedlock, of Lijsbette Naps, a wealthy female merchant who lived in Ghent. He was probably born sometime in the late 1450s and had a brother named Jan. A commemorative motet first published in 1538 gave his age as 60 at the time of his death in 1506, but that may be due to a medieval convention concerning the number 60. He may have received his musical training from the parish church of St Nicolas in Ghent, as his mother made a substantial donation to its musical establishment in 1467. In 1476 he is known to have been in Cambrai, in the Low Countries, where he was employed as a petit vicaire or singer from February to May.

Most of his life he spent in posts in Italy, France and the Low Countries, though there are gaps where his activities are not known, and he seems to have left many of his posts without permission. Agricola was previously identified as the Alessandro d'Alemagna who served as a singer for Duke Galeazzo Maria Sforza of Milan from 1471 to 1474, during the period when the Milanese chapel choir grew into one of the largest and most famous ensembles in Europe; Loyset Compère, Johannes Martini, Gaspar van Weerbeke, and several other composer-singers were also in Milan during those years. In 1474 Duke Galeazzo Maria wrote a letter of recommendation for a certain "Alexander de Alamania" to Lorenzo de' Medici. That identification has since been questioned because the Milanese documents do not record the surname of this Alessandro d'Alemagna, and Agricola is from Flanders, not Germany. The earliest unambiguous references to Agricola remain the documents at Cambrai.

For the long period from 1476 to 1491 nothing definite is known except that he spent part of the time in the French royal chapel, and he must have been building his reputation as a composer during this time, for he was much in demand in the 1490s, with France and Naples competing for his services. Between 1 October 1491 and 1 June 1492 Agricola served as part of the cathedral chapel in Florence. In April 1492 Charles VIII of France wrote a letter to Pietro de Medici asking for the return of Agricola, which implies that he had been serving in the French royal chapel for an unknown duration beforehand. Agricola was briefly in Naples in June 1492, although King Ferrante had to relinquish him at the request of Charles VIII. Ferrante tried to reacquire Agricola from Charles VIII during 1493, at one point offering him a salary of 300 ducats a year. However Ferrante's enthusiasm cooled during the rest of 1493 as the situation in Italy deteriorated (war broke out in the next year) and he told Agricola to not come to Naples. Despite this, Agricola seemed to have returned to Naples (now ruled by Ferrante's son Alfonso) in 1494, staying for some time between February and March.

After this the paper trail for Agricola runs cold until the spring of 1500, when he took a position with Philip the Handsome, who was Duke of Burgundy and became King of Castile upon the death of his mother-in-law in 1504. Agricola accompanied Philip on his travels through his extensive lands, which included two trips to Spain in 1501 and 1506, passing through France during the first trip and England in the second. He served alongside fellow composer Pierre de la Rue, and was paid the same salary; he also received benefices in Gorinchem and Valenciennes Other composers present in Philip's chapel during this time includes Marbrianus de Orto and Antonius Divitis. By this time Agricola was one of the most esteemed composers in Europe. Petrucci brought out a collection of his masses in 1504, an honour accorded to few composers before him. His motet Si dedero survives in over thirty sources and both Jacob Obrecht and Divitis wrote masses based on it. Josquin paid homage to Agricola in his Missa Faisant regretz by borrowing the ostinato idea first used in his four voice Tout a par moy, which is in turn based on Frye's chanson. Works by Agricola, La Rue and Josquin make up the bulk of the choir book B–Br MS 9126, which was prepared just before Philip's second trip to Spain.

Agricola was still receiving his salary up until 22 July 1506, when the court was in Valladolid. However, his name is not included in the chapel payments in October which was authorised shortly after Philip's death. Agricola's own death on 15 August 1506 is confirmed by an epitaph found in a 16th-century manuscript in Brussels, it reads: Epitaph. Here lies one whom death ensnared: a Ghenter, formerly called Master Alexander Agricola, well spoken of in music. Death dispatched him on 15 August 1506: God grant that he be comforted and seated among the righteous. Amen.

== Musical style ==
=== Related schools and composers ===
Agricola is one of the few transitional figures between the Burgundian School and the style of the Josquin generation of Netherlanders who actually wrote music in both styles.

Agricola's style is related to that of Johannes Ockeghem, especially early in his career, and towards the end of his life he was writing using the pervasive imitation characteristic of Josquin des Prez. While few of his works can be dated precisely, he does use many of the non-imitative, complex, rhythmically diverse contrapuntal procedures more often associated with Ockeghem. Unlike Ockeghem, however, he was willing to employ repetition, sequence, and florid imitation in the manner of the other composers who were working around 1500 when the technique became widespread.

=== Genres ===
Agricola wrote masses, motets, motet-chansons, secular songs in the prevailing formes fixes such as rondeaux and bergerettes, other chansons, and instrumental music. Much of his instrumental music was based on secular music by Gilles Binchois or Ockeghem. Many of these pieces had become quite popular in the late 15th century.

=== Compositional hallmarks ===
Opening 14 bars of Agricola's Salve Regina I. Typeset from B-Br-9126.

Above all the variants in his general musical style over his working life, Agricola himself wrote in a highly distinctive style, taking the mysteriously sinuous lines of Ockeghem as his point of departure. His music is often very busy and highly detailed, with repeated sequence, repetition of terse rhythmic and motivic units, and a desire to usurp the underlying pulse, sometimes seeming to border on the perverse, either by prolonging cadential figures to cadence on the "wrong" beat, or by shifting the metrical beat of some parts against others. As an example, the closing Agnus Dei of his unusually extended Missa 'In myne zin' features the cantus firmus stated in equal notes of eleven minims duration each in first statement, followed by a statement of five minims duration each, or in the second Salve Regina setting, offsetting part of the statement of the cantus firmus by a quaver for its entire duration, in both cases with the other voices proceeding in a more strict quadruple meter above.

Other "games" played in the music include posing puzzles of mode and musica ficta for the performers (e.g. the Kyrie of the Missa Le serviteur plays with the expectations of the very well known plainchant cantus firmus by setting up some knotty issues of the implied possibility of modal inflection with consistent extra flats.) The music is characteristically athletic in all voice parts, with the lower parts in particular featuring much that requires very fine singers, and not representing the normal simply harmonic function of the tenor-bass combinations used by most of his contemporaries. Often a highly elaborate set of quick motifs will spring unexpected from a previous slow-moving texture (e.g. the eruption of detailed duos beginning at Glorificamus te and climaxing at Adoramus te in the Gloria of the Missa in myne zin).

His music was very highly regarded in its day, the very distinctive style leading to one contemporary commentator referring to it as "crazy", and another as "sublime".

Agricola, Missa In mine sin, Agnus Dei III, Bassus. From the Chigi Codex.

== Other Agricolas ==
There are other composers named Agricola who are sometimes confused with Alexander:

- Martin Agricola (1486–1556; famous mainly as a theorist and teacher)
- Johannes Agricola (1494–1566), German Protestant reformer and humanist
- Johann Agricola Eisleben junior (before 1560–1594)
- Wolfgang Christoph Agricola (c. 1600 – c. 1659)
- Johann Paul Agricola (1638 or 1639–1697)
- Georg Ludwig Agricola (1643–1676; also an important writer)
- Johann Friedrich Agricola (1720–1774; also a musicographer, organist and singing master)
