= Capilla flamenca (Spain) =

The Flemish chapel (Spanish: capilla flamenca) was one of two choirs employed by King Philip II of Spain, the other being the Spanish chapel (or capilla española). Deriving from the Grand Chapelle of King Philip the Handsome of Castile, the choir served under various forms until the reign of Charles II of Spain.

== La Grande Chapelle ==
Philip I of Castile, "Philip the Handsome", son of Maximilian I, Holy Roman Emperor and Mary of Burgundy, enlarged the Grande Chapelle in the Netherlands whose members included Alexander Agricola and Pierre de La Rue. Following his marriage to Juana of Castile (1496) the chapel accompanied him to the summit in Toledo, Spain in 1502 and again to Spain in 1505 where he died suddenly at Burgos in 1506, though was not buried for three years until his widow Juana "the mad" was committed to an asylum in 1508, when the Grand Chapelle, or capilla, returned to Brussels.

== Under the regency of Margaret (regent 1506–1517) ==
Philip's sister Archduchess Margaret of Austria became regent for the infant Charles V, and she reestablished the Burgundian musical establishment at Mechelen, with the composers Antoine Brumel, Pierre de La Rue, Antoine de Longueval, and Pierrequin de Thérache and Marbrianus de Orto as director of the court chapel, la Grand Chapelle. Margaret ensured a full musical education for her nephew Charles and his older sister Mary of Austria. After Margaret died Charles appointed his sister governor of the Netherlands 1531–1555 at Brussels, where Benedictus Appenzeller was master of the court chapel. Another favourite composer of Margaret was Josquin des Prez.

== Under Charles V (reigned 1517–1556) ==
Charles V, Holy Roman Emperor attained his majority in 1515, allowing him to rule the Burgundian territories he had inherited. He gained the throne of Spain in 1517 along with the chapel choir of his grandmother Isabel the Catholic, and then in 1519 Charles became Holy Roman Emperor.

His maestros de capilla included Adrien Pickart, Thomas Crecquillon, Cornelius Canis and Nicolas Payen. Nicolas Gombert held the post of master of the choristers until his disgrace. In 1526 when Charles married Isabel of Portugal she also had her own household including the organist Antonio de Cabezón. Charles appointed his son Philip regent of Spain in 1543 then abdicated entirely in 1556 with Philip receiving Spain, the Netherlands and the possessions in the New World, while Charles' younger brother Ferdinand received the Austro-Hungarian lands of the Empire. Charles retired to the monastery of Yuste where his maestro de capilla was the monk Juan de Villamayor. Before Philip II of Spain inherited the capilla flamenca from his father, he had already inherited part of his mother's chapel in 1539, and from 1548 two chapels like those of the emperor, one in Castile one in Burgundy, the capilla flamenca, though in 1554, following his marriage to Queen Mary I of England, most of the chapel, with the exception of Cabezón, moved to the Flemish chapel.

== Under Philip II (reigned 1556–1598) ==
In 1556 Philip became King of Spain, both his and his father's Flemish chapels, and that of Spain were amalgamated into one capilla real española, though the dominant influence was still Flemish. Philip's maestros de capilla were Nicolas Payen, Pierre de Manchicourt, Jean de Bonmarché, Geert van Turnhout, George de La Hèle (assisted in his last years by Géry de Ghersem) and Philippe Rogier. Aside from Burgundian-Flemish repertory, the chapel performed music of the Roman (e.g. Palestrina) and Venetian (e.g. Andrea Gabrieli) schools.

The capilla coexisted in parallel with the Capilla Real de Granada, led by composers such as Rodrigo de Ceballos (ca. 1530–1581), and Ambrosio Cotes (1550?–1603). Philip also sponsored Tomás Luis de Victoria to study in Rome in 1556, from where he returned 1586 to serve Philip's sister the dowager empress Maria of Austria at the Convent of Las Descalzas Reales in Madrid.

== Under Philip III (reigned 1598–1621) ==
During the whole of the reign of Philip III of Spain the maestro de capilla was Mateo Romero, with assistants including Géry de Ghersem, Gabriel Díaz Bessón and Juan Bautista Comes. Philip Hispanicized the capilla and created a group of chamber musicians, including Juan Blas de Castro, along with the court violinists introduced by Philip's favourite Francisco Gómez de Sandoval y Rojas, Duke of Lerma.

The Duke of Lerma's own musical establishment flourished in Burgos at the Church of Saint Peter (Colegiata de Lerma), with Gabriel Díaz Bessón (previously maestro de capilla of the Royal Convent of La Encarnación, Madrid), serving as Lerma's capellán from 1616 till the Duke's fall from grace in 1618.

== Under Philip IV (reigned 1621–1665) ==
Philip IV of Spain had been taught as a child by Romero, who was succeeded as maestro in 1634 by Carlos Patiño, who was promoted from the junior capilla real at the Royal Convent of La Encarnación. The capilla continued in the same vein as under Philip III. However under Philip secular music developed as instrumental compositions and Spanish Villancicos and tonos humanos were composed by Juan Hidalgo de Polanco and others, in parallel with the early development of the zarzuela. The first zarzuela is considered to be El Laurel de Apolo (lost) by Pedro Calderón de la Barca with music by Hidalgo in the hunting lodge the Palacio de la Zarzuela, so called because of the thick zarzas (Spanish for brambles). The maestros of the Royal Convent of La Encarnación and Convent of Las Descalzas Reales, Madrid, also contributed to the development of theatre music.

== Under Charles II (reigned 1665–1700) ==
Charles II of Spain was the last of the Habsburg kings of Spain. The maestros of the capilla in his time were Carlos Patiño (d.1675), Cristóbal Galán (maestro de capilla 1680–1684) and Diego Verdugo (from 1697). Though the chapel took second place to the italianate court and theatre music of Joseph de Torres, Antonio Literes, and Sebastián Durón.

King

Margaret of Austria

Charles V

Philip II of Spain

Philip III of Spain
Philip IV of Spain

Masters of the Habsburg chapel

Marbriano de Orto
Antoine de Bergues
Adrian Thiebault dit Pickart
Nicolaas Carlier
Jacques Champion
Nicolas Gombert (ca.1495–ca.1560)
Thomas Crecquillon (1505–ca.1557)
Cornelius Canis (ca.1506–1562)
Nicolas Payen (1512–1559)
Pierre de Manchicourt (ca.1510–1564)
Jean de Bonmarché (ca.1520/25–1570)
Gérard de Turnhout (ca.1520–1580)
George de la Hèle (1547–1586)
Philippe Rogier (ca.1561–1596)
Géry de Ghersem (ca.1574–1630)
Mateo Romero (1575/76–1647)
Carlos Patiño (1600–1675)

From (and position)

1512, first chapel master
first chapel master
ca. 1516
?
ca. 1522
in 1526 singer, 1529 maistre des enffans
1539, maestro de capilla
1542 maître des enfants, 1547 maestro de capilla
1551, maestro de capilla
1559, maestro de capilla
1565, maestro de capilla
1572, maestro de capilla
1582, maestro de capilla
1586, maestro de capilla
1598, assistant
1598, maestro de capilla
1634, maestro de capilla

Until

1522
–
ca. 1530
ca. 1524
ca. 1535
ca. 1538
ca. 1550
1555
1559
1564
1570
1580
1586
1596
1604
1633
1637
