= La Grande Chapelle =

La Grande Chapelle is a Spanish vocal and instrumental ensemble of early sacred music, founded in 2005. Their name was taken from the musical chapel from Burgundy, where musicians like Nicolás Gombert, Philippe Rogier and Mateo Romero participated. The musicologist Albert Recasens succeeded his father the conductor Ángel Recasens as director of the ensemble following his death in August 2007.

== Formation and performances ==
The musical ensemble plays sacred music; this genre has diminished because more popular music is played in churches. Furthermore, several churches contain works still to be discovered. La Grande Chapelle is one of the groups researching in that field.

Composers of several European countries and the formal founder Ángel Recasens created the group in 2005. The diversity of musicians encourages the unity of various musical techniques and schools.

The main objective of La Grande Chapelle is to recover musical treasures, a legacy from the 16th century until the beginning of the 21st century. Another objective of the association is to perform early repertory at festivals, such as the Festival Internacional Cervantino where the vocal ensemble presented music from the 16th century, including Tomás Luis de Victoria's Mass Salve Regina (1592), and pieces dedicated to the Virgin Mary.

La Grande Chapelle has performed at different important festivals in Spain and France, such as the ones in Picardie and Haut-Jura, and Musica Sacra Maastricht, OsterKlang-Festival and at La Cité de la Musique in Paris. The ensemble has performed in Belgium, France, Hungary, Mexico, Canada, Japan and China. Their repertory includes antiphons and motets, the psalm Nisi Dominus and the Magnificat primi toni. They also perform the Missa pro Defunctis by Mateo Romero, Music for the Corpus of Joan Pau Pujol, and the mass O Gloriosa Virginum by Antonio Rodríguez de Hita.

The director Albert Recasens promoted the creation of the recording label Lauda in 2005. This company has released records focused to the exploration of the relationship between music and literature of the Golden Century. La Grande Chapelle’s recordings under this label have been recognized by the Orphée d´Or, besides being called the label of the year by the Prelude Classical Music Awards of 2007 in the Netherlands.

== Discography ==
- Entre aventuras y encantamientos. Música para Don Quijote Lauda Records 2005
- Requiem para Cervantes. Mateo Romero: Missa Pro Defunctis
- El Vuelo de Ícaro. Música para el eros barroco - Manuel Correa, Bernardo Murillo, Sebastián Durón, Mateo Romero (Maestro Capitán) Manuel Machado. 2006
- José de Nebra: Vísperas de Confesores
- Antonio Rodríguez de Hita: Canciones instrumentales
- El gran Burlador. Música para el mito de Don Juan - Cristóbal Galán, Juan Hidalgo, Bernardo Murillo, Manuel Correa, Manuel de Egüés. 2007
- Joan Pau Pujol: Música para el Corpus
- Francisco Javier García Fajer: Oficio de Difuntos
- Antonio Rodríguez de Hita: Missa "O gloriosa Virginum"
- Cristóbal Galán: Canto del alma. Obras en latín y en romance
- Juan García de Salazar: In Dominica Palmarum
- La fiesta de Pascua en Piazza Navona. Tomás Luis de Victoria, Jacobus de Kerle, Palestrina, Giovanni Animuccia, Rocco Rodio, Francisco Guerrero. 2012
