= Guerra Manuscript =

Musical manuscript by José Miguel de Guerra y Villegas

The Guerra Manuscript is an important musical manuscript copied by the nobleman and scribe José Miguel de Guerra y Villegas for the capilla real of Charles II of Spain around 1680.

The manuscript, Ms 265 at the Royal University of Santiago de Compostela, was only fully analysed, edited and published in 1998. It contains 100 tonos humanos for soprano and continuo. Many of the songs exist in other sources, such as excerpts from zarzuelas, and the composers can be identified. Composers include the senior theatre composer and master of the capilla real Juan Hidalgo, José Marín, Cristóbal Galán, Juan del Vado, Matías Ruiz, and the then young harpist Juan de Navas.

== Selected recordings ==
- The Guerra Manuscript Volume 1 - Isabel Monar (soprano) & Manuel Vilas (Spanish baroque harp). Naxos
- The Guerra Manuscript Volume 2 - Juan Sancho (tenor) Ars Atlántica, dir. Manuel Vilas (Spanish baroque harp). Naxos
- The Guerra Manuscript Volume 3 - Yetzabel Arias Fernández (soprano) Ars Atlántica, dir. Manuel Vilas (Spanish baroque harp). Naxos
