= Accentus Austria =

- Origin: Austria
- Members: Thomas Wimmer

Accentus Austria are an early music ensemble led by viola-da-gamba player Thomas Wimmer, founded in 1988.

== Discography ==
- Sephardische Romanzen

Musik der spanischen Juden um 1500, Gruppe Accentus, Ensemble für Frühe Musik, Preiser Records 90161:

1. Mi suegra. 2. Sadawi. etc.

- El Cancionero de Palacio 1505-1520 Naxos 1996.

Track list

1. Rodrigo Martinez. 2. Con amores. etc.

- Sephardic Romances. Naxos 1997:

1. Avrix mi galanica. 2. La serena. 3. Sadawi

- Misteris de Dolor. Pneuma PN-410 2004
- Romances Sefarades dans l’empire de la Sublime Porte Arcana 2006 1. Nacimiento y vocación de Abraham
- Cantadas de pasión. Sebastian Duron, Juan de Lima Serqueira, Gaspar Sanz, Juan Hidalgo, Joan Bautista Cabanilles, Lucas Ruiz de Ribayaz y Fonseca, Jose Marin, Matias Veana, Juan de Navas. Arcana.2005
- Serenata Hungarica. DHM 2012
- Cristobal Galan Ice DHM. 2013.
