= Cancionero de Turin =

Musical manuscript of Spanish secular polyphonic works

The Cancionero de Turin or Cancionero Musical de Turin is a musical manuscript that contains Spanish secular polyphonic works from the period between the end of the 16th century and the beginning of the 17th century, in the transition period between the Renaissance and the Baroque eras.

== The manuscript ==
The manuscript is kept at the National University Library (R.1–14) in Turin, Italy.

47 pieces are listed in the index section, however one of them is a duplication. Three other works—two of which are duplicates—in the manuscript are not included in the index. On the other hand, the works listed as numbers 36 and 37, Salte y baile and Mi voluntad no me dexa are in fact parts of a single work titled Por dinero baila el perro. Therefore, the cancionero contains 46 individual works. One of them is for 4 voices, 35 are for 3 voices and the ten remaining are for 2 voices. The musical forms employed are the villancico, the canción and the romance.

All the pieces are anonymous, but one of them, Sobre moradas violetas, is also found in the Cancionero de la Sablonara, attributed to the Sevillian guitarist and composer Juan de Palomares, on a text by Catalina Zamudio.

Several texts were extracted from the romancero or were written by known authors, such as Lope de Vega, Catalina Zamudio, etc.

== List of works ==
Nº	Title	Voices	Genre	Conc.	Recordings	Comments
1	Por la puente, Juana	3	Romance		FIC	The refrain is found in several 17th-century re-compilations. It's also the title of a comedy by Lope de Vega.
2	Ay, malogrados pensamientos míos	2	Canción		FIC
3	Ya no soy quien ser solía	3
4	¿Qué es esto pensamiento?	3
5	A la gineta y vestido	2
6	Adiós esperanças	3	Villancico		FIC
7	Al enredador, vecinas	3			FIC
8	Ay suspiros	3
9	Aquí ho hay que esperar	3
10	Ay, amargas soledades	2	Romance		CLA, FIC	Text: Lope de Vega
11	Volved pensamiento mío	3
12	Bella pastorcica	3	Villancico		FIC
13	¿Cómo puede temer daño?	3
14	Con çiertas desconfianças	3
15	Cómo retumban los remos	3
16	De pechos sobre una peña	3
17	¿Dónde estás, Señora mía?	3	Romance		PMA, FIC	Also known by the title Romance del Marqués de Mantua, it is cited in the novel Don Quixote.
18	Desdichada la dama	2			FIC
19	De los álamos vengo	3
20	En esta larga ausencia	2
21	Fuego de Dios	2	Romance		FIC	Calderón de la Barca wrote a comedy based on this romance.
22	Gavilán que andáis de noche	3	Villancico		FIC
23	La ocasión del mal que siento	3
24	Madre, la mi madre	5/3			PMA, FIC	Variants of the text appear in works by Lope de Vega, Calderón de la Barca and Miguel de Cervantes (El celoso extremeño). Composer Pedro Ruimonte set one of these variants to music in his Parnaso Español de madrigales y villancicos.
25	La morena graciosa	3
26	En el campo florido	3
27	Río de Sevilla	3
28	= No 4	3
29	Mal haya, quien s'enamora	3
30	No me lo pregunte, madre	3
31	No paséis, el caballero	3
32	No puedo en tus ojos bellos	2	Villancico		FIC
33	No quiero contar mi pena	4
34	Ojos no lloréis	3
35	Horas tristes y amargas	3
36	Salte y baile (Por dinero baila el perro)	3	Villancico		FIC
37	Señora, después que os vi	3
38	Vay os amores	2	Villancico		FIC
39	Sobre moradas violetas	3	Romance	SAB	FIC	Composer: Juan de Palomar — Text: Catalina Zamudio
40	Otras veces m'avéis visto	3
41	Mi querido es ido al monte	3
42	Puse mis cabellos	3
43	Pensamiento, pues dizen	3	Canción		FIC
44	Era la noche más fría	3
45	Blanda la mano	2
46	No lloréis casada	2	Villancico		FIC	It's a villancico on the subject of the mal maridada (badly married lady), of French–Provençal origin.
47	= No 12	3
48	En el más soberbio monte	3
49	= No 16	3

Concordance with other manuscripts:

- SAB - Múnich, Bayerische Staatsbibliothek, Mus. Ms. E.200 (Cancionero de la Sablonara).

== Discography ==
- 1982/1990 - [PMA] Música en la obra de Cervantes. Pro Música Antiqua de Madrid. Miguel Ángel Tallante. MEC 1028 CD
- 2002 - [CLA] Canciones de amor y de guerra. Clarincanto. Pneuma
- 2005 - [FIC] Cancionero de Turín. Musica Ficta. Raúl Mallavibarrena. Enchiriadis EN 2013.

== References and bibliography ==
- Querol Gavaldá, Miguel (1989). Cancionero musical de Turín: transcripción y estudio. Madrid: Sociedad Española de Musicología. p. 106. 978-84-86878-51-1.
- Bertini, Giovanni M. (1946). Poesie spagnole del seicento. Collezione di Classici Stranieri. Torino: Chiantore.
- Raúl Mallavibarrena's article inside the booklet of the album Cancionero de Turín by Musica Ficta.
