= Arnold von Bruck =

Franco-Flemish composer

Arnold von Bruck (also Arnold de Pruck, Arnoldus de Bruck, Arnoldus Brugensis, indicating his origin) (c. 1500 – 6 February 1554) was a Franco-Flemish composer of Renaissance music, active in several Habsburg courts. He was one of the most famous and influential composers in German-speaking areas during the first half of the 16th century, the period of the Protestant Reformation; however, he seems to have remained a Roman Catholic.

== Life ==
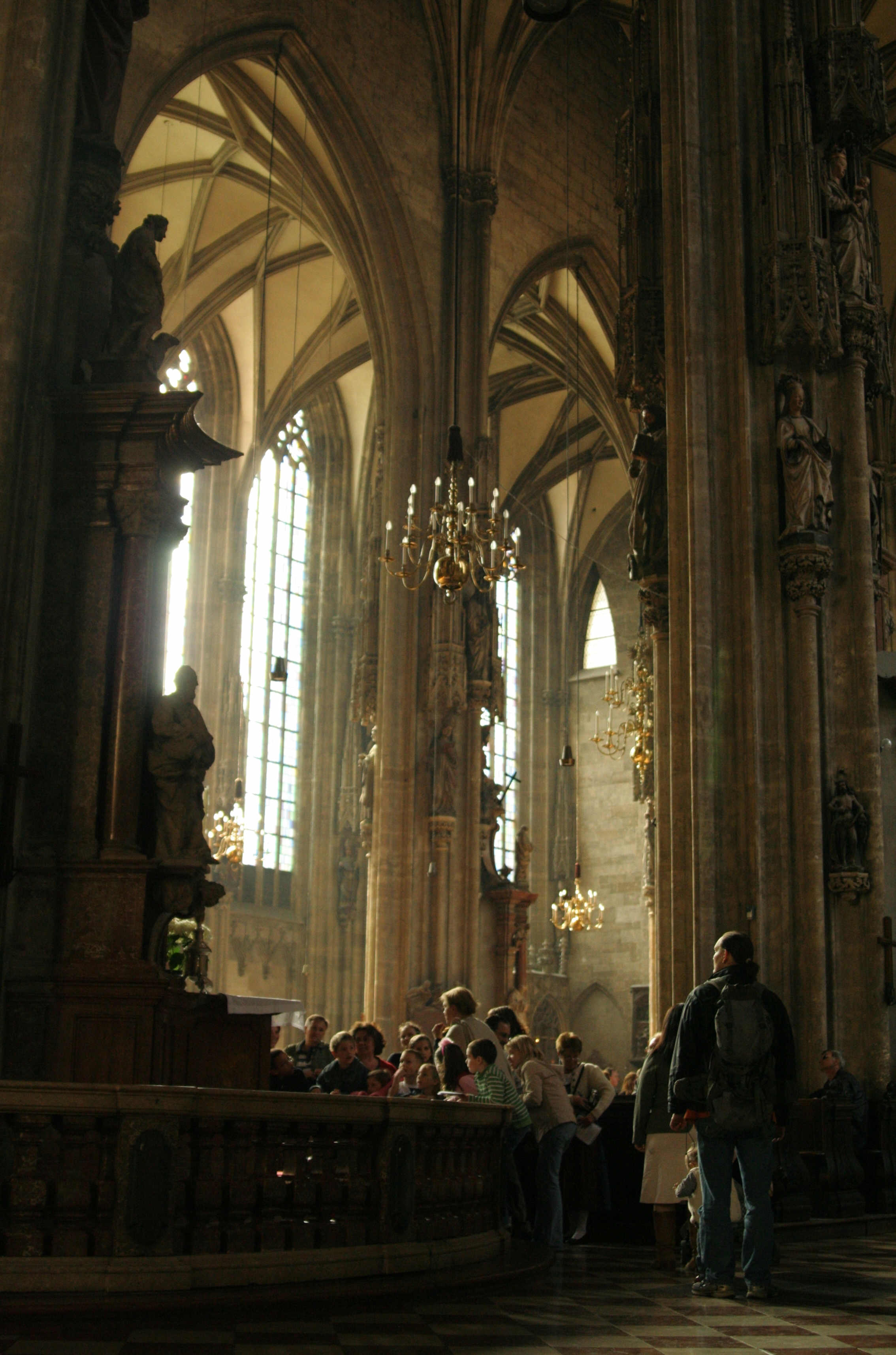
Bruck worked at the Stephansdom in Vienna, Austria, and wrote music for the chapel choir in the 1540s.

He was born in Bruges, and received at least part of his musical training as a choirboy in the chapel of Charles V, where he probably studied with Marbrianus de Orto. Pierre de La Rue was also a member of that chapel, which was one then of the most distinguished musical organizations in Europe. Bruck likely left around 1519, and his whereabouts are unknown until 1527, when he became a priest in the Pas-de-Calais, in the Thérouanne diocese. That same year he became court Kapellmeister for Archduke Ferdinand, before he was emperor; Bruck was to retain this post for all of his active career, retiring at the end of 1545.

He held many other posts and received honors during his tenure as Kapellmeister, some in distant parts of the Empire. Some of the places at which he was granted positions or honors included Ljubljana Cathedral, Zagreb Cathedral, and Kočevje, in modern Slovenia. Beginning in 1543, Pieter Maessens joined him in the Viennese court chapel as assistant Kapellmeister; Maessens took over the post of principal Kapellmeister on Bruck's retirement on 1 January 1546. Some time after this date Bruck moved to Vienna, and in 1548 to Linz. He continued to compose after his retirement, completing some works for the choir of Stephansdom in Vienna in 1547. He died in Linz.

== Music and influence ==
Bruck was one of the most respected composers in the German portion of the Habsburg domains during the first half of the 16th century. He wrote numerous vocal works, including motets, Magnificats, and both sacred and secular German songs. Many of the secular songs are quodlibets. One of his songs, Ihr Christen allgleiche, was written on the occasion of the Siege of Vienna in 1529 by the Ottoman Turks.

His sacred music on Latin texts is similar in style to the music of Josquin and his generation; Brock avoided the dense, pervasive imitation and full textures of contemporary Franco-Flemish composers such as Nicolas Gombert. He wrote a four-voice setting of the Dies Irae, as well as a Te Deum. Some of his motets were written with a pedagogical intent, probably for training his choirboys. It is presumed that only a small fraction of his sacred music on Latin texts survives, since most of the music associated with the chapels at which he worked, both in Vienna and for Emperor Ferdinand, has been destroyed.

Some of Arnold von Bruck's chorales appeared in a highly cosmopolitan collection by Georg Rhau, the Newe deudsche geistliche Gesenge of 1544. Unusually for the time, it contained music both by the early generation of Protestants, including Balthasar Resinarius and Sixtus Dietrich, and Roman Catholics such as Bruck. Bruck's contributions are for four voices, and include works in both Latin and German; some of the chorale settings are of tunes which were widely used for generations afterwards, such as Christ lag in Todesbanden, famously also set by J.S. Bach in his cantata Christ lag in Todes Banden, BWV 4.

Bruck's reputation was such that he received numerous dedications and awards, including medallions, sculptures, book dedications, and music. Copus Caspar, a composer known to have worked around the mid-century in Vienna, dedicated a setting of the Salve Regina to him. In spite of working in the land of Luther during the period of the Reformation, there is no evidence that Bruck ever had Protestant sympathies; indeed his esteem by Catholic monarchs and continued acquisition of high posts suggest that he remained Roman Catholic throughout his life (some previous scholars had suggested otherwise).
