= Van Turnhout =

van Turnhout is a surname. Notable people with the surname include:

- Geert van Turnhout (c. 1520–1580), Flemish composer
- Jan van Turnhout (c. 1545–1614 or 1618), Flemish composer
- Jillian van Turnhout (born 1968), Irish politician
