= María-Luz Álvarez =

Spanish soprano

María-Luz Álvarez (born in Madrid) is a Spanish soprano known for performance and recording of early music. She currently resides in Cooks Creek, Manitoba.

She studied with Max van Egmond and Peter Kooy, and has sung in the Capilla Real de Madrid, Huelgas Ensemble, Capella Figuralis of Jos van Veldhoven, Al Ayre Español and the Egidius Ensemble.

== Selected discography ==
- Canta Venetia! with Lex Eisenhardt. Etcetera
- Cantadas de pasión Accentus Austria, Thomas Wimmer (musician) Arcana
- Giacomo Facco Las Amazonas de Espana, Maria Luz Alvarez, Raquel Andueza, Los Musicos del Buen Retiro, Isabel Serrano, Antoine Ladrette.
- La Musica en Tiempos del Motin de Aranjuez, Maria Luz Alvarez, Cesar Carazo, Axivil Goyesco
- Joseph de Torres cantatas. Maria Luz Alvarez, Gabinette Armonico. Arsis
