= Cancionero de la Sablonara =

Spanish musical manuscript

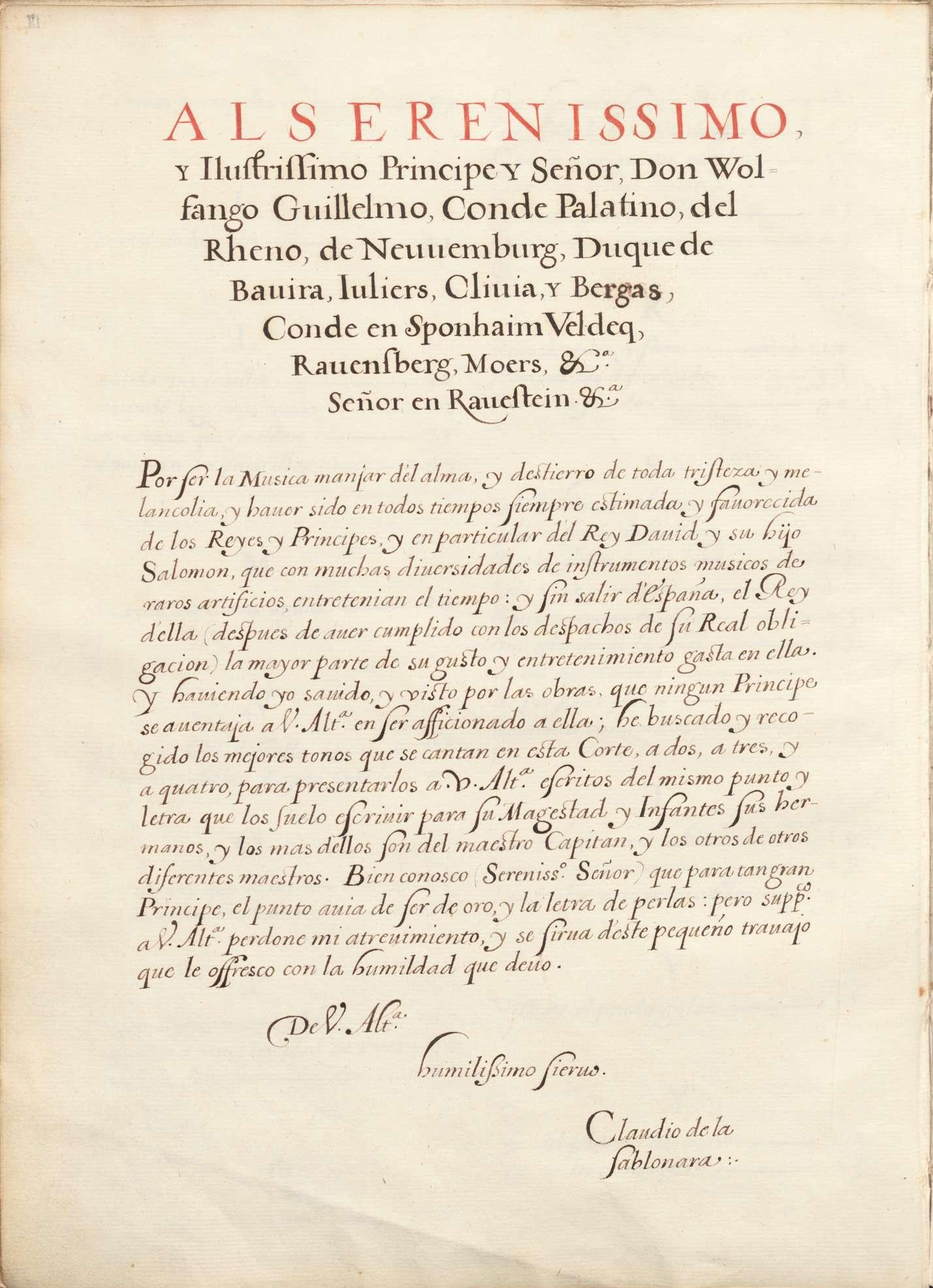
Preface page

The Cancionero de la Sablonara (preserved at the Bavarian State Library in Munich) is a Spanish manuscript (Cod.hisp. 2, formerly also known as Mus.ms. E) containing polyphonic canciones from Spain and Portugal, composed in the first quarter of the 17th century.

== The manuscript ==
The manuscript was compiled by the principal scribe of the Capilla Real of Madrid, Claudio de la Sablonara (hence the name of the manuscript) for Wolfgang Wilhelm, Count Palatine and Duke of Neuburg, during his stay in the court of Philip IV in Madrid between 1624 and 1625.

It is one of the few remnant music collections of Spanish court music from the early 17th century. Contributed to its preservation the fact that the manuscript was being kept in Munich when in 1734 a fire destroyed the Royal Alcazar of Madrid, its original place.

== Works ==
The manuscript contains 75 songs or tonos, as they were called at that time. All works are polyphonic: 32 for four voices, 31 for three voices and 12 for two voices. The works come from the Royal Chapel of Madrid and were composed by some of the most famous Spanish composers of that time: Juan Blas de Castro, Joan Pau Pujol, Mateo Romero, Álvaro de los Ríos, Gabriel Díaz Bessón, Miguel de Arizo etc. The texts of these songs were drawn from the works of great writers of the Spanish Golden Age, such as Lope de Vega.

== Bibliography ==
- Barbieri, Francisco A. (1988). Documentos sobre música española y epistolario. Madrid: Emilio Casares.
- Etzion, Judith (1996). The Cancionero de la Sablonara: A Critical Edition. Londres: Tamesis Books. 1855660474.
- Mitjana, Rafael (1919). Comentarios y apostillas al Cancionero poético y musical del siglo XVII recogido por Claudio de la Sablonara y publicado por D. Jesús Aroca. Revista de filología española 6. pp. 14–56.
- Aroca, Jesús (1916). Cancionero musical y poético recogido por Claudio de la Sablonara.
- Querol Gavalda, Miguel (1980). Cancionero musical de la Casa de la Sablonara. Madrid: CSIC.
- Pelinski, Ramón Adolfo (1969). Die weltliche Vokalmusik Spaniens am Anfang des 17. Jahrhunderts. Der Cancionero Claudio de la Sablonara. (in German)
