= Cornelius Canis =

Franco-Flemish composer, singer and choir director

Cornelius Canis (also de Hondt, d'Hondt) (between 1500 and 1510 – 15 February 1562) was a Franco-Flemish composer, singer, and choir director of the Renaissance, active for much of his life in the Grande Chapelle, the imperial Habsburg music establishment during the reign of Emperor Charles V. He brought the compositional style of the mid-16th century Franco-Flemish school, with its elaborate imitative polyphony, together with the lightness and clarity of the Parisian chanson, and he was one of the few composers of the time to write chansons in both the French and Franco-Flemish idioms.

== Life ==
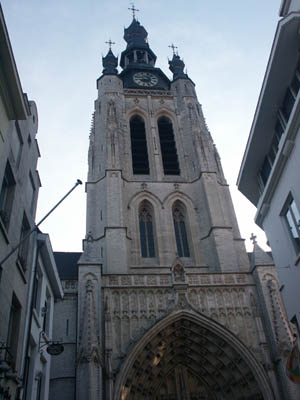
After retiring from the imperial Habsburg chapel, Cornelius Canis became a chaplain at the church of St. Martin in Kortrijk in 1557

No specific records have survived documenting his early life. He was most likely from Ghent, since a surviving letter indicates that his parents lived there, and the earliest records of his career show that he was the singing-master and teacher of the choirboys at the Onze-Lieve-Vrouw-op-de-rade confraternity, part of the Church of St. John in Ghent. He may have been part of a large musical family, since other musicians named d'Hondt, de Hondt, and Canis were active in Ghent, Kortrijk, and other places with connections to the imperial chapel during the 16th century.

In 1542, he was given the responsibility of taking four choirboys from the Low Countries to Spain, the principal seat of power of Charles V, who by then was Holy Roman Emperor. This trip is his first documented association with the imperial chapel, the Grande Chapelle. Canis's exact position in the chapel in the early 1540s has not been determined, but his reputation was good and continued to rise. During this period the musicians of the chapel rarely stayed in one place for long: they often traveled with the emperor, going to Italy, the Low Countries, or Austria as the occasion demanded. Court documents show that Canis went to places such as Utrecht and Augsburg, and was a frequent recipient of honors.

Eventually Canis became maistre des enfans (master of the choirboys) of the chapel, succeeding Nicolas Gombert. Gombert had been removed from the post around 1540, convicted of molesting one of the boys in his care, and sent to hard labor in the galleys. During this period the chapel was reorganized, and the position of maître de chapelle (overall music director) was merged with that of maistre des enfans, so Canis succeeded both Gombert and Thomas Crecquillon, the previous music director. Other musicians associated with the Spanish Habsburg chapel at that time included Nicolas Payen and organist Jean Lestainnier. Canis's music began to appear in prominent publications, such as those by Antonio Gardano and Pierre Attaingnant; most of his music dates from the years 1542 to 1558, the period of his greatest activity at the imperial court. Not all was published, and some survives in manuscript copies which were made in either Germany or the Low Countries.

Honors accumulated for Canis: he received royal prebends, pensions, an apostolic favor, and he was made abbot of two separate places: Notre Dame in Middelburg and Floresse in Liège. In 1555 he retired, probably because his employer and patron Charles V was about to abdicate; Canis's retirement occurred exactly one month before Charles gave over his powers in the Netherlands to Philip II (15 October 1555). However, this was not the end of his musical career. He became a chaplain and canon in Kortrijk, at St. Maarten and Onze Lieve Vrouwkerk respectively. He died on 15 February 1562 in Prague, which at that time was also within the Habsburg domains.

== Music and influence ==
Canis wrote both sacred and secular vocal music. No specifically instrumental music has survived, and he may not have written any.

A considerable body of music by Canis has survived, including two masses, 35 motets, and 31 chansons. The works list has grown in recent decades: three of the motets and two chansons are recent discoveries. All of his works are for from three to six voices. The two masses, Missa Pastores loquebantur and Missa super Salve celeberrima are both for six voices, while the motets and chansons all vary from three to six.

Canis's motets are written in the manner of the post-Josquin generation of Franco-Flemish composers, using a wide variety of contrapuntal procedures carried out with considerable skill. Imitation is often pervasive, and may be either strict or free; the time interval separating successive voices in imitation may be either very short or long. Canis also strove for contrast by varying his contrapuntal procedures in successive sections of the same composition, and by writing melodic lines which varied from short to wide-ranging.

Contrasting with the elaborate polyphonic procedures he used in his sacred music, Canis's chansons show a mix of both Netherlandish polyphony and French, particularly Parisian, simplicity. During the 1540s and 1550s there were two general types of chansons being composed: the Parisian, by composers such as Clément Janequin and Claudin de Sermisy, which tended to be homophonic and written in short phrases, with only brief periods of imitation; and the Franco-Flemish, which was more polyphonic and imitative: the Franco-Flemish chansons were akin to the sacred music by the same composers. Canis used some features of the Parisian chanson, including homophony, short rhythmic units, and cadential formulae, grafting them onto an otherwise polyphonic fabric.

Some of Canis's chansons use a cantus-firmus technique, in which Canis takes a line or two of music from a pre-existing chanson, including examples by Janequin, Claudin de Sermisy, and Gombert, and reworks it in a contrapuntal texture much different from the original, but using the same words.

== Canis and musica reservata ==
The exact meaning of the phrase musica reservata has been debated by musicologists for decades, since the contemporary mentions of the term are ambiguous and contradictory. Current consensus among music scholars is that the term refers to an innovative practice which began around the middle of the 16th century, both in composition and in performance, involving 'affect' in text-setting and possibly chromaticism; that it was not a wide movement; and that it was principally a kind of music intended for connoisseurs. Cornelius Canis is one of the composers mentioned as not writing in the style of musica reservata. Shortly before Canis's departure from the imperial chapel, the Bavarian ambassador to Charles V wrote a letter to his employer, Duke Albrecht V, in which he seems to use the term in a wide sense, meaning roughly "a musical style which is new": "musica reservata will become even more fashionable now than before, [after Nicolas Payen succeeds Cornelius Canis for the position], since Canis was not able to reconcile himself to it." He therefore considered Canis to be a composer in a conservative style. The date of this letter, 28 April 1555, is shortly before Orlande de Lassus joined the musical establishment of Albrecht V in Munich; Lassus was then, and remains now, the most famous practitioner of musica reservata.

== Works, editions and recordings ==
- 10 chansons on Tota Vita. Egidius Kwartet (Et'Cetera)
- Missa Pastores loquebantur on Leiden Choirbooks III Egidius Kwartet (Et'Cetera)
