= Geert van Turnhout =

Flemish composer

Geert van Turnhout (French: Gérard de Turnhout; c. 1520 – 15 September 1580) was a Flemish composer, who became master of the Flemish chapel (capilla flamenca) in Spain.

He was born in Turnhout. He had a younger brother, also a composer, Jan van Turnhout. Turnhout was employed first at Antwerp, then at the Church of St Gummarus, Lier, Belgium, (maître de chapelle 1559), then in 1562 back to the Cathedral of Our Lady (Antwerp) where he was made maître de chant in 1563. His motets (many of which have been lost) included at least two for Saint Cecilia, probably reflecting the importance of the celebration of Cecilia's Day in the cathedral of Antwerp. On 2 May 1571 Fernando Álvarez de Toledo, 3rd Duke of Alba engaged Turnhout as maestro de capilla of the Capilla Flamenca Philip II of Spain in Madrid to succeed Jean de Bonmarché. Turnhout arrived in Madrid with a group of singers from the Low Countries. He remained there until his death, when he was succeeded by George de La Hèle.

== Works ==
- Missa ‘O Maria vernans rosa’ a 5 1570
- Sacrarum ac aliarum cantonum a 3 (Leuven, 1569): 20 motets, 20 chansons Dedicated to Adrian Dyck, notary of Antwerp, it includes a dedicatory motet to Phillip II.
- 3 motets, 10 chansons, 2 voices, 1571
- 4 Dutch songs, 4–5 voices 1572
- 5 French sacred songs, 3 voices, in 1577

== Discography ==
- chanson: En regardant on Musicians of the Chapelle de Bourgogne dir. Bernardin Van Eeckhout, L'Oiseau-Lyre OL 50 104 (LP, mono)
- Jerusalem luge and 2 chansons: Craint' et espoir. Dueil, double dueil on Leal Amour: Flemish Composers at the Court of Philip II Turnhout, Hèle, Rogier, Gombert, Payen, Manchicourt, Egidius Kwartet Etcetera 1218
- 2 chansons: Je prens en gré la dure mort. Jouÿsance vous donneray on Philippe Rogier en Spanje Capella Sancti Michaelis & Currende Consort dir. Erik Van Nevel Eufoda 1161 (1993).
