= Sigmund Salminger =

Sigismund Salminger (ca. 1500 in Munich – ca. 1554) was a former Franciscan who was baptised by Hans Hut and married. Having just arrived in Augsburg the second time he became a leader of the Augsburg Anabaptists in 1526, before imprisonment in 1527, and finally recantation and release in 1530. His name also appeared as Sigmund Salminger, Sigismund Salblinger, and Sigismund Slablinger.

He remained in Augsburg after his release and rehabilitation, penning several German hymns. In 1539 Augsburg's Fugger family arranged for Salminger to be granted a printer's license. Among his editions the most notable was that in 1548, which Salminger sponsored, edited, and published the works of the Capilla Flamenca composers Cornelius Canis, Thomas Crecquillon, Nicolas Payen and Jean L'Héritier as a tribute to the Habsburg emperor Charles V - as Cantiones selectissimae quatuor vocum, ab eximiis et praestantibus caesareae maiestatis capellae musicis. This was the first time Payen had been published, and spread the reputation of Charles' chapel further across Europe.
