= Musica Ficta (Spanish ensemble) =

Musica Ficta is a Spanish early music ensemble founded in 1992 by Raúl Mallavibarrena, who is also founder and director of Ensemble Fontegara, and of the record label Enchiriadis.

The current ensemble includes:

- Musica Ficta: Eva Juárez, Marta Infante, Alicia Berri, Miguel Bernal, Luis Vicente. Mallavibarrena (percussion and director)
- Ensemble Fontegara: Marie Nishiyama (renaissance harp), Rafael Bonavita (vihuela and renaissance guitar)

== Raúl Mallavibarrena ==
Mallavibarrena (born Oviedo 1970) studied guitar with Carmen Ross at the Conservatory of Music in Madrid, flute with Giulio Capocaccia, Music Theory with Alvaro Zaldivar, Chamber Music with Emilio Moreno, Gregorian chant with Ismael Fernández de la Cuesta, basso continuo with Guido Morini, and conducting with Martin Schmidt and Helmut Rilling. Mallavibarrena began directing choirs at age 17, specializing in music of the Renaissance and the Baroque.

A notable contribution to the rediscovery of Spanish renaissance music was the recovery and the three-volume complete recording of the 61 spiritual villanescas of Francisco Guerrero with the sponsorship of the Junta de Andalucía.

In 2005 with the orquesta Civitas Harmoniae, Musica Ficta performed, and Mallavibarrena conducted, the zarzuela “Salir el Amor del Mundo" by Sebastián Durón in the Teatro Arriaga of Bilbao.

== Discography ==
- 1997 Tomás Luis de Victoria Lamentations Pedro Ruimonte De profundis C9604
- 1998 Francisco Guerrero Motecta C9619
- 1999 Cristóbal de Morales – Réquiem. Lamentabatur Jacob. Cantus C9627 / EN2002
- 2001 Tomás Luis de Victoria – Missa Gaudeamus. Salve Regina EN2003
- 2002 Tomás Luis de Victoria – Officium Defunctorum. Vadam et circuibo. EN2006
- 2003 Francisco Guerrero – Hispalenses EN2009
- 2004 Pedro Ruimonte – Parnaso Español EN2011
- 2005 Cancionero de Turín – Canciones, romances y villancicos EN2013
- 2005 Francisco Guerrero – Villanescas (volume I) EN2014
- 2006 Alonso Lobo – Missae Simile est Regnum Caelorum. Petre ego pro te rogavi. EN2016
- 2007 Francisco Guerrero – Villanescas (volume II) EN2018
- 2008 Francisco Guerrero – Villanescas (volume III)EN2023
- 2010 Tomás Luis de Victoria – Responsories
