= Gabriel Díaz Bessón =

Spanish composer

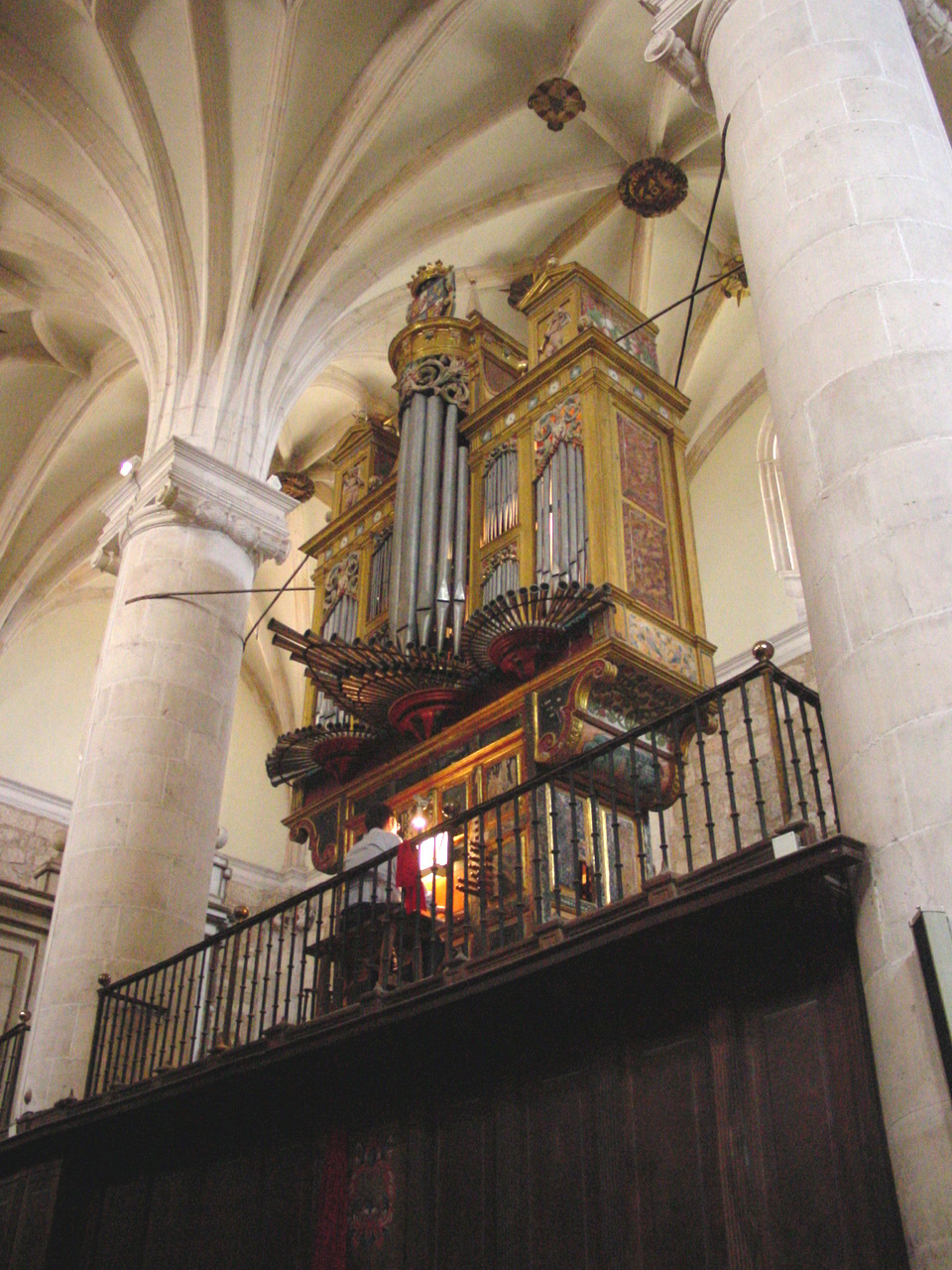

Gabriel Díaz Bessón (1590 - November 6, 1638) was a Spanish composer.

== Life and career ==
Díaz Bessón was born in Alcalá de Henares and became maestro de capilla of the Royal Convent of La Encarnación, Madrid. From 1616 he was capellán for Francisco Gómez de Sandoval y Rojas, 1st Duke of Lerma, the favourite of Philip III of Spain. The Duke maintained a musical establishment in Lerma, Burgos, where the Collegiate Church of Saint Peter was consecrated in 1617.

On the accession of Philip IV of Spain in 1621 Díaz Bessón was capellán at Granada Cathedral, then at Córdoba (1624–1631), and finally at the Convent of Las Descalzas Reales, Madrid. Dates overlap since he was concurrently maestro de la Real Capilla in Madrid and titular maestro de capilla of various cathedrals. In 1628 he was succeeded as maestro de capilla of the Royal Convent of La Encarnación in Madrid by Carlos Patiño who was then, five years later in 1634, chosen ahead of Díaz Bessón to succeed the Flemish-born Mateo Romero as the first Spanish-born maestro of the Flemish chapel (capilla flamenca). Díaz Bessón died four years later in Madrid.

Díaz Bessón "wrote music that was apostrophised as 'celestial'". Díaz Bessón composed in all the major genres: masses, requiem, motets, psalms, antiphons, hymns, tonos humanos, and villancicos. In all more than 700 compositions were recorded, almost all of which were lost in the 1755 Lisbon earthquake, as well as writing theoretical works.

== Recordings ==
- Sanctus and Benedictus, for Palm Sunday. on "Music for Holy Week at the Chapel of the Dukes of Braganza" A Capella Portuguesa. Owen Rees. Hyperion.
- Lauda Jerusalem (for brass ensemble) on "Music Of Gabrieli" Empire Brass dir. Carl St. Clair. Telarc
