= Miguel de Irízar =

Spanish composer

Miguel de Irízar y Domenzain (1635–1684) was a Spanish Baroque composer.

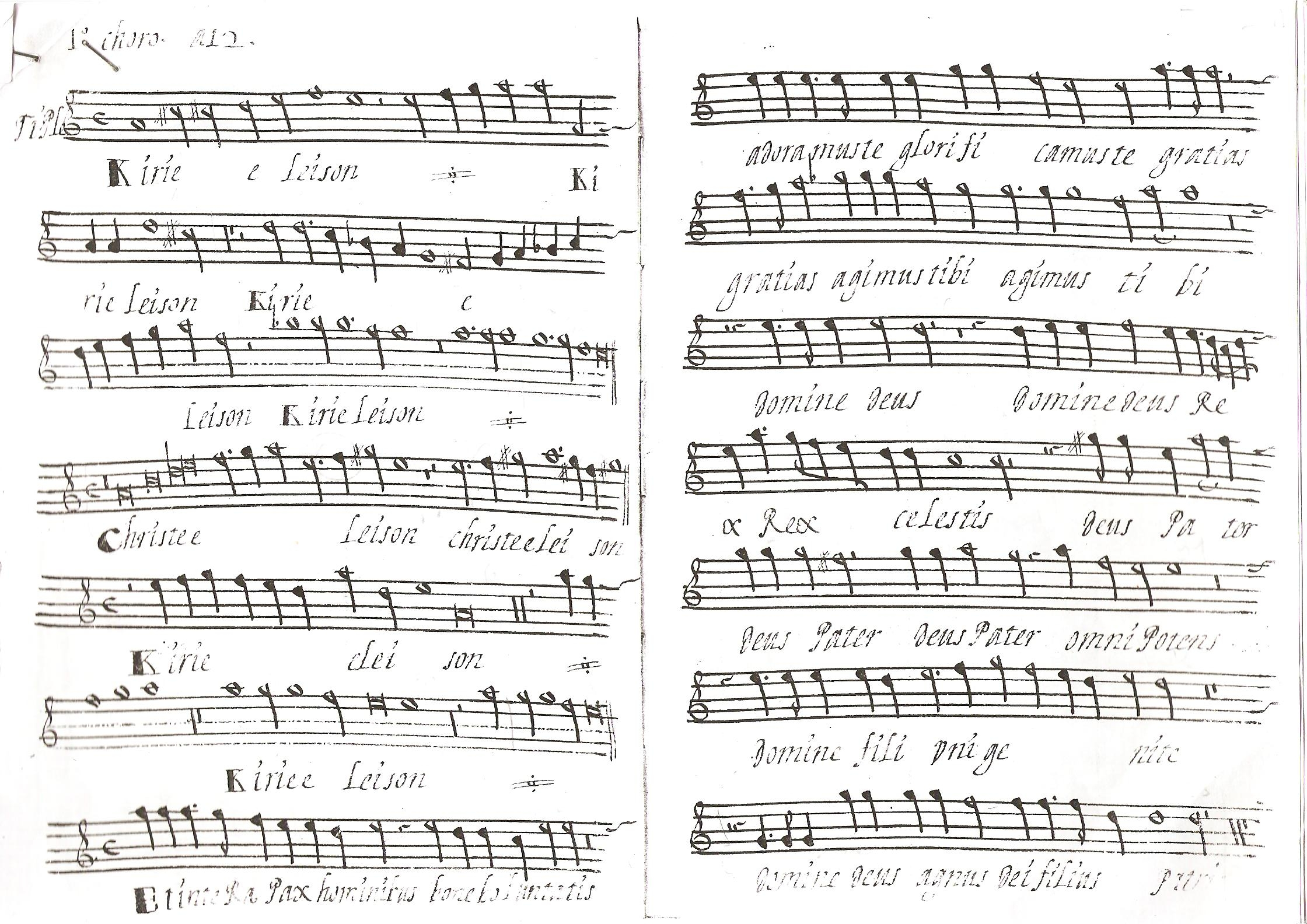
Parte de tiple de primer coro de la Misa de Lamentatione. Fuente: Catedral de Segovia

Irízar was born in Artajona and trained as a choirboy in León and Toledo. In August 1657 he became maestro de capilla in Vitoria, then in August 1671 appointed to Segovia Cathedral where he remained for his remaining thirteen years. He died at Segovia.

The correspondence of Irízar preserved in the cathedral of Segovia archives contains a total of 362 letters received during the period 1663 to 1684. There are numerous requests to Irízar to compose music for the chapels of other cathedrals, or to exchange for works by composers such as Cristóbal Galán and Carlos Patiño. Some of these compositions were part of the repertoire taken to the New World. The correspondence also includes extensive detail on performance practice. The letters indicate in particular the wide and rapid circulation of villancicos between different cathedrals.

== Works ==
- Masses
- Motets
- Lamentations
- Villancicos
- Tonos a la Navidad.

== Discography ==
- Miguel de Irízar. Mass for 6 voices. 10 Christmas pieces. Ecos y afectos. Capilla Jeronimo de Carrion, dir. Alicia Lazaro. Verso VRS2024, Spain 2004.
