= Nicolas Payen =

Franco-Flemish composer and choirmaster

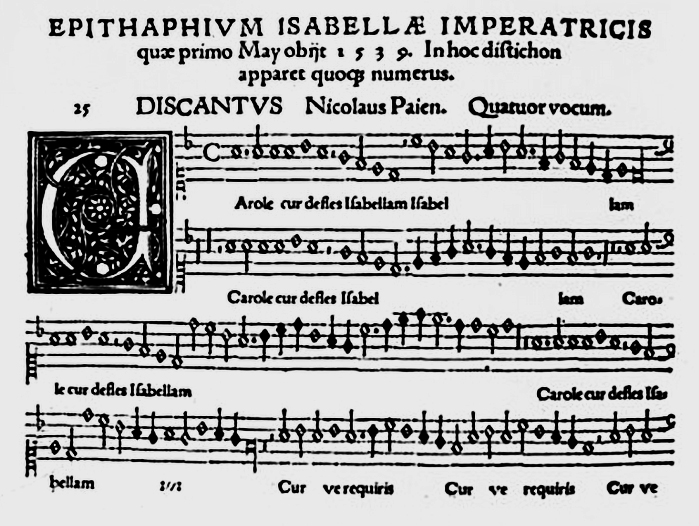
Carole cur defles Isabellam

Nicolas Payen (also Nicolas Colin) (c. 1512, in Soignies – after April 24, 1559) was a Franco-Flemish composer and choirmaster of the Renaissance, associated with the Grande Chapelle, the Habsburg imperial chapel, at the end of the reign of Charles V, Holy Roman Emperor.

== Life ==
Payen was born in Soignies, and received his earliest musical training in that town, in the church of St. Vincent. When he was about 13 years old he went to Spain to sing in the choir of Charles V; children were commonly recruited in the Low Countries for service in the imperial chapel. In the 1530s he may have attended university, but this portion of his life is poorly documented. In the 1540s he rose in the chapel hierarchy, becoming successively a clerk and a chaplain, and in 1556 he took over the post of maestro di capilla, the director of music, from Cornelius Canis who had retired the previous year simultaneously with the abdication of Charles V. Thus Payen became the first maestro di capilla for Habsburg monarch Philip II of Spain.

Payen acquired honors including prebends. In 1558 he became canon at the church in Tournai. He died in Madrid the next year or shortly after.

== Music and influence ==
Payen's music is both sacred and secular, and all surviving music is vocal, although some of his chansons were later arranged for lute. Thirteen motets and five chansons have survived with attribution to him. The motets include some written for state occasions, such as Carole cur defles, for the death of Queen Isabella, in 1545. One, In Gott gelaub ich das er hat, is in German. All are for four or five voices. His chansons are all for four voices, and all are in French.

His name appears in association with the controversial term musica reservata, a style of composition and performance beginning around the mid-16th century, which most likely involved intensely expressive setting of text, chromatic part-writing, and small audiences of connoisseurs. The Bavarian ambassador to the court of Charles V wrote a letter to his employer, Albrecht V, Duke of Bavaria, expressing what would happen when Payen would become maestro di capilla of the Flemish Chapel (capilla flamenca) for the Habsburg king: "musica reservata will become even more fashionable now than before, [after Nicolas Payen succeeds Cornelius Canis for the position], since Canis was not able to reconcile himself to it." Thus Payen was a composer in a progressive style to Canis's more conservative bent.

For further informations Laura Pollie Mc Dowell, "Nicolas Payen - Motets and chansons", A-R Edition, Middleton, 2006 ISBN 978-0-89579-593-9

=== Motets ===
- Virgo prudentissima
- Coenantibus illis
- Carole cur defles Isabellam
- Nunc dimittis
- Resurrectio Christi/Surrexit
- Qui dabit capiti
- Convertimini ad me
- Domine, deus salutis
- Confitemur delicta
- Nisi quia Dominus erat in nobis
- Benedictus Dominus Deus Israel
- Eripe me de inimicis meis Domine

=== Songs ===
- Fringotes jeusnes fillettes
- Hau de par Dieu
- Il y a de lognon
- Je ne me puis tenir
- Avecque vous mon amour finira
- Vien tost despiteux desconfort

=== Choir ===
- In Gott gelaub ich das er hat

== Recordings ==
- 3 motets and 6 chansons by Payen on Tota Vita – Music for Charles V. Egidius Kwartet. KTC1239. 2000.
