= Accentus (disambiguation) =

Accentus (or accentus ecclesiasticus) is a Church music term.

Accentus may also refer to:

- Accentus Austria, early music ensemble led by Thomas Wimmer
- Accentus (choir), a French cappella classical music choir directed by Laurence Equilbey
- Accentus (fallacy), a fallacy of ambiguity, where the ambiguity arises from the emphasis (accent) placed on a word or phrase
- Accentus Music, a German classical music record label
