= Thomas Wimmer =

Thomas Wimmer may refer to:

- Thomas Wimmer (politician) (1887–1964), mayor of Munich in the 1950s
- Thomas Wimmer (musician), Austrian viola-da-gamba player and conductor
