= Josquin Baston =

Dutch composer (born c. 1515)

Josquin Baston (c. 1515 – c. 1576) was a Dutch composer of the first half of the 16th century. From the 1550s, he worked as kapellmeister at the court of Christian III. After Christian III's death, he found work at a Swedish court. A number of his pieces were published in Sigismund Salblinger's Concentus (1545), and in the Leuven Collection (1554).

Charles Burney praises his compositions for their ease, rhythm, and melody, as well as for a distinct marking of the key in which they are to be played.

In 2021 lutenist Floris De Rycker and his ensemble "Ratas del viejo Mundo" recorded a CD entirely devoted to the chansons of Josquin Baston (Ramée RAM2103).
