= Matías Ruiz =

Matías Ruiz may refer to:

- Matías Ruiz (composer) (fl. 1665-1702), Spanish baroque composer
- Matías Ruiz Sosa (born 1992), Argentine football midfielder
- Matías Ruíz Díaz (born 1996), Argentine football rightback
