= Maria Alvarez =

Maria Alvarez may refer to:

- Maria Carla Alvarez (born 1984), Argentine cyclist
- María Álvarez de Guillén (1889–1980), Salvadoran businesswoman, writer and women's rights activist
- María Elisa Álvarez Obaya (1934–2010), Spanish pharmacist
- María Fernanda Álvarez Terán (born 1988), Bolivian tennis player
- Maria Helen Alvarez (1921–2009), American businesswoman
- María Nieves Álvarez Costa (born 1962), Spanish Paralympic athlete
- María-Luz Álvarez, Spanish singer
- María Álvarez (swimmer) (born 1989), Colombian swimmer
