= Géry de Ghersem =

Franco-Flemish composer

Géry de Ghersem (also Géry Gersem) (1573 to 1575 – 25 May 1630) was a Franco-Flemish composer of the late Renaissance, active both in Spain at the court of Philip II and Philip III, and in his native Low Countries. He was a prolific and highly regarded composer at the time, but little of his work survives, almost all having been destroyed in the Lisbon earthquake and fire of 1755.

== Life ==
Ghersem was born in Tournai, and received his boyhood musical training there, possibly under the direction of composer George de La Hèle. While still young, "between the ages of 7 and 12" according to the Habsburg chapel records, he was one of 14 boys brought to Spain to sing in the imperial chapel choir, the capilla flamenca. During this period, as during the previous two hundred years, the Low Countries provided a dependable source of talented young musicians for the choirs of kings and aristocrats in other parts of Europe. This practice was shortly to come to an end, as the last known group of choirboys from Flanders went to Spain in 1594.

After coming to Spain, Ghersem may have worked again with La Hèle briefly, since he directed the choir in Madrid, but La Hèle died in 1586. Ghersem rose in the ranks in the chapel, becoming cantor in 1593 and assistant director in 1598. In the 1590s he worked with prolific composer Philippe Rogier, who was then the director of the chapel choir; before Rogier died young in 1596 (he was 35) he had asked Ghersem to assist in publication of a group of masses he wrote; Ghersem added one of his own to this collection, which was fortunate, since that is the only work of Ghersem which survives complete.

In 1604, Ghersem left Spain and returned home, perhaps seeking a position as a music director, a position which was denied him in Madrid. In Brussels he found such employment in the chapel of Albert and Isabella, a position he kept for the rest of his career. He also became chaplain of the oratory, also in Brussels, and became a priest. During this time the court in Brussels was one of the leading artistic centers in Europe; this was the beginning of the "Golden Age" in the southern Netherlands. Some of his distinguished musical colleagues in Brussels in the early 17th century included Peter Phillips and John Bull. Ghersem died in Tournai, the place of his birth.

== Music and influence ==
Ghersem seems to have written most of his music in Spain, and he wrote quite a lot. The catalogue of the library of John IV of Portugal, which listed only about a third of the contents of that colossal collection, one of the largest libraries of the age, gives well over 200 works, all of which were destroyed in the Lisbon earthquake and fire of 1755. Ghersem's sacred vocal music included masses, motets, settings of the Lamentations, Magnificats, psalms, and 170 villancicos; he also wrote some secular music which John archived there, including chansons in French and a few songs in Spanish. Some of the villancicos were antiphonal compositions for Christmas, which had exchanges between voices and groups of instruments. Not enough is known of his music to determine if he adopted the Baroque style, the seconda pratica, for any of this work. Also no music for instruments only is known from the catalogue.

His solitary surviving complete work is a mass for seven voices, in the polyphonic style of the Renaissance. It makes use of canon, and is based on a motet by Francisco Guerrero.

Ghersem's music was loved by both Philips of Spain as well as John IV of Portugal, and Italian music theorist and writer Pietro Cerone praised him effusively in his massive and chaotic work El melopeo y maestro of 1613.

== Works, editions and recordings ==
Recordings

- Missa Ave Virgo Sanctissima, with motets by Francisco Guerrero, Pieter Cornet, Philippe Rogier, Peter Philips. Currende dir. Erik van Nevel. Accent 2011
