= Bernardo Murillo =

Spanish composer

Fray Bernardo Murillo (fl. 1620–1660) was a Spanish composer of tonos humanos and villancicos. The main body of work of friar Bernardo are 16 tonos humanos for 4 voices found in the Libro de Tonos Humanos in the Biblioteca Nacional de Madrid.

== Selected recordings ==
- Por Hacer Mudanzas Gila - on compilation The Flight of Icarus - Music for the Baroque Eros La Grande Chapelle
- !Sevilla a Voces Me Llama...! - on compilation The Great Seducer - Music for the myth of Don Juan La Grande Chapelle
