= Jean de Bonmarché =

Jean de Bonmarché (ca. 1525–September 1570) was a composer of the Franco-Flemish school.

Bonmarché was born in Douai. He became dean of Lille Cathedral, then in 1560 master of the choirboys at Old Cambrai Cathedral. On 30 November 1564, following the death of Pierre de Manchicourt, Margaret of Parma offered him the position of maestro de capilla of the Flemish chapel (capilla flamenca) in Spain. Bonmarché arrived in Madrid in June and served for five years. He died in Madrid and was succeeded by Geert van Turnhout.

Only one work by Bonmarché, Constitues eos principes a 8 voces, survives. A significant body of work from his time at Cambrai was lost.
