= Leiden choirbooks =

Leiden Choirbooks
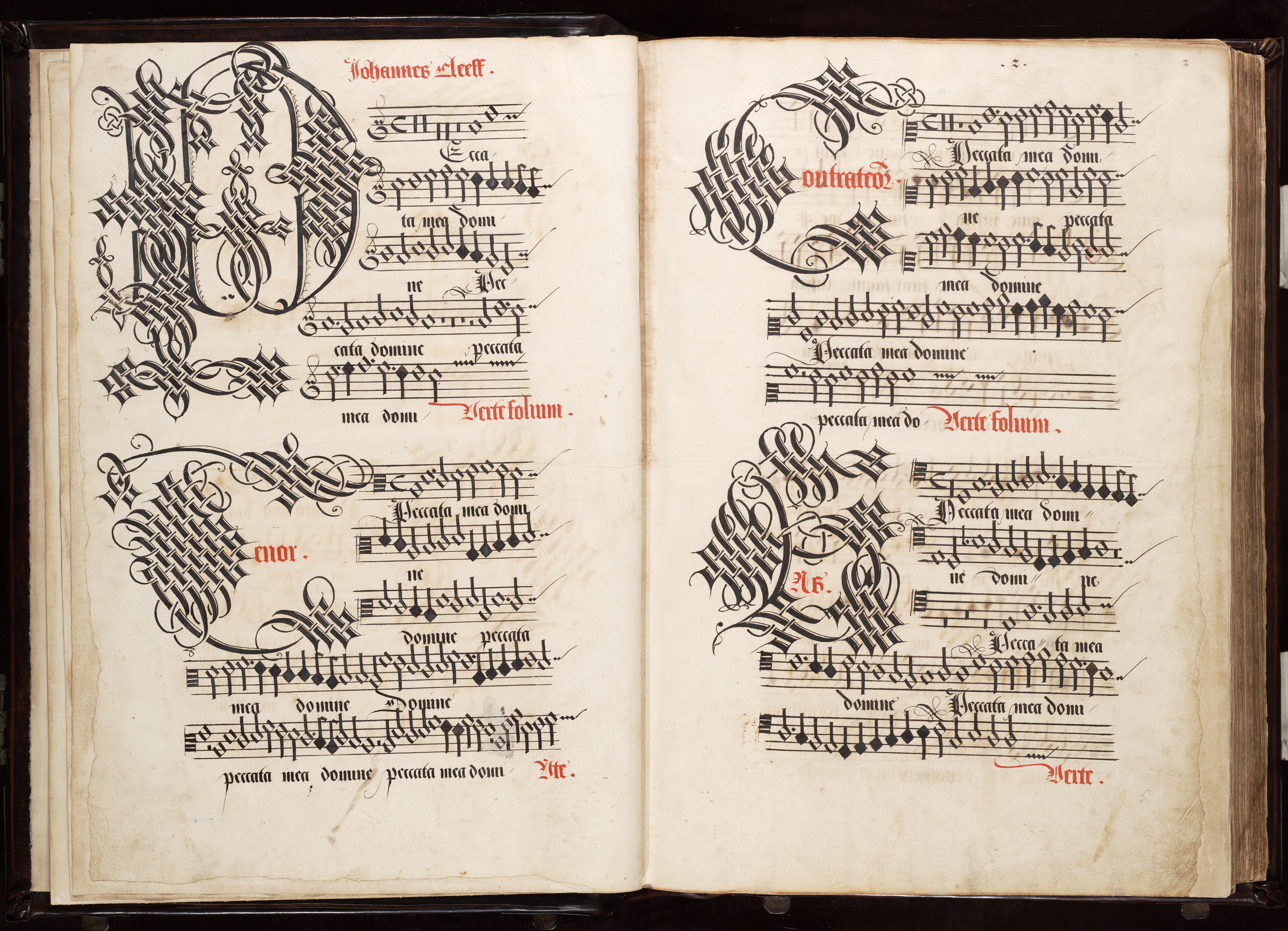
- Subject: Liturgy of the Hours
- Genre: Choirbook
- Published: 1549-1564
- Publication place: Low Countries

The Leiden choirbooks are six volumes of polyphonic renaissance music of the Franco-Flemish school copied for the Pieterskerk, Leiden and now preserved at the Erfgoed Leiden en Omstreken (formerly Gemeentearchief Leiden).

The books were compiled for the Pieterskerk's Zeven-Getijdencollege (College of the Seven Liturgical Hours), a professional choir employed at the Pieterskerk, as at many large Dutch parish churches during the 15th and 16th Centuries, to celebrate the officium divinum as well as masses for the dead - or rather those of the dead rich enough to have had left bequests and endowments for masses to be sung for them. Leiden was the first city to acquire a professional college for these services, c.1440. Rotterdam, Delft in both churches, Haarlem, Gouda, Alkmaar, and finally Amsterdam (as late as 1468) also set up dedicated "college" choirs.

The Liturgy of the Hours in major Dutch churches in the 15th Century was as follows:

- Matins
  - including Lauds (one combined service)
- Prime, early morning
- Terce, mid-morning
- Sext, midday
- None, mid-afternoon
- Vespers, evening service
- Compline, night service

Apart from the Leiden choirbooks almost no trace survives of the Seven Liturgical Hours repertoire. The Leiden books themselves survived the iconoclasm of 1566 when a mob burst into the Pieterskerk and ransacked it. Apparently, they were securely locked away and survived.

Apart from works by renowned masters such as Clemens non Papa, Crecquillon, Josquin des Prez, Johannes Lupi, and Jean Richafort, the books also include anonyma and compositions by less well-known Flemish and local composers, such as Claudin Patoulet, Joachimus de Monte, and Johannes Flamingus. A complete catalogue of the manuscripts and a detailed description of their history was published in 2018.

The Egidius Kwartet recorded major pieces from the 6 choirbooks in 6 annual 2CD releases from 2010 to 2015.
