= Juan del Vado =

Spanish composer (1625–1691)

Juan del Vado y Gomez (1625–1691) was a Spanish composer, organist and violinist. He is noted for the enigmatic canons, symbolic musical puzzles, dedicated to his king Charles II of Spain.

He came from a family of violinists. His father was a player of violin, lute and shawm in the Capilla Real of Madrid.

== Works, editions and recordings ==
- Keyboard works - including four keyboard pieces preserved in P.Pm Ms 1577 Loe.
- Enigmatic canons
- tonos humanos in the Guerra Manuscript and other sources.
- Free scores by Juan del Vado in the Choral Public Domain Library (ChoralWiki)
