= Jan van Turnhout =

Jan van Turnhout (c. 1545 – 1614 or 1618) was a composer of the Franco-Flemish School.

== Life and work ==
Jan Jacob van Turnhout was possibly the brother of Geert van Turnhout. In 1577 he was appointed Kapellmeister at St Rumbold's Cathedral in Mechelen. Around 1586 he got a similar position (maître de chapelle) with Alexander Farnese in Brussels, which he would keep until his death.

He published Il primo libro de madrigali en Sacrarum cantionum. Two madrigals and a four-part song by him on Dutch texts are also known from other sources. The latter (Gij meijskens die vander comenscap sijt) was published in 1572 by the Antwerp printer Petrus Phalesius in his anthology of Dutch songs, the Duijtsch musijck boeck.
