= Ángel Recasens =

Ángel Recasens (4 March 1938 in Cambrils – 2 August 2007) was a Catalan organist, teacher, composer and musicologist best known as a choral conductor.

From 1975 to 1986, he was director of the Coro de Sant Esteve of Vila-seca. There, he performed music from the romantics Schumann and Mendelssohn, to the contemporary music of Ligeti and Schnittke. He also directed the Coral Verge del Camí in his home town Cambrils.

In his later years, he dedicated himself to reviving lost Spanish choral works from the 16th to 18th centuries; first with la Capilla Príncipe de Viana, then with the expanded La Grande Chapelle and his own label Lauda Records. Both the ensemble and the label were continued by his son Albert Recasens.
