= Tonada =

Form of folk music in Spain and Latin America

The tonada is a folk music style of Spain and some countries of Hispanic America (mainly Argentina, Chile, Peru, Bolivia and Venezuela). In modern-day Spain, the traditional piece known as tonada is considered as having been originated in Asturias and Cantabria. Although tonada (from "tone") is a Spanish word which can mean anything sung, played or danced, musicological usage in Spanish and English is more specific.

== Baroque Peru ==
The baroque tonada is distinct from the tono humano or tonado, secular song, a main genre of 17th-century Spanish and Portuguese music. Examples of the baroque tonada are found in the Codex Martínez Compañón.

== Argentina ==
The Argentine form of the tonada originates from Cuyo Region and is usually played by guitar group.

== Chile ==
The modern rural Chilean folk tonada is typically a simple "monotonous" slow-moving song with a melancholy theme.

== Venezuela ==
In Venezuela the tonada tend to be presented as work songs that accompany various tasks such as milking, farming, herding, hunting, fishing, threshing, grinding corn, harvesting and rest of rural man. These songs, in addition to constituting a labor rite, symbolize the spirit of coexistence among those who perform common tasks.

According to the Venezuelan musician, composer and musicologist Luis Felipe Ramón y Rivera, the tonadas are utilitarian songs that are characterized by their monodic system, in which harmony is clearly established by long notes of six, eight or more moderate times. that enclose the cadences.

These songs are measurable and interspersed cries and jipíos according to the need of the work, depending on the milking or the drive. As for the scales to which these melodies are adjusted, they vary among themselves, according to the type of regional music. Thus, a song of the Táchira state to harvest coffee differs a lot from a llanero ridge for the drive. But, in general, all show an old character.

The deceased Venezuelan singer-songwriter and musician Simón Díaz was the greatest exponent of this genre, who rescued and made known during his recording career.
