= Marbrianus de Orto =

Franco-Flemish composer

Marbrianus de Orto (Dujardin; also Marbriano, Marbrianus; c. 1460 – January or February 1529) was a Flemish composer of the Renaissance (Franco-Flemish school). He was a contemporary, close associate, and possible friend of Josquin des Prez, and was one of the first composers to write a completely canonic setting of the Ordinary of the Mass.

== Life ==
The illegitimate child of a priest, Orto was probably born in Tournai, and spent the early part of his life there. While his original surname was Dujardin, he used "de Orto" (the Italian translation of Dujardin) throughout his life. In June 1482, in the household of Ferry de Clugny, Cardinal-Bishop of Tournai (who died 7 October 1483), he went to Rome, where he became a singer in the papal chapel; he may have become an accomplished composer around this time, since his Missa ad fugam seems to have been written in response to the similar composition by Josquin des Prez, tentatively dated to the early 1480s, and Orto's mass was copied for the Capella Sistina between 1487 and 1490.

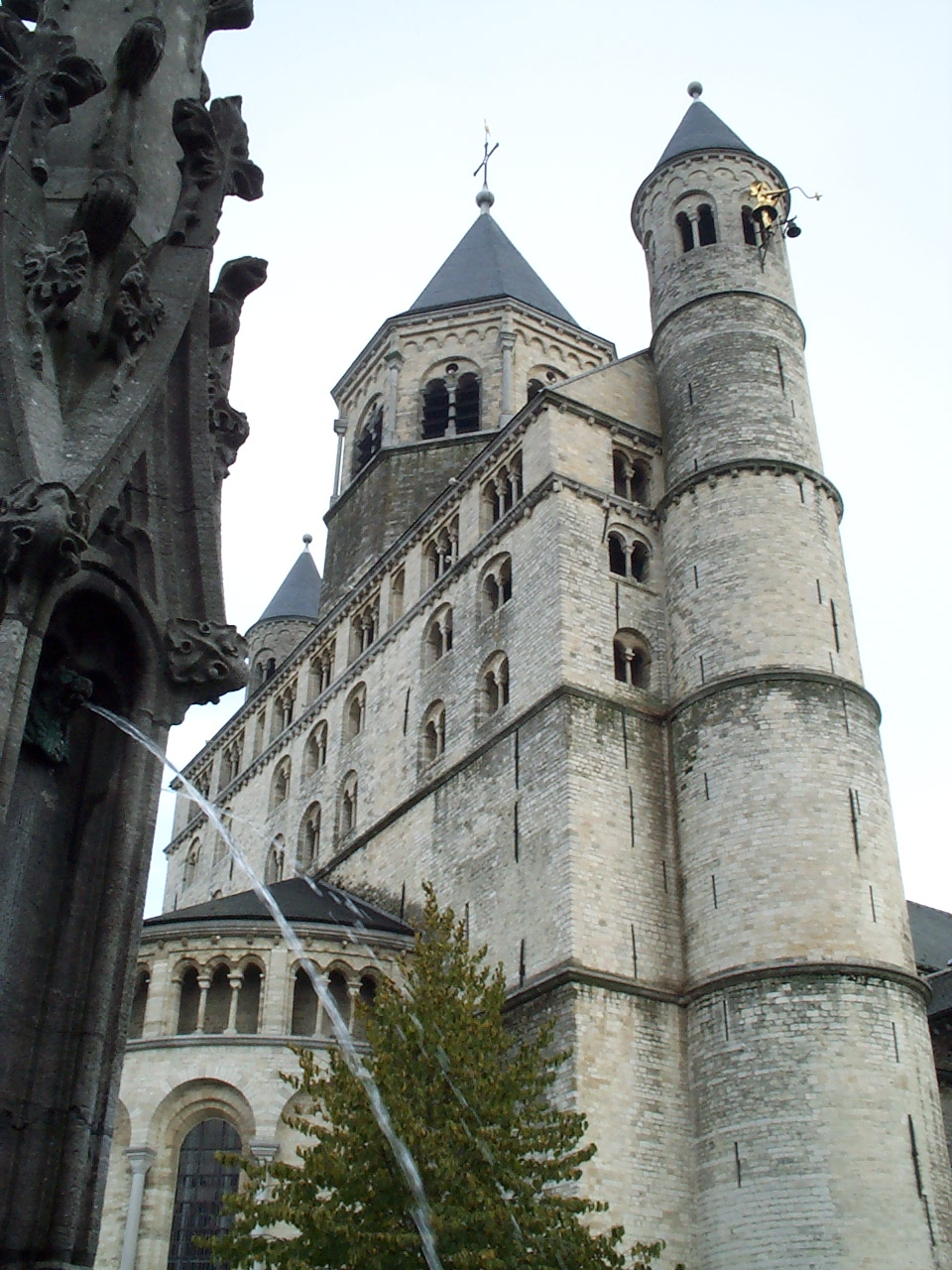
The Church of St. Gertrude in Nivelles, where Orto worked from the mid 1490s until his death in 1529, and where he is buried.

While he served in the Sistine Chapel Choir until at least 1499, during the papacies of Innocent VIII and Alexander VI, he began to acquire other posts and benefices. He was particularly popular with Innocent, who awarded him benefices and allowed him to rise in the hierarchy in spite of his illegitimacy. During this time he and Josquin worked closely together, even seeking similar positions at Cambrai in their mutual homeland. One of the things he may have done in collaboration with Josquin was a revision of a cycle of hymns by Guillaume Dufay, composed around 1430, which had fallen out of use. At some time in the early 1490s Orto acquired the post of dean at the Collegiate Church of St. Gertrude of Nivelles, present-day Belgium; he was to remain closely associated with this institution for the rest of his life. It is not known exactly when he moved there, but he left Nivelles in late 1504 in order to join the choir of Philip the Handsome, la Grande Chapelle, a distinguished musical body which included Pierre de La Rue, and which went to Spain in 1506.

Orto joined the choir at a very high level, becoming premier chapelain in short order—by 30 November 1505—indicating the high level of respect as both composer and singer he had attained. After Philip's death in September 1506 the choir was kept on by Juana of Castile, "Juana the Mad", and Orto was one of the singers who left shortly after, between October and December 1506, leaving the duties of premier chapelain to Pierre de La Rue. During this time and for the next three years Juana traveled with her singers, each night singing a requiem to her husband's corpse which went with them in its coffin, in a bizarre journey through Castile until Juana's father Ferdinand finally imprisoned her in the fortress at Tordesillas.

Back in the Low Countries, Orto remained in the employ of the Habsburgs, from at least 1509 until 1517, during which time he shared the duties of premier chapelain with Anthoine de Berghes. Sometime during this period he was likely the teacher of Arnold von Bruck, who was a choirboy. No certain documentation of Orto's activities during 1507 and 1508 is known.

In the later years of his life he acquired additional posts, as canon both at the Antwerp Church of Our Lady and at Ste Gudule in Brussels, and a record from 1518 lists him as the "first chaplain" in the Flemish chapel (capilla flamenca) of Charles V. He possibly died of the plague which swept through Nivelles in 1529, and was buried in the church of Ste Gertrude, where he worked for the longest time. His tomb in the choir had an inscription which remained legible until the church was destroyed by the Germans on 14 May 1940, during the Second World War.

== Music and influence ==
Marbrianus de Orto was a moderately prolific composer of masses, motets, lamentations, and chansons, many of which have survived. He was famous enough that Ottaviano Petrucci published a book of his masses in 1505—one of his earliest publications, and one of the earliest collections of printed music. De Orto's book of masses followed after those by Josquin, Jacob Obrecht, Antoine Brumel, Johannes Ghiselin, Pierre de La Rue, and Alexander Agricola.

Petrucci published five of de Orto's masses in this collection. All are cantus firmus masses, and include a mass based on the popular L'homme armé secular song, which was probably composed in the early to mid 1480s.

Among his masses is the unusual Missa [Ad fugam], one of only a handful of freely composed canonic masses from the period, including Johannes Ockeghem's Missa prolationum, based entirely on mensuration canons. De Orto's Missa [Ad fugam] may be related another canonic mass in a Vatican manuscript, later named "Missa ad fugam" and attributed to Josquin by Petrucci. Both masses use strict canon at the fifth between superius and tenor, as well as a head motive in most movements. The same title was used to describe the canonic "Missa Sine nomine" in a later print by Antico.

De Orto's motets also usually use cantus firmus technique. The Salve regis mater sanctissima, though anonymous in its only surviving source, is probably by de Orto and was composed for the accession of Alexander VI in 1492.

Some of the chansons are akin to the typical French style of the early 16th century—quick, light, and imitative; others are more in line with the Burgundian style of the formes fixes. De Orto also wrote an early setting of Dido's lament, Dulces exuviae, from the Aeneid (iv.651–4), containing extensive chromatic writing.

== References and further reading ==
- Picker, Martin. L. Macy (ed.). Marbrianus de Orto. Grove Music Online. Archived from the original on 13 January 2011.(subscription required)
- Fallows, David. L. Macy (ed.). L'homme armé. Grove Music Online. Archived from the original on 13 January 2011.(subscription required)
- Sherr, Richard, ed. The Josquin Companion. Oxford: Oxford Univ. Press, 2000. ISBN 0-19-816335-5.
- Meconi, Honey. Pierre de la Rue and Musical Life at the Habsburg-Burgundian Court. Oxford: Oxford University Press, 2003. ISBN 0-19-816554-4
- Rodin, Jesse. "Josquin and the Polyphonic Mass in the Sistine Chapel." PhD diss., Harvard Univ., 2007.
- Davison, Nigel St. J. "Mabriano de Orto, Latin Compositions I Missa Ad Fugam Antico Edition RCM43"
- Davison, Nigel St. J. "Mabriano de Orto, Latin Compositions II Missa DominicalisAntico Edition RCM44"
