= Juan de Lima Serqueira =

Spanish Baroque composer

Juan de Lima Serqueira (c. 1655-1726) was a Spanish Baroque composer of tonos humanos.
