= Pierre de Manchicourt =

French renaissance composer

Pierre de Manchicourt (c. 1510 – 5 October 1564) was a Renaissance composer of the Franco-Flemish School.

De Manchicourt was born at Béthune. Little is known of his early life other than that he was a choirboy at Arras in 1525. Further biographical information is scant, however the title-pages of his publications reveal that between 1539 and 1556 he held a succession of posts in Arras, Tours and Tournai, before going to Spain to be master of the Flemish chapel (capilla flamenca) at the court of Philip II, where he stayed for the remainder of his life.

Similar to many composers of the early to mid 16th century, he predominantly wrote masses, motets and chansons. His motets are particularly significant as they show the three separate stages of early sixteenth century motet development, highly unusual to find in the work of a single composer. In his earliest motets one can hear the influence of Ockeghem; in his middle period works, the paired imitation style of Josquin des Prez; and in his late works the stylistic refinement, well-crafted melodic lines and pervasive imitation recall Gombert.

Manchicourt is an example of a Franco-Flemish composer who learned his craft and art in northern Europe, and then assisted in the diffusion of the style by traveling to another region and composing and performing there. The movement of these many skilled composers out of Flanders and northern France created what was one of the first truly international styles since the original diffusion of Gregorian chant during the reign of Charlemagne.

He died in Madrid and was succeeded as maestro de capilla by Jean de Bonmarché.

== Recordings ==
- Manchicourt, Missa Cuidez vous que Dieu (The Brabant Ensemble, Stephen Rice (conductor)) on Hyperion CDA67604
- Manchicourt, Missa Veni Sancte Spiritus, Motets, Chansons (Huelgas Ensemble, Paul Van Nevel) on Sony Classical SK 62694
- Manchicourt, Missa Reges terrae and Motets (The Choir of St. Luke in the Fields, David Shuler (director)) on MSR Classics MS 1632
- Manchicourt, Missa de Requiem and 4 Motets (The Choir of The Church of the Advent, Boston, Edith Ho (director)) on Arsis SACD 406
- Manchicourt, Missa Non conturbantur cor vestrum and 5 Motets (The Choir of the Church of the Advent, Boston, Edith Ho (director) on Arsis SACD 400.
- Manchicourt, Missa Quo abiit dilectus tuus (Les Chanteurs De Saint-Eustache, R.P. Emile Martin (director)) on BAM Records (Éditions De La Boîte À Musique) LD 022
- Manchicourt, Missa Nisi Dominus (Egidius Kwartet & College) on Etcetera KTC 1415
- Manchicourt, Masses (Beauty Farm) on Fra Bernardo 241 9456

== References and further reading ==
- "Pierre de Manchicourt", in The New Grove Dictionary of Music and Musicians, ed. Stanley Sadie. 20 vol. London, Macmillan Publishers Ltd., 1980. ISBN 1-56159-174-2
- Gustave Reese, Music in the Renaissance. New York, W.W. Norton & Co., 1954. ISBN 0-393-09530-4
