= Matías Ruiz (composer) =

Spanish composer

Fray Matías Ruiz (fl. 1665-1702) was a Spanish baroque composer. He was probably the one same Matías Ruiz who was maestro de capilla at León Cathedral in 1665, and then at the Encarnación 1676-1678, and who, still referred to as maestro at the Convent of the Incarnation, Madrid though he no longer could have been, published music for Easter in 1702.

== Works, editions and recordings ==
- villancicos - En la carcel de Belen and others.
- tonos humanos in the Guerra Manuscript and other sources.
- Crowd scene and choruses for Passions. «Turba de la Passion, de la Dominica in Palmis, puesta en musica por Don Matias Ruiz, Maestro de Capilla del Real Convento de las Senoras de la Encarnacion. Ano 1702».
