= Missa ad fugam =

1515 musical setting by Josquin des Prez

The Missa ad fugam is a musical setting of the Ordinary of the Mass by the composer Josquin des Prez, dating from the early 16th century.

== Overview ==
Although Josquin's two canonic masses were published together in Ottaviano Petrucci's third book of the composer's masses in 1514, The Missa ad fugam is clearly the earlier of the two. It has a head-motif consisting of the entirety of the first Kyrie which is literally repeated in the beginning of all five movements. The canon is also restricted to the highest voice, and the pitch interval between the voices is fixed while the temporal interval varies between one and three breves depending on the mensuration. The two free voices generally do not participate in the imitation. Hallmark techniques of Josquin's mature style are only sporadically present, and even the melodic construction occasionally displays a certain awkwardness.

Uniquely for Josquin, the Missa ad fugam seems to have undergone revision, possibly at the hands of the composer himself. One late manuscript transmits the mass with minor modifications to the Kyrie and Gloria, and also entirely rewritten Sanctus and Agnus Dei. These rewritten sections are both more concise and integrated, as the unwieldy head-motif is shortened and there is greater concentration of motif. In short, the revisions seem to reflect a mature composer reworking a youthful work.

It is generally agreed that Josquin's Missa ad fugam is closely related to the Missa ad fugam of Marbrianus de Orto. Both masses consistently explore canon at the lower fifth between the superius and tenor, and both masses share the one flat G-final modality. The direction of influence is debated, since de Orto's mass is more advanced and predates Josquin's mass, it is somewhat incongruous with Josquin's reputation. This has led to questions about the authorship of Josquin's mass, although it is accepted by the New Josquin Edition.; Jesse Rodin and Joshua Rifkin considers it spurious, while its authenticity is strongly defended by Peter Urquhart.
