= Matías Juan de Veana =

Spanish composer

Matías Juan de Veana (Xàtiva, c. 1656 – after 1708) was a Spanish composer. He was chapelmaster both at the Real Monasterio de la Encarnación and at the Monasterio de las Descalzas Reales in Madrid, and became known for his villancicos.

== Links ==
- Free scores by Matías Juan de Veana in the Choral Public Domain Library (ChoralWiki)
- Free scores by Matías Juan de Veana at the International Music Score Library Project (IMSLP)
