= Joop Voorn =

Dutch composer (1932–2021)

Joop Voorn ( 16 October 1932, in The Hague – 11 July 2021, in Tilburg) was a Dutch composer.

== Biography ==
Joop Voorn sang in the parish boys' choir "Ex ore infantium": Gregorian chant, Perosi, but also Palestrina, Bruckner and Jan Mul. He took piano lessons and studied piano, organ and harmony from 1946 to 1951 with Jean Claessens in Weert. From 1952 to 1966 he studied philosophy and theology, including in Rome, where he also took counterpoint lessons with Edgardo Carducci at the Istituto Pontificio di Musica Sacra. He also worked as a lecturer in theology. In 1966 he did a master's degree in dogmatic theology in Nijmegen with Edward Schillebeeckx, cum laude, with a thesis on "Law and Gospel" in Helmut Thielicke's Theological Ethik I. From 1966 he studied at the Brabant Conservatory in Tilburg: composition and theory with Jan van Dijk, and piano with Polo de Haas. In 1969 he obtained a diploma in the theory of music. His thesis dealt with the twelve-tone structure of Stravinsky's Threni. In 1971 he obtained a diploma in piano and in 1975 the conservatory prize for composition. In 1969 Joop Voorn became a teacher of music analysis and counterpoint at the Brabant Conservatory. He held this position until 1995, when finally subjects such as music history and 20th century analysis were discussed. In the 1990s, Joop Voorn studied painting at the Academy of Fine Arts in Arendonk, Belgium. He graduated in 1998 with honorable mention, both for his work and for his thesis entitled: Heeft de vorm een inhoud?

== Works ==
- A Cantata for St. Michael's Day for Alto Solo, Choir and Brass Ensemble
- Als de ziele luistert for Chamber Choir
- Lofsang van Braband for Chamber Choir
- Responsories voor de Advent for Mixed Choir and Brass Ensemble
- Sonata for Alto Saxophone and Piano
- Speaking of Siva for Chorus and Orchestra.
