= Mateo Romero (composer) =

Belgian-born Spanish composer

Mateo Romero (ca. 1575 – 1647) was a Belgian-born Spanish composer of Baroque music and master of the royal chapel.

== Biography ==
Romero was born as Mathieu Rosmarin in Liège, Belgium, and, following the early death of his father was, like many children from the then-Spanish Netherlands, recruited as a child to serve as a choir boy at the Madrid court. Between 1586 and 1593 he was taught in Spain by his countrymen George de la Hèle and Philippe Rogier. He took the name Romero in 1594. In 1598 he was maestro de capilla at the Spanish court of Philip II of Spain and Philip III of Spain. He remained in this position till 1634. In 1609 he was ordained a priest and was private chaplain to Philipp III. He was also secretary of the Order of the Golden Fleece.

After the death of Philip, he was also chaplain to King John IV of Portugal.

Romero was one of the most appreciated composers of his time; he was known as "El Maestro Capitan". His service extended over the threshold of two musical eras, the Renaissance and Baroque. Although he was not part of the polyphonic school of the great Franco-Flemish school, he played an important role in the introduction of Italian stile moderno in Spain.

== Works ==
Most of his works, which were stored in the Royal Library in Lisbon, were destroyed in the Lisbon earthquake of 1755.

Surviving works include:

Masses:

- Missa Bonae voluntatis 9 voices and B.c. (also 5 voice version)
- Missa Qui Habitat (8 voices and B.c.) - based on his own Psalm.
- Missa Un jour l'amant (8 voices and B.c.) - parody mass of chanson of Lassus.
- Missa Dolce fiamella (5 voices and B.c.)
- Missa Batalla (4 voices and B.c.)
- Missa de Requiem de dos Baxos (8 voices and B.c.) Missa "Pro Defunctis"
- Missa Veu que de vostre amour a 8
- Missa Dolce fiamella mia a 5 - on madrigal by Giovanni Maria Nanino.
- Missa on the Litany, 5vv (on his own 8 voice Litany
- Missa Batalla a 4 - on Clement Janequin's La Bataille
- Missa Sabbato Sancto a 4

Magnificats, Psalms and Motets:

- 3 Magnificat
- 3 Dixit Dominus
- Domine, quando veneris
- Libera me, Domine
- Convertere Domine
- Domine, ne in furore tuo

Secular works:

- 9 villancicos
- 3 canciones a 3
- 5 letrillas a 3
- 2 novenas a 2
- 2 folías
- 15 romances a 3 to texts by Lope de Vega, Francisco de Quevedo and others.
- 1 seguidilla
- 11 songs (treble voice surviving only) in Cancionero de Onteniente, 1645.

== Discography ==
- "Romero - Music At The Spanish Court" Currende, dir. Erik Van Nevel, 1996 (Cypres 3606)
- "Missa pro defunctis - Requiem para Cervantes" Ensemble Schola Antiqua, La Grande Chapelle, dir. Ángel Recasens (Communidad)
- "Office Pour l'Ordre de la Toison d'Or" Choeur de Chambre de Namur, dir. Jean Tubéry. 2003 (Ricercar)
