= Peeter Cornet =

Flemish composer

Peeter Cornet (Pierre, Pietro, Peter, Pieter) (ca. 1570-80 – 27 March 1633) was a Flemish composer and organist of the early Baroque period. Although few of his compositions survive, he is widely considered one of the best keyboard composers of the early 17th century.

== Life ==
Very little is known about Cornet's life. Much of the information comes from a letter by his widow. Cornet was born in the 1570s in the Brussels, then the capital of the Southern Netherlands. The family included numerous musicians, among them a violinist, singers and organists. From 1603 to 1606 Cornet worked as organist at the Church of St. Nicholas in Brussels. Around 1606 he became court organist to Albert VII, Archduke of Austria and his wife Infanta Isabella Clara Eugenia of Spain, the governors of the Southern Netherlands who maintained their court in Brussels. For one month, in March 1611, Cornet was a canon at Soignies, but he gave up his canonry to marry.

Cornet is listed as chapel organist in the surviving court account books from 1612 to 1618. His colleagues included important English composers Peter Philips (who acted as godfather to one of Cornet's children) and John Bull, as well as fellow Flemish composers Géry Ghersem and Matthijs Langhedul. Apparently Cornet was also active as an organ consultant and builder. In 1615 he provided advice concerning the organ of St. Rumbolds Cathedral (Sint-Romboutskathedraal) in Mechelen, and in 1624 he signed a contract to build a choir division for the same organ.

== Works ==
Cornet's surviving output is small and consists only of keyboard music: eight fantasias, two courantes (with variations), a toccata, a setting of Salve Regina, and one of Tantum Ergo. One of the fantasias, Fantasia del 5. tuono sopra ut re mi fa sol la, survives incomplete. The style varies from animated, bright music of the courantes, to elaborate polyphony in the fantasias and the mystical, religious feeling of the Salve Regina setting.

The fantasias use the Italian ricercare structure, with its imitative treatment of the subjects in several sections. However, Cornet prefers to use a large number of subjects (up to six) or relies on a double subject (a subject the two halves of which can be used as separate subjects); consequently, most of the fantasias are rather large works. The style shows the influence of English virginal music, with unexpected fast runs and characteristic figurations (in some fantasias ornaments are even notated using the English symbol: two oblique bars), with the exception of wide skips, broken octaves, and other virtuosic figures such as those found in Bull's and Farnaby's music. A characteristic feature is Cornet's use of rhythmic changes. In sharp contrast to his famed contemporary Sweelinck, who developed a pedantic, systematic approach to applying changes such as augmentation or diminution to the subject, Cornet prefers to only use the techniques where they seem appropriate, and avoids schematic treatment. An augmented version of a subject, for instance, will not simply double all the note values, but rather double some, triple another, leave another intact, etc. The presentation of the subject is almost always varied.

The settings of Salve Regina and Tantum Ergo exhibit similar characteristics. The former comprises five sections (Salve, Ad te clamamus, Eia ergo, O clemens, Pro fine). The first three are fugues on the initial motifs of the corresponding lines, the fourth is a cantus firmus setting with the melody first stated in the soprano and then in the tenor, and the fifth combines the subject and its inversion. As in the fantasias, figural elements are seamlessly woven into the polyphonic fabric.

Cornet's courantes are both modelled on English examples. One is followed by three variations of the entire piece. The only surviving toccata by Cornet consists entirely of various figurations, including among them the then fashionable echo effect, frequently used by Sweelinck but only encountered in this single instance in Cornet's oeuvre.

== Editions ==
- Pieter Cornet: Collected Keyboard Works, in Corpus of Early Keyboard Music XXVI, ed. W. Apel (1969).
- Peeter Cornet: Complete Keyboard Music. Monumenta Musica Neerlandica vol. XVII, Koninklijke Vereniging voor Nederlandse Muziekgeschiedenis, ed. Pieter Dirksen & Jean Ferrard (Utrecht 2001, 2/2016). ISBN 90-6375-181-8

== References and further reading ==
- Mary Armstrong Ferrard. Peeter Cornet (?–1633), organiste à la cour d'Albert et Isabelle à Bruxelles (Brussels, 1973)
- Willi Apel. The History of Keyboard Music to 1700, pp. 338–344. Translated by Hans Tischler. Indiana University Press, 1972. ISBN 0-253-21141-7. Originally published as Geschichte der Orgel- und Klaviermusik bis 1700 by Bärenreiter-Verlag, Kassel.
- Ferrard, Mary Armstrong (2001). "Peeter Cornet". In Sadie, Stanley; Tyrrell, John (eds.). The New Grove Dictionary of Music and Musicians (2nd ed.). London: Macmillan Publishers. ISBN 978-1-56159-239-5.
