= George de La Hèle =

Franco-Flemish composer

George de La Hèle (also Georges, Helle, Hele) (1547 – August 27, 1586) was a Franco-Flemish composer of the Renaissance, mainly active in the Habsburg chapels of Spain and the Low Countries. Among his surviving music is a book of eight masses, some for as many as eight voices. While he was a prolific composer during his time in Spain, much of his music was destroyed in 1734 in the burning of the chapel library in Madrid.

== Life ==
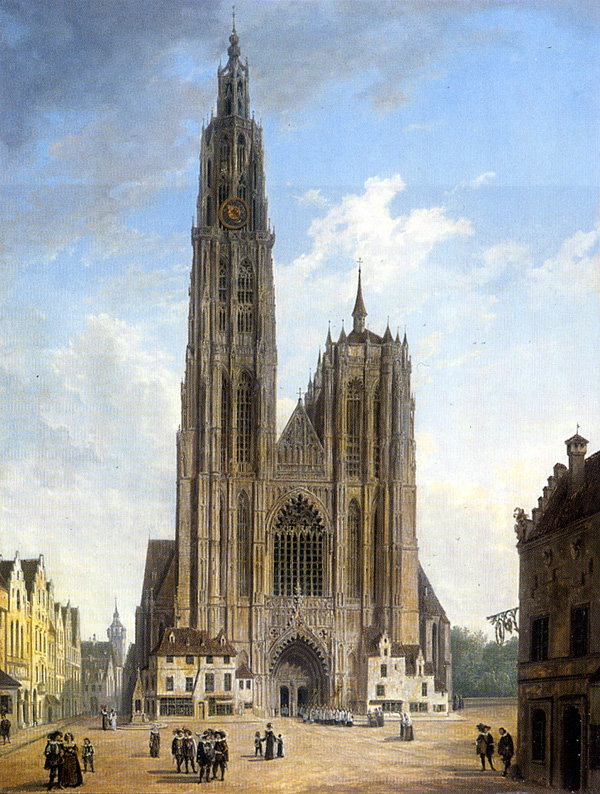
La Hèle was educated at the Cathedral of Our Lady, Antwerp

La Hèle was born in Antwerp, and received his musical training both there and possibly at Soignies. He spent his teenage years as a choirboy in Madrid, in the chapel of Philip II, then led by Pierre de Manchicourt, another northern composer who spent much of his career in Spain; Manchicourt probably identified the young La Hèle himself on one of his talent-scouting trips to his own homeland. After singing as a choirboy for several years, in the late 1560s La Hèle went to study at the University of Alcalá, and in 1570 returned north, enrolling at the University of Leuven. While his course of study has not been documented, it is presumed he studied not music but theology. He seems not to have achieved the priesthood, but rose high enough in the Church hierarchy to be eligible for benefices.

In the 1570s La Hèle stayed in the Low Countries, working successively as choirmaster at the cathedrals in Mechelen and Tournai, both centers of music-making. These were also productive years: he wrote the eight masses which Antwerp printer Christopher Plantin published in 1578 as Octo missae, La Hèle's most famous (and principal surviving) publication.

In 1580 La Hèle became maestro di capilla of Philip's royal chapel, and by the next year he had gone to Madrid to take the post, as maestro of the capilla flamenca to distinguish from the capilla real. His career there was also successful, with acclaimed performances; he also added considerably to the chapel's repertory, bringing in music by northern composers such as Clemens non Papa, Italians such as Palestrina, and music by native Spaniards such as Francisco Guerrero and Cristóbal de Morales.

Shortly before his death, he married, thereby giving up his considerable benefices. The marriage may have occurred during his final illness, and he mentioned only his wife, Madelena Guabaelaraoen, in his will. He died in Madrid; the cause is not recorded, but he was only 38 or 39.

== Music and influence ==
La Hèle's masses, his most considerable surviving compositions, all use the parody technique, and each announces the polyphonic model on which they are based in the table of contents of the book. The models include works by Josquin, Cipriano de Rore, Thomas Crecquillon, and Lassus. All of the sources are motets; unlike many composers of parody masses, he avoided secular songs as sources.

La Hèle was evidently highly regarded, certainly by Philip II, and the publication of his masses was an unusually opulent one – but Plantin's business sense was sufficient to require La Hèle himself to buy forty copies of his own book to help with the cost of printing (although at a discount: 16 florins instead of the usual price of 18). The work sold better than expected, and as a result many copies of this particular publication survive. Most of La Hèle's other music existed in manuscript copies kept in the library of the Palacio Real, but when the entire complex was destroyed by fire on Christmas Eve, 1734, it was all lost. Some of the lost music is known from an inventory of 1585, and includes motets, Passion settings, mass sections, and Lamentations.

His entire surviving output – ten compositions – has been published in series 56 of Corpus mensurabilis musicae (two volumes).

== Recordings ==
Missa Praeter rerum seriem, 1578: Kyrie, Sanctus and Agnus Dei in 2017 album Vecchi Requiem Rubens's funeral and the Antwerp Baroque by Graindelavoix under the direction of Björn Schmelzer.
