= Egidius Kwartet =

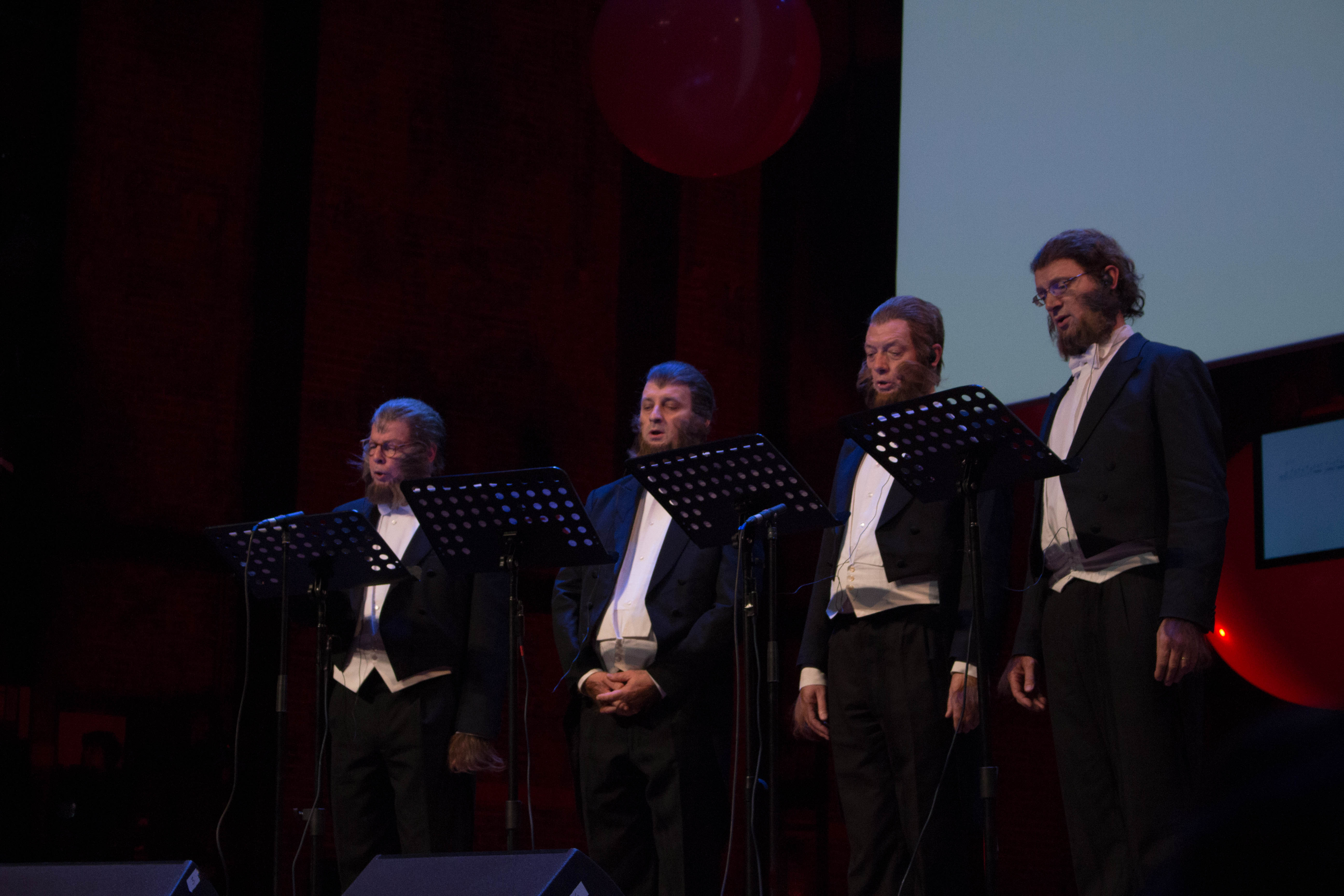
Egidius Quartet at TEDxAmsterdam 2014

The Egidius Kwartet is a Dutch vocal ensemble specialising in the music of the Franco-Flemish school, in particular of the Habsburgs, Margaret of Austria, governor of the Netherlands and her court at Mechelen. The ensemble was formed by four members of Ton Koopman's Amsterdam Baroque Choir in 1995.

The group's name is taken from Aegidius, a character in Dutch medieval literature, a minstrel lamented in the song Egidius waer bestu bleven (though the name also reflects Maître Egidius of the Chantilly Codex, as well as the Dutch name of Gilles Binchois). Their recording Egidius zingt Egidius places Egidius waer bestu bleven, and two ballades by "Maître Egidius," with tribute to Egidius from modern Dutch composers; Henk Badings, Joop Voorn, Ton de Leeuw, Daan Manneke, Bart Visman, Calliope Tsoupaki, Walter Hus - and then Donald Bentvelsen, the quartet's bass voice, who also supplied Quatre poèmes de Ossip Zadkine.

== Discography ==
The quartet has released over a dozen discs of renaissance music., including a 12-disc recording of the Leiden choirbooks: they recorded major pieces from the six choirbooks in six annual 2-CD releases from 2010 to 2015.
