= Juan Blas de Castro =

Spanish singer, musician and composer (1561–1631)

Juan Blas de Castro (1561 – August 6, 1631) was a Spanish singer, musician and composer.

Born in Barrachina, in the province of Teruel, Spain, he was the second of four brothers. In 1592, he became part of the court of the Duke of Alba in Alba de Tormes, Salamanca, together with his friend, the poet and playwright Lope de Vega. During his stay, he set to music several of Lope's poems. Both would leave Salamanca together. In 1597, Castro became a court musician to King Philip III of Spain, and, from June 15, 1599 an usher. He died in Madrid.

Back in Madrid from Valladolid, from 1606 he would collaborate closely with Lope de Vega, who would praise his art. Also Tirso de Molina would dedicate him appreciative texts.

In the Cancionero de la Sablonara, eighteen of his tonos survived. Lope and Góngora were the masters of the tono, romances with profane refrains. On his death, 771 tonos were found, both polyphonic and of popular themes, which have not been preserved. Most of his production centered on stage music, which has not survived either.
