= Manuel de Egüés =

Spanish composer

Manuel de Conejos y Egüés (3 June 1657 in San Martin del Rio – 11 April 1729 in Burgos) was a Spanish composer.
