= Philippe Rogier =

Franco-Flemish composer

Philippe Rogier (c. 1561 – 29 February 1596) was a Franco-Flemish composer of the Renaissance, active at the Habsburg court of Philip II in Spain. He was one of the last members of the Franco-Flemish school, in the closing days of the Renaissance period in music history, and was a prolific composer; however most of his music was lost in the destruction by fire of the library of John IV during the Lisbon earthquake of 1755.

== Life ==
He was born in Arras, then in the Spanish Netherlands now in France, around 1561. Presumably he received his early training there or nearby, and his talent was sufficient for him to be brought in 1572 to Spain to sing in the choir of Philip II in Madrid. Boys were often recruited from the Low Countries to become singers in the imperial chapel; the numerous cathedral schools in the towns of northern France and the Netherlands provided a rich environment from which the Habsburgs could cherry-pick the best musicians. Rogier became assistant director of the capilla flamenca in 1584, chaplain by 1586, and director of music at the court of Philip in 1586 on the death of the previous director, George de La Hèle. Sometime before 1595 he also became a priest.

Rogier accumulated honors as well, in the form of benefices and prebends; he also received a rich pension from the Bishop of Léon. He died in 1596 in Madrid, asking in his will that his assistant and fellow northerner, Géry de Ghersem, see to the publication of five of his masses. By the time he published them, the dedicatee Philip II had himself died, so he dedicated them to Philip III instead. Ghersem also added one of his own masses to the collection – the only one of his numerous works to survive to the present day complete.

== Music and influence ==
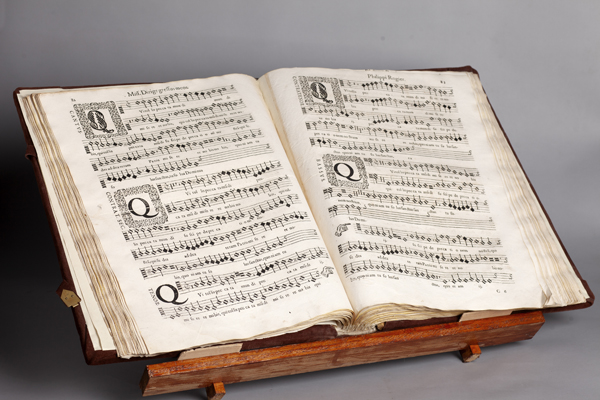
Polyphone mass by Rogier in Museo Parroquial, Pastrana

More of Rogier's music remains than that of his compatriot Géry de Ghersem. While most was destroyed in 1755 when the enormous library of John IV burned during the Lisbon earthquake, some had successfully been disseminated through publication or manuscript transmission; some of his work appears in manuscript in places as distant as Mexico (some manuscript psalm settings survive in the archives of Puebla Cathedral).

Rogier wrote both sacred and secular music, but as expected for a composer active in the royal chapel of a deeply religious monarch during the Counter-Reformation, the majority of it is sacred. Two instrumental pieces, possibly arrangements of vocal works, have survived as well. Of the 243 compositions listed in John IV's library catalogue (compiled in Lisbon in 1649), 36 motets, 7 masses, 4 chansons, 4 psalm verse settings, and two presumably instrumental compositions (since they are textless, and appear in collections for instrumental performance) have survived.

His published masses are for from four to six voices; one in manuscript exists in two versions, with one for eight and the other for twelve independent voice parts. Stylistically they recall music written fifty years before, particularly the elaborate polyphonic style of Nicolas Gombert, another member of the Habsburg chapel. Rogier's motets are also in the Franco-Flemish style of mid-century. His secular music, on the other hand, shows some progressive features that anticipate the Spanish music of the early 17th century, for example with their frequent use of syncopation.

Rogier was long a highly regarded composer, as shown by a laudatory reference in a poem, Laurel de Apolo by Lope de Vega, written in 1630 – more than three decades after his death. His music was published in places as distant as Madrid, Antwerp, and Naples.
