= Pedro Ruimonte =

Spanish composer and musician (1565–1627)

Pedro Ruimonte (or Rimonte, Ruymonte) (1565 – November 30, 1627) was a Spanish composer and musician who spent much of his career in the Low Countries.

== Early years ==
He was born in Zaragoza, the son of Pedro Ruimonte and Gracia de Bolea y Latas, and was baptized in the Church of San Pablo in 1565. Pedro had three sisters, Justa, Gracia and Catalina. It is believed that he studied under Melchor Robledo, who gave public classes on music in La Seo, although he also could have studied with several other noted musicians who were in the city in the 16th century. Until his arrival in Brussels, nothing further is known of him.

== Stay in Flanders ==
It is believed that Ruimonte arrived in Brussels in 1599 as a young man in the choir of the retinue of Archduke Albert of Austria and the Princess Isabel Clara Eugenia, new governors of the Low Countries.

On August 17, 1601, he wrote to his sister, stating that he was maestro de música en la capilla de Sus Altezas Serenísimas (master of music in the chapel of His Majesty). In 1604, he announced himself on the title page of Missae sex as Maestro de la Capilla y de la Cámara de Sus Excelencias (maestro di cappella and of the chamber of His Majesty). In 1614, the title page of Parnaso español de Madrigales y Villancicos reads Maestro de Música de la Cámara de los Serenísimos Príncipes Alberto y doña Isabel Clara Eugenia, Archiduques de Austria. It is probable that this difference in title is due to the arrival in 1605 of Géry de Ghersem, maestro of the Chapel Real of the Court of Madrid, who was to take charge of the chapel at the Court of Brussels. However, existing records show that Ruimonte was paid more than Ghersem, a measure of the esteem in which the Archduke held him.

As head of the musicians of the ducal court, aside from overseeing the boy singers, he had under his charge organists and composers of great stature, including the English Peter Philips and John Bull (then organist at the cathedral of Antwerp), and the Flemish Peeter Cornet and Philippe van der Meulen.

== Works ==
During his time in Flanders, he published works through the publisher Petrus Phalesius the Elder.

The first was Missae Sex IV. V. et VI. Vocum, published in 1604, and consisted of six masses which display the full range of musical forms and styles of the era. Among the works are parody masses of works of Palestrina and Guerrero.

In 1607, he published Cantiones sex vocum. The collection contains four 4-voice motets for Advent and six more 5 and 6-voice pieces for Lent, an antiphon, Salve Regina for 5 voices, a psalm, De profundis, for 7 voices, and Lamentations for six voices for Holy Week. Except for the lamentations, which are preserved in the Colegiata de Albarracín, the rest has been lost.

His most important work is the Parnaso español de Madrigales y Villancicos a cuatro, cinco y seis, published in 1614. It consists of nine madrigals in Castilian for 4, 5, and 6 voices and twelve villancicos for 5 and 6 voices.

== Return to Zaragoza ==
He returned to Zaragoza in 1614 and worked as a teacher. Among his students were Diego Pontac, and among his friends were Sebastián Aguilera de Heredia. He lived in the city until his death, living with his Catalan wife, the rich widow of Martín de Villanueva, a merchant and dyer.
