= Carlos Patiño =

Spanish composer (1600–1675)

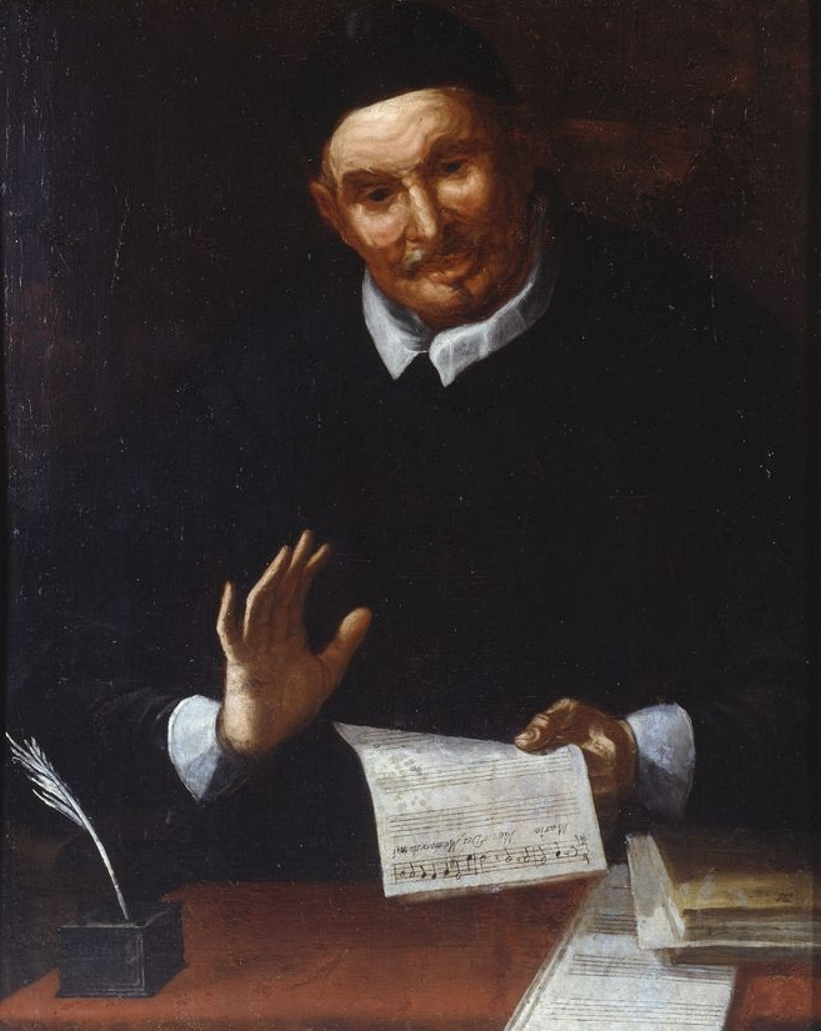
Carlos Patiño

Carlos Patiño (Cuenca 1600–Madrid 5 September 1675) was a Spanish Baroque composer.

Patiño was a choirboy at Seville Cathedral where he studied with Alonso Lobo. He married in 1622 but his wife's death in 1625 led to his entry into the priesthood. In March 1628 he became maestro de capilla of the Real Monasterio de la Encarnación, Madrid, where he succeeded Gabriel Díaz Bessón (1590–1638). On 1 January 1634 Patiño succeeded Mateo Romero as maestro de capilla in the royal chapel. He was the first maestro of the capilla real, formerly the Flemish chapel, to be born in Spain. In 1660 his request for retirement was denied, but he was provided with two assistants.

Most of his sacred works are polychoral. Several of his secular works were composed for court occasions. Many sacred works were lost in the 1755 Lisbon earthquake, but others survived in the New World. His theatre work included the music to El Nuevo Olimpo of 1648, but this too is lost.

== Works ==
- 13 masses
- 49 motets
- 21 psalms
- 6 litanies
- 11 cantos evangelicos
- 2 eucharist hymns
- 32 villancicos
- 14 tonos humanos
- Theatre music
