= Juan de Navas =

Spanish baroque composer and harpist

Juan de Navas (ca. 1650–1719) was a Spanish baroque composer and harpist. As court harpist to Charles II of Spain he was sought as approver of Torres y Martínez Bravo's treatise on thoroughbass.

== Works, editions and recordings ==
- villancicos - Angelicas escuadras and others.
- tonos humanos in the Guerra Manuscript and other sources.

Recordings:

- Ay, divino amor - on Cantadas de pasión Maria Luz Álvarez, Accentus Austria, Thomas Wimmer. Arcana 2005.
