= José Marín (composer) =

José Marín (ca. 1619–1699) was a Spanish Baroque harpist, guitarist, cantor, and composer noted for his secular songs, tonos humanos.

In 1644 he entered the Royal Convent of La Encarnación in Madrid as a tenor. He was a priest and cantor of the capilla real under Felipe IV and Carlos II. His career was marked by scandals and murder. He was sentenced to prison but escaped to regain respectability.

== Works ==
Website: http://www.JoseMarin.com Songs

- Corazon que en prision possibly refers to his own imprisonment.

Theatre music

- music for zarzuelas by the dramatist Juan Bautista Diamante.

== Selected discography ==
- José Marin, "Tonos humanos", Montserrat Figueras, Arianna Savall, Rolf Lislevand, et al. Alia Vox AVSA9802
