= Thomas Wimmer (musician) =

Austrian musician

Thomas Wimmer (Vienna) is an Austrian viol player and conductor of Accentus Austria.
