= Cristóbal Galán =

Spanish composer

Cristóbal Galán (c. 1630 – 24 September 1684) was a Spanish Baroque composer.

The first record of Galán is that in 1651 he was rejected as maestro de capilla in Sigüenza because he was married. From 1653 he was a singer and organist, then later maestro de capilla in Cagliari, Sardinia; then from 1656 to 1659 in Morella, Castellon. From 1660 to 1663 he worked in Madrid, in an unknown position. From 1664 to 1667 he was maestro de capilla at Segovia Cathedral, then moving to the Convent of Las Descalzas Reales, Madrid, where in 1680, five years after the death of Carlos Patiño, he became director of the capilla real. He died in Madrid.

In letters written in Madrid in 1675 and 1681 to Miguel de Irízar, Galán is cited as Madrid's principal composer of sacred music, since Juan Hidalgo de Polanco was only interested in writing tonos humanos. A generation later his style was still respected by Francisco Valls.

== Works ==
As with other Spanish Baroque composers, many works were lost in a fire at the royal archives. None of his music for autos sacramentales by Calderón survives. Complete edition by J.H. Baron and D.L. Heiple.

- Missa a 12
- Missa a 9
- Magnificat a 12
- St John Passion, a 8 1672
- Litany a 6
- Lamentations a 7
- 5 Motets: Hoc est corpus a 3. Laudate Dominum a 8. O beata virgo a 9. Salve a 5. Stella coeli a 8.
- Stabat mater for 3 soloists, violin and basso continuo.
- Villancicos for 1 to 13 voices.
- Tonos divinos: Atencion al retrato etc.
- Tonos humanos
- Theatre music including for plays by Juan Bautista Diamante (1625–1687): Lides de amor y desdén. El labyrinto de Creta.

== Discography ==
- Cristobal Galan: Al espejo que retrata. Al Ayre Espanol dir Eduardo Lopez Banzo. Deutsche Harmonia Mundi DHM 05472 773762 Tr 10.
