= Erik Van Nevel =

Belgian singer and conductor

Erik Van Nevel (1956) is a Belgian singer and conductor. He is the nephew of Paul Van Nevel.

He pursued instrumental and vocal studies at the Lemmensinstituut in Leuven, the Koninklijk Conservatorium (Brussels) and the Koninklijk Conservatorium (Antwerp).

Van Nevel is both founder and conductor of the Currende choir, the chamber ensemble Currende Consort and the Baroque orchestra known as Concerto Currende, and has also directed the wind ensemble Concerto Palatino. He was choirmaster of Brussels Cathedral from 1983 to 2000, and there founded the Cappella Sancti Michaelis. From 1980 to 1985, he was assistant conductor of the Belgian Radio Choir (Flemish section). Since 1994, van Nevel and Currende have been accorded the title of Cultural Ambassadors of Flanders by the Flemish Community.

Van Nevel has concentrated on Flemish Renaissance repertoire, recording for Flemish labels Accent, Eufoda and Etcetera. A major recording milestone was the 10-CD collection of Flemish polyphony produced for Davidsfonds to accompany the book Flemish Polyphony by musicologist Ignace Bossuyt.

He was director of the research project Sound of the cathedral into acoustics and performance space conflicts.
