= Nicolas Gombert =

Franco-Flemish composer

Nicolas Gombert (c. 1495 – c. 1560) was a Franco-Flemish composer of the Renaissance. He was one of the most famous and influential composers between Josquin des Prez and Palestrina, and best represents the fully developed, complex polyphonic style of this period in music history.

== Life ==
Details of his early life are sketchy, but he was probably born around 1495 in southern Flanders, probably between Lille and Saint-Omer, possibly in the town of La Gorgue. German writer and music theorist Hermann Finck wrote that Gombert studied with Josquin; this would have been during the renowned composer's retirement in Condé-sur-l'Escaut, sometime between 1515 and 1521.

Gombert was employed by the emperor Charles V as a singer in his court chapel in 1526 and possibly as a composer as well. Most likely he was taken on while Charles was passing through Flanders, for the emperor traveled often, bringing his retinue with him, and picking up new members as he went. A document dated 1529 mentions Gombert as magister puerorum ("master of the boys") for the royal chapel. He and the singers went with the emperor on his travels throughout his holdings, leaving records of their appearances in various cities of the empire. These visits were musically influential, in part because of Gombert's stature as a musician; thus the travels of Charles and his chapel, as did those of his predecessor Philip I of Castile with composer Pierre de la Rue, continued the transplantation of the Franco-Flemish polyphonic tradition onto the Iberian Peninsula. At some point in the 1530s Gombert became a cleric and probably a priest; he received benefices at several cathedrals, including Courtrai, Lens, Metz, and Béthune. He remained in the Imperial chapel as maître des enfants ("master of the children") until some time between 1537 and 1540, being succeeded by Thomas Crecquillon and later Cornelius Canis. Even though he held this very position at the Imperial chapel, he never officially received the title of maître de chapelle – music director – which was a title given to both Adrien Thibaut and Crecquillon. While serving in this position, he likewise unofficially held the position of court composer, arranging numerous works commemorating the key happenings during Charles' life.

In 1540 during the height of his career, he vanished from chapel records. According to a contemporary physician and mathematician Jerome Cardan, writing in Theonoston (1560), in 1540 "the musician, Gombert, was condemned to the triremes for violation of a boy in the service of the emperor. The exact duration of his service in the galleys is not known, but he was able to continue composing for at least part of the time. Most likely he was pardoned sometime in or before 1547, the date he sent a letter along with a motet from Tournai to Charles' gran capitano Ferrante I Gonzaga. The Magnificat settings preserved uniquely in manuscript in Madrid are often held to have been the "swansongs" that according to Cardan won his pardon; according to this story, Charles was so moved by these Magnificat settings that he let Gombert go early. An alternative hypothesis (Lewis 1994) is that Cardan was referring to the highly penitential First Book of four-part motets; however, in neither case is it clear how Gombert was able to compose while rowing in the galleys as a prisoner.

It is not known how long Gombert lived after his pardon or what positions, if any, he held; his career faded into relative obscurity after he was freed. He may have retired to Tournai, spending the final years of his life as canon there. Bracketing dates for his probable death are 1556 and 1561; in the former year Finck mentioned that he was still living, and in 1561 Cardan wrote that he was dead, without giving details.

== Music and style ==
Adrian Willaert and Nicolas Gombert are generally recognized as the exemplars of the late Franco-Flemish school, before the center of Renaissance art-music moved to Italy. A Fleming, Willaert relocated to Italy and along with the originally Flemish composer Orlando di Lasso brought the Franco-Flemish style of simultaneously dense and lyrical counterpoint to Italy. Like Willaert, Gombert brought the polyphonic style to its highest state of perfection; if imitation is a common device in Josquin, it is integral in Gombert.

Gombert's style is characterized by dense, inextricable polyphony. Extended homophonic passages are rare in his sacred works, and he is particularly fond of imitation at very close time intervals, a technically very difficult feat (although he only rarely wrote strict canon). He preferred the lower voice ranges instead of the four voices (SATB) which were the most common voicings for pieces at the time, such as five and six parts in mostly male registers. Gombert, unlike his predecessor and mentor, Josquin des Prez, used irregular numbers of voice entries and avoided precise divisions of phrases, resulting in a less-punctuated, more continuous sonic landscape. Syncopations and cross-accents are characteristic of his rhythmic idiom, giving ictus to his otherwise seamless, enduring lines.

Harmonically, Gombert's compositions stressed the traditional modal framework as a baseline, but especially in dense textures of six or more voices, he wrote polymodal sections wherein a subset of voices would sing the lowered pitches of F or B♭ while another subset would sing the raised pitches of F♯ or B: a D major and D minor chord or a G major and a G minor chord might be simultaneously sounded . Melodic motion in one voice that, to retain melodic and harmonic coherence with the other voices, employed musica ficta, or an extended set of pitches from the basic modal framework, was very prominent in his musical stylings. The false relations, usually between an F and an F♯ or a B♭ and B, create a dissonance that Gombert employed for emotional effect while adhering to traditional rules of counterpoint.

Exemplary among Gombert's formally perfect pieces that employ cross-relations are his six-voice motet on the death of Josquin, Musae Jovis, with its clashing semitones, and occasional root-position triads a tritone apart., and his six-voice chanson Tous les Regretz.

Out of the ten masses that Gombert composed, nine survive complete. The chronology of the masses is not known, but an approximate order can be deduced from stylistic characteristics. Two musical characteristics, sequence and ostinato, that were rare in Gombert’s later works, are present in his earlier masses Quam pulchra es and Tempore paschali.

The motet was Gombert's preferred form, and his compositions in this genre not only were the most influential part of his output, but they show the greatest diversity of compositional technique. His motets, alongside those of Adrian Willaert and Jacobus Clemens non Papa, stand out from the rest of the Flemish motet composers. Familiar characteristics of motets of the preceding generation, such as ostinato, canon, cantus firmus, and double texts, are unusual in Gombert's style, excepting where he used aspects of the previous generation's style as an homage, such as in his motet on the death of Josquin, Musae Jovis. When considering texts for his motets, Gombert obtained his inspiration from Scripture – such as the Psalms – as opposed to the liturgy of the Roman Catholic church. He was less attentive to textual placement and clarity than to the overall expressive sonority.

Gombert's eight settings of the Magnificat are among his most famous works. Each is written in one of the church modes, and consists of a cycle of short motets, with the individual motets based on successive verses of the Magnificat text. They may well have won him his pardon and paved the way for his rehabilitation : Cardin writes that '"the courage of Nicolas Gombert is to be commended no less than his good fortune. For after he had been condemned to the triremes, while in chains he composed those swan songs with which he earned not only his pardon by the emperor… but also received a priest's benefice, so that he spent the remainder of his life in tranquillity'.

Some of Gombert's works are for unusually large vocal ensembles, including 8, 10, and 12 voices. These works are not polychoral in the usual sense, or in the manner of the Venetian School in which the voices were spatially separated; rather, the voice sub-groupings change during the pieces. These large ensemble compositions include an eight-voice Credo, the 12-voice Agnus from the Missa Tempore paschali, and 10- and 12- voice settings of the Regina caeli. In comparison with the northern Italian cori spezzati style, Gombert’s multi-voice works were not antiphonal. Instead of dividing forces consistently, Gombert frequently changed the combinations of voice groups. These vocal pieces contained more direct repetition, sequence and ostinato than his other music.

His secular compositions – mostly chansons – are less contrapuntally complex than his motets and masses, but more so than the majority of contemporary secular pieces, especially the 'Parisian' chanson. During the middle of the sixteenth century, Gombert received credit for several of the Parisian chansons, but later studies have discovered that he was not the sole 'Nicolas' of those secular pieces but many were actually by Nicolas de La Grotte or Guillaume Nicolas. Authors of the texts used in many chansons, a genre in which Gombert excelled, were mostly anonymous. He turned to older verse, often of a folkish type, with typical subject matter including unhappy love, farewells, separations, infidelities and the like. Many of these chansons appeared in lute and vihuela arrangements, with their wide geographical distribution showing their immense popularity.

His surviving works include 10 masses, about 140 motets, about 70 chansons, a canción (probably written when he was in Spain), a madrigal, and a handful of instrumental pieces.

== Influence ==
Gombert was one of the most renowned composers in Europe after the death of Josquin des Prez, as can be seen by the wide distribution of his music, the use of his music as source material for compositions by others, including Orlando di Lasso and Claudio Monteverdi. Printers paid singular attention to him, issuing for example, editions consisting solely of his works – most print editions at the time were anthologies of music by several composers. Although highly admired by his contemporaries, the next generation of Franco-Flemish composers mostly wrote in a more simplified style. Part of this was an inevitable stylistic reaction to a contrapuntal idiom which had reached an extreme, and part of this was due to the specific dictates of the Council of Trent, which required that text be understandable in sacred, especially liturgical, music – something which is next to impossible for a composer to achieve in a dense imitative texture.

While most composers of the next generation did not continue to write vocal music using Gombert's method of pervasive imitation, they continued to use this contrapuntal texture in instrumental works. Forms such as the canzona and ricercar are directly descended from the vocal style of Gombert; Baroque forms and processes such as the fugue are later descendants. Gombert's music represents one of the extremes of contrapuntal complexity ever attained in purely vocal music.

== Recordings ==
- Nicolas Gombert, Music from the Court of Charles V, Huelgas Ensemble, Sony Vivarte SK 48249
- Nicolas Gombert, Missa media vita, etc., Hilliard Ensemble, ECM New Series 1884
- Nicolas Gombert, Gombert: Motets, Beauty Farm, Fra Bernardo FB 1504211
- Nicolas Gombert, Gombert: Motets II, Beauty Farm, Fra Bernardo FB 1612457
- Nicolas Gombert, Gombert: Masses, a la Coronatione, Media Vita, Philomena Previa, Beati Omnes. Motets, Media Vita, Beati omnes. Beauty Farm, Fra Bernado FB 2005329
- Nicolas Gombert, Magnificat 1, etc., Oxford Camerata, Naxos 8.557732
- Nicolas Gombert, Magnificats 1–4, Tallis Scholars, CD Gimell Records CDGIM 037
- Nicolas Gombert, Magnificats 5–8, Tallis Scholars, CD Gimell Records CDGIM 038
- Nicolas Gombert, Eight-part Credo, etc., Henry's Eight: Hyperion CDA 66828
- Nicolas Gombert, Missa Tempore paschali, etc., Henry's Eight, Hyperion CDA 66943
- Heavenly Spheres, CBC Records, MVCD 1121, sung by Studio de musique ancienne de Montréal. Contains two motets by Gombert, including his elegy for Josquin, Musae Jovis.
- Flemish Masters, Virginia Arts Recordings, VA-04413, performed by Zephyrus. Includes Gombert's motet, Lugebat David Absalon, the Obrecht Missa Sub tuum presidium, as well as motets by Willaert, Clemens non Papa, Ockeghem, Des Prez, and Mouton.
- Christmas to Candlemas, Ensemble Gombert, Tall Poppies TP192. Includes Gombert's motet "Hodie nobis caelorum" and seasonal works by Mouton, Josquin, de Silva, Clemens non Papa, Tallis, Victoria, Lassus, Sheppard and Palestrina.
- Josquin to Martin, Ensemble Gombert, Move Records MCD 277. Includes Gombert's motet "Regina caeli laaetare" and works by Josquin, de Monte, Byrd, Brahms ("Drei Motetten," op. 110) and Frank Martin (Mass for Double Choir).
- Nicolas Gombert, Nicolas Gombert 1, The Sound and the Fury, ORF CD 463. Includes Missa Quam Pulchra Es, Ave Maria, Salve Maria, Sancta Maria, Da Pacem, Inviolata.
- Nicolas Gombert, Nicolas Gombert 2, The Sound and the Fury, ORF SACD 3006. Includes Missa Sur Tous Regrets, Si Ignoras Te, Homo Erat in Jerusalem, Sancta Mundi, Ave Salus Mundi, Emendemus, Ne Reminiscaris Domine, Salvator Mundi.
- Nicolas Gombert, Nicolas Gombert 3, The Sound and the Fury, ORF CD 3077. Includes twelve motets.
- Nicolas Gombert, Tribulatio et angustia, Brabant Ensemble, Stephen Rice, Hyperion CDA67614
- Nicolas Gombert, Motets, Chansons, and a Magnificat, Capella Alamire, Urquhart, Naxos 8.570180
- Listen to free recordings of songs from Umeå Akademiska Kör.
