= Tono humano =

17c. Spanish/Portuguese music genre

The tono humano (secular song) was one of the main genres of 17th Century Spanish and Portuguese music.

The term tonadas is also used for tonos humanos in 17th Century musical literature but the 17th Century tonada is to be distinguished from the modern folk tonada song in Chile or for guitar band in Argentina.

In the early 17th Century the main vernacular forms for Spanish and Portuguese composers were the villancico, usually a Christmas song, and the solo tono; tono humano if secular, tono divino if sacred. The cantata form had not yet been introduced from Italy. At this point tonos were generally strophic songs (coplas) with a refrain (estribillo). However, by the end of the 17th century some tonos had begun to include recitative and aria sections, as the cantada, Spanish form of the cantata became known around 1700. The tono humano and tono divino could also have 2, 3 or 4 voices.

Nearly all tonos humanos and semi-sacred villancicos were preserved only in manuscript. The best copies were in the Royal Palace in Madrid and in the nearby Buen Retiro, both of which were lost in fires. This, and the fall from fashion of the tono and villancico in the Iberian Peninsula, means that sources in Ibero-America are relatively important to recovery of this part of Iberian musical heritage.

The Libro de tonos humanos Madrid 1656 (Biblioteca Nacional, M-1262) is the most substantial Iberian cancionero of the 17th Century with over 200 songs, almost all romances with estribillo in 4 voices. Additional surviving sources include the Mackworth manuscript.

The tono was used both in theatre music, domestic music and church music. Composers active in the composition of tonos humanos include:

- Francisco Guerrero (1528–1599)
- Juan Blas de Castro (1561–1631)
- Pedro Ruimonte (1565–1627)
- Gaspar Fernandes (1566–1629)
- Mateo Romero El maestro capitán (1575–1647)
- Juan Arañés - Libro segundo de tonos y villancicos, Rome 1624
- Manuel Machado (1590–1646)
- Carlos Patiño (1600–1675)
- Manuel Correia (1600–1653)
- Bernardo Murillo (fl. 1642–1656) - song "La pastora"
- Juan Hidalgo de Polanco (1612–1685) - 21 tonos humanos, 28 tonos divinos
- José Marín (1618–1699)
- Juan del Vado (1625–1691)
- Clemente Imaña
- Cristóbal Galán (1630–1684)
- Miguel de Irízar (1635–1684)
- Juan Romeo (fl. 1675)
- Diego Fernandez de Huete (1635–1713)
- Gaspar Sanz (1640–1710)
- Tomás de Torrejón y Velasco (1644–1728)
- Juan de Navas (1647–1709)
- Francisco Guerau (1649–c 1720) - instrumental tonos for guitar.
- Sebastián Durón (1660–1716)
- José de Torres (1665–1738)
- Francisco Valls (1665–1747)
- Juan Francés de Iribarren (1699–1767)
- José de Nebra (1702–1768)

In the New World the tono was taken up by:

- Juan Serqueira of Lima (c.1655–1726)

== Academic study ==
In recent years the tono humano has been the focus of intersemiotic study by musicologists.
