= Thomas Crecquillon =

Franco-Flemish musician and composer

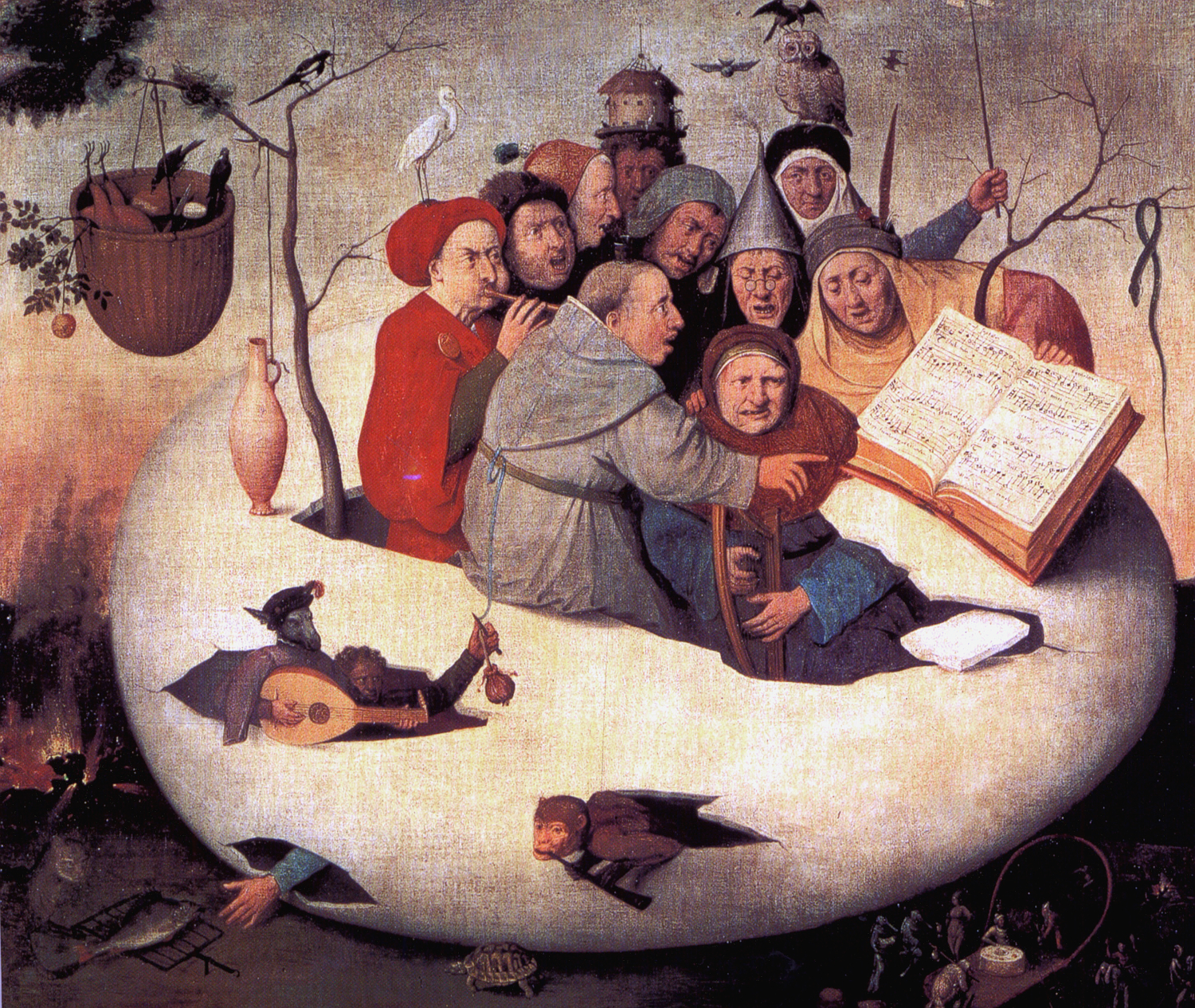
Concert in the Egg, by follower of Hieronymus Bosch, showing music by Thomas Crecquillon from 1569

Thomas Crecquillon or Créquillon (c. 1505 – probably early 1557) was a Franco-Flemish school composer of the Renaissance. While his place of birth is unknown, it was probably within the region loosely known at the time as the Low Countries, and he probably died at Béthune.

== Biography ==
Very little is known about his early life. He was a priest and a member of the chapel of Emperor Charles V, but whether he was maître de chapelle or merely a singer is still a matter of dispute; the surviving documents are contradictory. Later he seems to have held positions at Dendermonde, Béthune, Leuven, and Namur. Unlike many of the composers of the Franco-Flemish school, he seems never to have left his home region for Italy or other parts of Europe. Crecquillon was retired by 1555, and most likely he died in 1557, probably a victim of the serious outbreak of the plague in Béthune that year. The location of his burial remains a mystery, and no likeness of Crecquillon is known to exist.

Crecquillon's music was highly regarded by his contemporaries, and shows a harmonic and melodic smoothness which prefigures the culminating polyphonic style of Palestrina. He wrote twelve masses, more than 100 motets and almost 200 chansons. Stylistically he uses points of imitation, rather in the manner of Josquin des Prez, in almost all of his sacred works (the masses and motets), following the contemporary trend toward pervading imitation and polyphonic complexity. Unlike Josquin, however, Crecquillon rarely varies his texture for dramatic effect, preferring smoothness and consistency.

His secular chansons, unlike most of those by other composers of the same time, also use pervading imitation, although as is normal in a lighter form of music, they make considerable use of repetition (for example of the final phrase). Because they were imitative, it was Crecquillon's chansons which provided some of the best models for the later development of the instrumental canzona, the instrumental form which developed directly from the chanson. Many of his chansons were arranged for instruments, especially lute.

The printers Petrus Phalesius the Elder (of Leuven) and Tielman Susato (of Antwerp) published more music by him than by any other composer, which shows the extent of his reputation at the time, though his music is not as often recorded today as is that of many of the Netherlanders working at the same time.

His name is pronounced "toh-MAH krehk-kee-YON." Some historical sources spell the composer's last name with an acute accent mark above its "e", in which case the composer's last name is actually pronounced "krayk-kee-YON."

== Scores ==
- Free scores by Thomas Crecquillon in the Choral Public Domain Library (ChoralWiki)
- Free scores by Thomas Crecquillon at the International Music Score Library Project (IMSLP)
- The complete musical works of Thomas Crecquillon (the Opera Omnia) were published in twenty volumes, between 1974 and 2011, by the American Institute of Musicology.
