= Franco-Flemish School =

Style of vocal music

The designation Franco-Flemish School, also called Netherlandish School, Burgundian School, Low Countries School, Flemish School, Dutch School, or Northern School, refers to the style of polyphonic vocal music composition originating from France and from the Burgundian Netherlands in the 15th and 16th centuries as well as to the composers who wrote it. The spread of their technique, especially after the revolutionary development of printing, produced the first true international style since the unification of Gregorian chant in the 9th century. Franco-Flemish composers mainly wrote sacred music, primarily masses, motets, and hymns.

== Term and controversy ==
Several generations of Renaissance composers from the region loosely known as the Low Countries (Imperial and French fiefs ruled in personal union by the House of Valois-Burgundy in the period from 1384 to 1482)—i.e. present-day Northern France, Belgium and the Southern Netherlands—are grouped under "Franco-Flemish School", though a teacher-student-relationship between them rarely existed. Most of these musicians were born in the thriving Burgundian provinces of Artois, Flanders, Brabant, Hainaut, or Limburg. Others were born in Northern and Southern France, like Guillaume Faugues, Simone de Bonefont and Antoine Brumel who was one of the most influential composers of his generation. During periods of political and economic stability, the courts of the Burgundian dukes were a centre of cultural activity in Europe.

Franco-Flemish composers had their origins in ecclesiastical choir schools such as at the cathedrals and collegiate churches of Saint-Quentin, Arras, Valenciennes, Douai, Bourges, Liège, Tournai, Cambrai, Mons, Antwerp, Bruges, and Ghent, although they were famous for working elsewhere. Numerous musicians established themselves in French court or moved to the European courts in Italy where they were called "I fiamminghi" or Oltremontani ("those from over the Alps") and Spain—notably in the Flemish chapel (capilla flamenca) of the Habsburgs, or to towns in Germany, and other parts of Europe—Poland, the Czech lands, Austria, Hungary, England, Sweden, Denmark, Saxony—carrying their styles with them. The exact centres shifted during this time, and by the end of the sixteenth century the focal point of the Western musical world had moved from the Low Countries to Italy.

The expression "Franco-Flemish" (as well as the more biased term "Dutch school") are still the subject of some controversy among musicologists. They were not in use at that time and seem to cover only part of the linguistic, political, territorial and historical reality.

== Development ==
Following are five groups, or generations, that are sometimes distinguished in the Franco-Flemish/Netherlandish school. Development of this musical style was continuous, and these generations only provide useful reference points.

- The First generation (1420–1450), dominated by Guillaume Du Fay and Gilles Binchois; these composers are most often known as the Burgundian School, along with the later Antoine Busnois. The origins of the style of the first generation embraces both earlier Burgundian traditions and also Italian and English styles. For example, in 1442, the poet Martin le Franc praised Binchois and Du Fay for following Dunstaple in adopting the contenance angloise ("English character").
- The Second generation (1450–1485), with Ockeghem as its main exponent, others include Busnois, Orto, Compère, Prioris, Agricola, Caron, Faugues, Regis and Tinctoris.
- The Third generation (1480–1520): Jean Mouton, Obrecht, de la Rue, Isaac, Brumel, Févin, Pipelare, Richafort, Divitis and most significantly Josquin des Prez.
- The Fourth generation (1520–1560): Gombert, Phinot, Crecquillon, Manchicourt, Arcadelt, Rore, Willaert, Courtois, Clemens non Papa and Bonefont.
- The Fifth generation (1560–1615/20): Lasso, de Monte, Vaet, Regnart, Luython, Ghersem, Wert, de Macque, Goudimel and Rogier. By this time, many of the composers of polyphonic music were native to Italy and other countries: the Netherlandish style had naturalized on foreign soil, and become a true European style.

== The Franco-Flemish motet ==
Composed between 1450 and 1520, these motets were typically written for four voices, with all voices being equal. They often exhibit thick, dark textures, with an extended low range. The most notable composers of this style include Ockeghem and Josquin, whose De profundis clamavi ad te, composed between 1500 and 1521, provides a good example.

== See also ==
- Category:Franco-Flemish composers
