= Pierrequin de Thérache =

French composer

Pierrequin de Thérache also Pierre or Petrus de Therache (c.1470-1528) was a French renaissance composer from Nancy.

He served as a master of the children from 1500–1527, was maître de chapelle of René II and Antoine de Lorraine, and musician in the chapel of Louis XII. He was also connected with the composers Antoine Brumel, Pierre de La Rue, Antoine de Longueval, and Marbrianus de Orto at the reestablished Burgundian musical chapel la Grand Chapelle at Mechelen under Archduchess Margaret of Austria, regent for the infant Charles V.

== Works, editions and recordings ==
Surviving works include three mass settings, three four-voice motets and a magnificat. His works are found in the Medici Codex of 1518, along with Costanzo Festa, Andreas de Silva, Jean Lhéritier, Johannes de la Fage, Jean Richafort, Adrian Willaert, Antoine Bruhier, Pierre Moulu, Jean Mouton, and others.

- Missa Fortuna Desperata
