= Requiem (Ockeghem) =

15th-century Requiem setting by Johannes Ockeghem

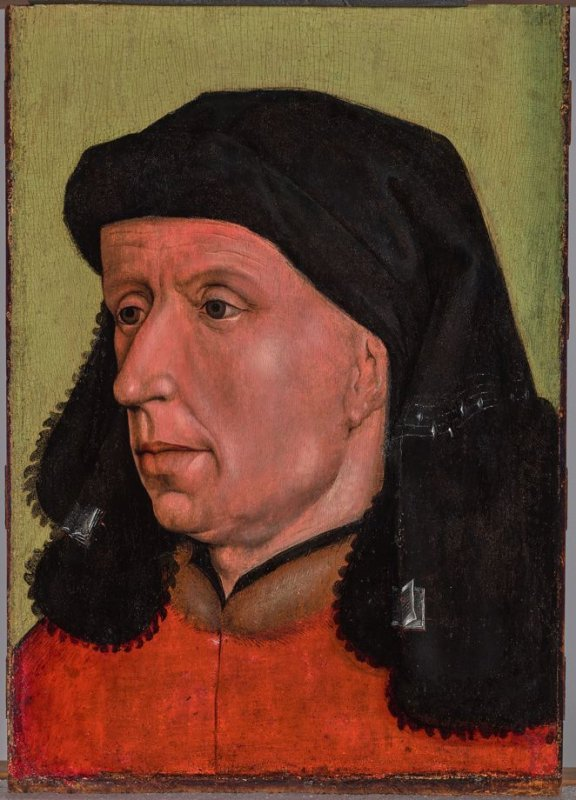
Speculative posthumous portrait of Johannes Ockeghem

Requiem, by Johannes Ockeghem (c. 1410 – 1497), is a polyphonic setting of the Roman Catholic Requiem Mass (the Missa pro defunctis, or Mass for the dead). It is probably the earliest surviving polyphonic setting of any requiem mass. It is unusual in that the movements vary greatly in style, and each uses a paraphrase technique for the original Sarum chant. It has five movements for two to four voices and is one of Ockeghem's best known and most performed works.

Ockeghem's Requiem is often considered incomplete as it lacks a Sanctus, Communion or Agnus Dei. The closing movement, the Offertory, is the most complex. Blank opening sections in the Codex imply that there may have been another movement. The circumstances of its composition are unclear; it may have been composed for the funeral of Charles VII in 1461; an alternative hypothesis is that it was written after the death of Louis XI in 1483.

== Requiem ==
This requiem is the earliest surviving polyphonic setting of the Requiem Mass, as a possibly earlier setting by Guillaume Dufay, written for use by the Order of the Golden Fleece, has not survived. It remains one of Ockeghem's most famous and often-performed compositions.

Ockeghem's Requiem is unusual compared both to his other works and to other settings of the requiem. Each of the movements uses a paraphrase technique for the original Sarum chant, something Ockeghem did rarely, and they are all very different from each other stylistically. The selection of movements is also unusual compared to other requiem masses:

1. Introitus: Requiem aeternam (3 voices)
2. Kyrie (2, 3 & 4 vv.)
3. Graduale: Si ambulem (3 & 4 vv.)
4. Tractus: Sicut cervus desiderat (2 & 3 vv.)
5. Offertorium: Domine Jesu Christe (4 vv.)

Since it lacks a Sanctus, Agnus Dei or Communion, most scholars consider it incomplete. It survives in only one manuscript source, the Chigi Codex. Since the document seems to have been intended as a complete collection of Ockeghem's music, these movements were probably left out because they were either unavailable either to the copyist or not in a legible condition. Blank opening sections in the codex also imply that at least one other movement, probably a three-voice setting of the Communion in a more sedate style recalling the opening Introit, was originally intended to close the work. Movements appear to be missing in two other masses transcribed in the codex as well, Ma maistresse and Fors seulement.

The style of the Ockeghem Requiem is appropriately austere for a setting of the Mass for the Dead; indeed, the lack of polyphonic settings of the requiem until the late 15th century was probably due to the perception that polyphony was not sober enough for such a purpose. Portions of the work, especially the opening Introit, are written in the treble-dominated style reminiscent of the first half of the 15th century, with the chant in the topmost voice (superius) and the accompanying voices singing mostly in parallel motion in a fauxbourdon-like manner. Within each movement there are subsections for two or three voices which provide contrast with the fuller four-voice textures that surround them and provide a sense of climax, a procedure typical of Ockeghem.

The closing movement, the Offertory, is the most contrapuntally complex, and may have been intended as the climax of the entire composition.

Precise dating of the Requiem has not been possible. Richard Wexler proposed 1461, the year of Charles VII's death, a monarch to whom Ockeghem owed a debt of gratitude and for whom he would likely have composed a requiem. If this date is correct, Ockeghem's Requiem could have predated the lost one of Dufay, the date of which is also speculative. Another possibility is that Ockeghem may have composed it instead for the death of Louis XI in 1483, or even towards the end of his own life; poet Guillaume Crétin alludes to the composition of a possibly recent requiem in his Déploration, written on the death of Ockeghem.
