= Gilles Mureau =

French composer and singer

Gilles Mureau (also Mureue, as he spelled it himself) (c. 1450 – July 1512) was a French composer and singer of the Renaissance. He was active in central France, mainly Chartres, and was one of the composers listed by Eloy d'Amerval in his long 1508 poem Le livre de la deablerie as one of the great composers of the age, resident in Paradise – even though he was still alive. While he probably wrote a substantial number of works, only four secular compositions survive.

== Life ==
Nothing is known about his origin, but he first appears in the cathedral of Chartres as a boy singer in 1462. He became choirmaster of the boys in the Chartres choir school in 1469, which makes a birthdate of 1450 a fair approximation. In 1472 he became a canon. Between March and November 1483 he made a pilgrimage to Jerusalem, being replaced in his duties at Chartres by the young Antoine Brumel (this is the earliest mention of this renowned composer). The following year Mureau made another pilgrimage, this one to Santiago de Compostela.

Details of his subsequent career are spotty, and he may have remained in Chartres or the general area. He evidently knew many of the prominent composers in central France around the turn of the 16th century. Johannes Tinctoris and Johannes Ockeghem are two he certainly knew personally, as the former was also associated with Chartres, and Ockeghem was at Tours, the church of which was closely connected with Chartres. An obituary for Mureau is recorded in Chartres in July 1512.

== Music ==
Only four pieces by Mureau survive, all rondeaux. They are found in various sources, including Petrucci's famous Odhecaton. They are typical of the refined French secular music of the late 15th century, with balanced phrases, careful attention to melody and clear delineation of the text; some brief portions use imitation.

== References and further reading ==
- David Fallows: "Gilles Mureau", Grove Music Online, ed. L. Macy (Accessed June 29, 2006), (subscription access)
- Gustave Reese, Music in the Renaissance. New York, W.W. Norton & Co., 1954. ISBN 0-393-09530-4
