= Du tout plongiet =

French chanson

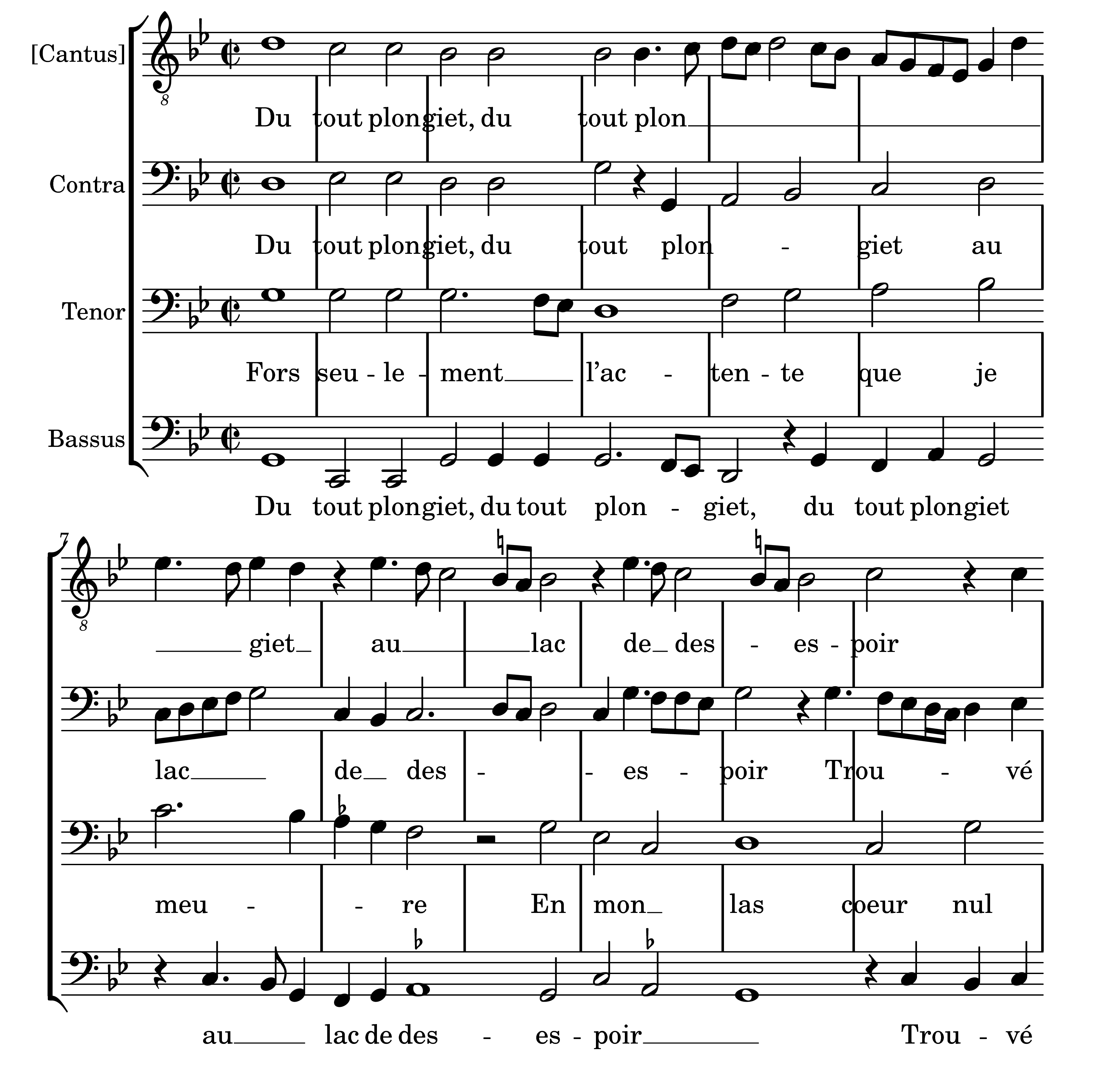
"Du tout plongiet – Fors seulement", Brumel's double setting

"Du tout plongiet – Fors seulement"
MIDI version

Du tout plongiet is a French chanson.

Antoine Brumel wrote a polytextual version, combining a tenor setting of Du tout plongiet with the words and superius from Ockeghem's 'Fors seulement l'attente' for the baritone.

David Munrow, writing in the notes to The Art of the Netherlands, gives the following words and translation for the first verse.

Du tout plongiet au lac de desespoir,
Trouve me suis sans attente n'espoir
D'avoir jamais des biens de Fortune;
Mais, se trouver puis scayson oportune,
Je me assairay d'en quelque chose avoir.

Plunged deep in the lake of despair,
I can neither expect nor hope
ever to enjoy Fortune's gifts.
But if I have the opportunity,
I shall endeavour to enjoy some.
