= Alto =

Type of vocal range

The musical term alto, meaning "high" in Italian (from Latin: altus), historically refers to the contrapuntal part higher than the tenor and its associated vocal range. In four-part voice leading alto is the second-highest part, sung in choruses by either low women's or high men's voices. In vocal classification these are usually called mezzo-soprano, contralto and male alto or countertenor.

== Etymology ==
In choral music for mixed voices, "alto" describes the lowest part commonly sung by women. The explanation for the anomaly of this name is to be found not in the use of adult falsettists in choirs of men and boys but further back in innovations in composition during the mid-15th century. Before this time it was usual to write a melodic cantus or superius against a tenor (from Latin tenere, to hold) or 'held' part, to which might be added a contratenor, which was in counterpoint with (in other words, against = contra) the tenor. The composers of Ockeghem's generation wrote two contratenor parts and designated them as contratenor altus and contratenor bassus; they were respectively higher and lower than the tenor part. From these derive both the modern terms "alto" (and contralto) and "bass".

== In opera ==
According to The New Grove Dictionary of Opera (1992), the term "alto" refers to singers whose voice encompasses the pitches of the notes f to d″ (see Helmholtz pitch notation). The singer of this voice type is more often described, for a female, as a contralto; for a male, as a countertenor (or in early French music as haute-contre) or a falsetto singer. A castrato may also sing in this range.

== Solo voices ==
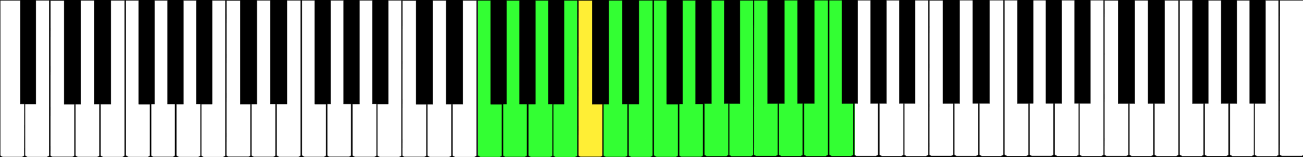
Alto vocal range, F_{3} to F_{5}, notated on the treble staff (left) and on piano keyboard in green with the yellow key marking middle C

The contralto voice is a matter of vocal timbre and tessitura as well as range, and a classically trained solo contralto would usually have a range greater than that of a normal choral alto part in both the upper and lower ranges. However, the vocal tessitura of a classically trained contralto would still make these singers more comfortable singing in the lower part of the voice. A choral non-solo contralto may also have a low range down to D_{3} (thus perhaps finding it easier to sing the choral tenor part), but some would have difficulty singing above E_{5}. In a choral context mezzo-sopranos and contraltos might sing the alto part, together with countertenors, thus having three vocal timbres (and two means of vocal production) singing the same notes.

The use of the term "alto" to describe solo voices is mostly seen in contemporary music genres (pop, rock, etc.) to describe singers whose range is lower than that of a mezzo-soprano but higher than that of a true contralto, and is very rarely seen in classical music outside of soloists in choral works. In classical music, most women with an alto range would be grouped within mezzo-sopranos, but many terms in common usage in various languages and in different cultures exist to describe solo classical singers with this range. Examples include contralto, countertenor, haute-contre, and tenor altino, among others.

== In choral music ==
In SATB four-part mixed chorus, the alto is the second-highest vocal range, above the tenor and bass and below the soprano. The alto range in choral music is approximately from F_{3} (the F below middle C) to F_{5} (the second F above middle C). In common usage, alto is used to describe the voice type that typically sings this part, though this is not strictly correct. Alto, like the other three standard modern choral voice classifications (soprano, tenor and bass) was originally intended to describe a part within a homophonic or polyphonic texture, rather than an individual voice type and the terms alto and contralto are not interchangeable nor synonymous.

Although some women who sing alto in a choir are contraltos, many would be more accurately called mezzo-sopranos (a voice of somewhat higher range and different timbre). Men singing in this range are countertenors, although this term is a source of considerable controversy, some authorities preferring the usage of the term "male alto" for those countertenors who use a predominantly falsetto voice production (boys singing in their natural range may be termed "boy altos").

== See also ==
- Voice classification in non-classical music
