= Fortuna desperata =

Secular Italian song

Fortuna desperata is a secular Italian song, possibly originally by Busnois (but others credit Antoine Brumel). It was used by many other authors in the following 75 years, for both variations and cantus firmus masses, and over 30 such reworkings are known. Words in the original Italian and in English and German are available at Choral Wiki .

The first verse is

'Fortuna desperata
Iniqua e maledecta
Che de tal dona electa
La fama hai denigrata.'

translated as

'Desperate fate,
iniquitous and maledicted
who blackened the good name
of a woman beyond compare.'

Amongst the more well-known versions of the song are the three-voice version by Busnois, its reworking for six voices by Alexander Agricola, a three-part instrumental version possibly by Josquin, three-voice version by Heinrich Isaac, and seven settings (including quodlibets) by Ludwig Senfl. See (archive from 29 December 2014, accessed 26 February 2016) for several others.

== Parody masses ==
Amongst the mass-settings are those by Josquin and Obrecht and Pierquin de Thérache.
