= Missa Mi-mi =

Mass setting by Johannes Ockeghem

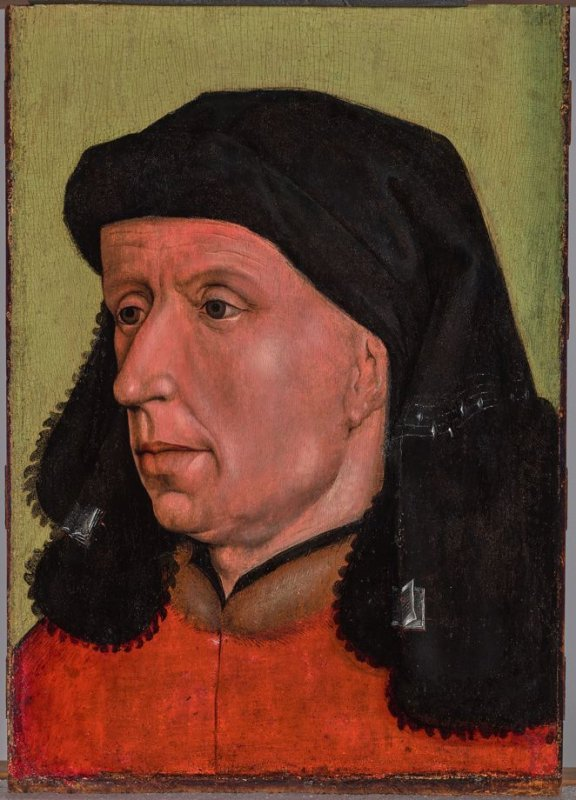
Speculative posthumous portrait of Johannes Ockeghem

The Missa Mi-mi is a musical setting of the Ordinary of the Mass by Johannes Ockeghem. It is a motto mass based on one of Ockeghem's own chansons, "Presque transi." The mass contains several motives and ideas from this chanson beyond just the head-motive.

== Music ==
The mass is for four voices, and is in the usual parts:

1. Kyrie
2. Gloria
3. Credo
4. Sanctus
5. Agnus Dei

== Source and Naming ==
The most authoritative source for this mass is the Chigi codex. Here, the mass appears as 'Mi-mi.' Other early sources are generally untitled, or it is sometimes referred to as "Missa Quarti toni" ( or "Mass in Mode 4"). There has been much debate about what the solmization designation of 'Mi-mi' refers too, and whether this title was given by Ockeghem. Earlier scholars generally assumed that 'Mi-mi' referred to the opening bass motive, which would involve the solmization syllables 'mi' and 'mi' in the normal and soft hexachord, respectively. Rebecca Stewart points out that using the hard hexachord is most likely the way a Renaissance singer would approach this interval, which would avoid the need for mutation. Ross W. Duffin has more recently proposed that 'Mi-mi' is possibly another way to refer to Mode 4 - through defining the solmization of the outer limits of the two hexachords used in the mode.
