= Johannes Fedé =

French composer

Johannes Fedé (also Jean Sohier) (c. 1415 – 1477?) was a French composer of the early Renaissance. While he was mentioned by Eloy d'Amerval as one of the greatest composers of the age, and resident in Paradise, relatively few of his works have survived. He was a contemporary of Johannes Ockeghem, and spent his life in the Burgundian Netherlands, France and Italy.

== Life ==
Fedé was probably from the region of Artois, most likely from Douai, based on the presence of several possible relatives of his at Cambrai Cathedral, several of whom had "of Douai" appended to their names. From 1439 to 1440 he was vicar at St. Amé in Douai. By 1443 he had gone to Italy, a region which was to become a common destination for composers from northern Europe for the next one hundred fifty years: Fedé sang in the papal chapel in Rome. From July 1445 to March 1446 he worked in Ferrara, at the court chapel of Leonello d'Este. Fedé thus was one of the earliest composers from northern Europe to work in Ferrara, a rich center of artistic patronage, which was to become a center of musical innovation for the remainder of the Renaissance.

Later in 1446 he was back in Cambrai, working as "petit vicar" at the cathedral there. He did not stay long, for by 1449 he was in Paris, employed by the Ste Chapelle as a chaplain, where he stayed until 1450, and in 1451 he was part of the chapel of Charles VII (Charles d'Orléans). After the death of Charles in 1461 (and a 10-year gap in his record), Fedé served in the chapel of Queen Marie d'Anjou, until she died in 1463. In 1466 he likely returned to Italy briefly, for his name appears in the rolls of the singers at St. Peter's in Rome, but he probably returned to France shortly thereafter. Three other employment records remain in France: a payment note at Ste Chapelle in Bourges in 1472-1473, another at the royal chapel of Louis XI in 1473, and a series of payments between 1472 and 1477 at the Ste Chapelle in Paris. Fedé probably died in Paris in 1477, since the payments stopped then, but no exact record of his death remains.

== Music and influence ==
Fedé wrote both sacred and secular music, but only a few pieces have survived of what may have been a substantial output, based on his reputation, and his appearance as one of the great composers of the age in Eloy's massive 1508 poem, which listed the composers resident in Heaven. Several two-voice settings of the Magnificat by Fedé survive in manuscripts preserved at Ferrara. Some of his secular pieces, a rondeau and two virelai, survive in a chansonnier from Nivelles, but were not recovered until the development of ultraviolet document-recovery technology in 1984, for most of them had been carefully erased. The apparent deliberate eradication of only Fedé's music from this collection suggests that the original owner of the book either did not care for the composer or the music.

Stylistically his music is typical of French music of the middle 15th century, including the use of fauxbourdon, but no focused scholarly analysis has yet been performed on his five compositions with reliable attribution.

== References and further reading ==
- David Fallows: "Johannes Fedé", Grove Music Online, ed. L. Macy (Accessed June 28, 2006), (subscription access)
- The New Grove Dictionary of Music and Musicians, ed. Stanley Sadie. 20 vol. London, Macmillan Publishers Ltd., 1980. ISBN 1-56159-174-2
- Gustave Reese, Music in the Renaissance. New York, W.W. Norton & Co., 1954. ISBN 0-393-09530-4
