= Jacobus Barbireau =

Franco-Flemish Renaissance composer

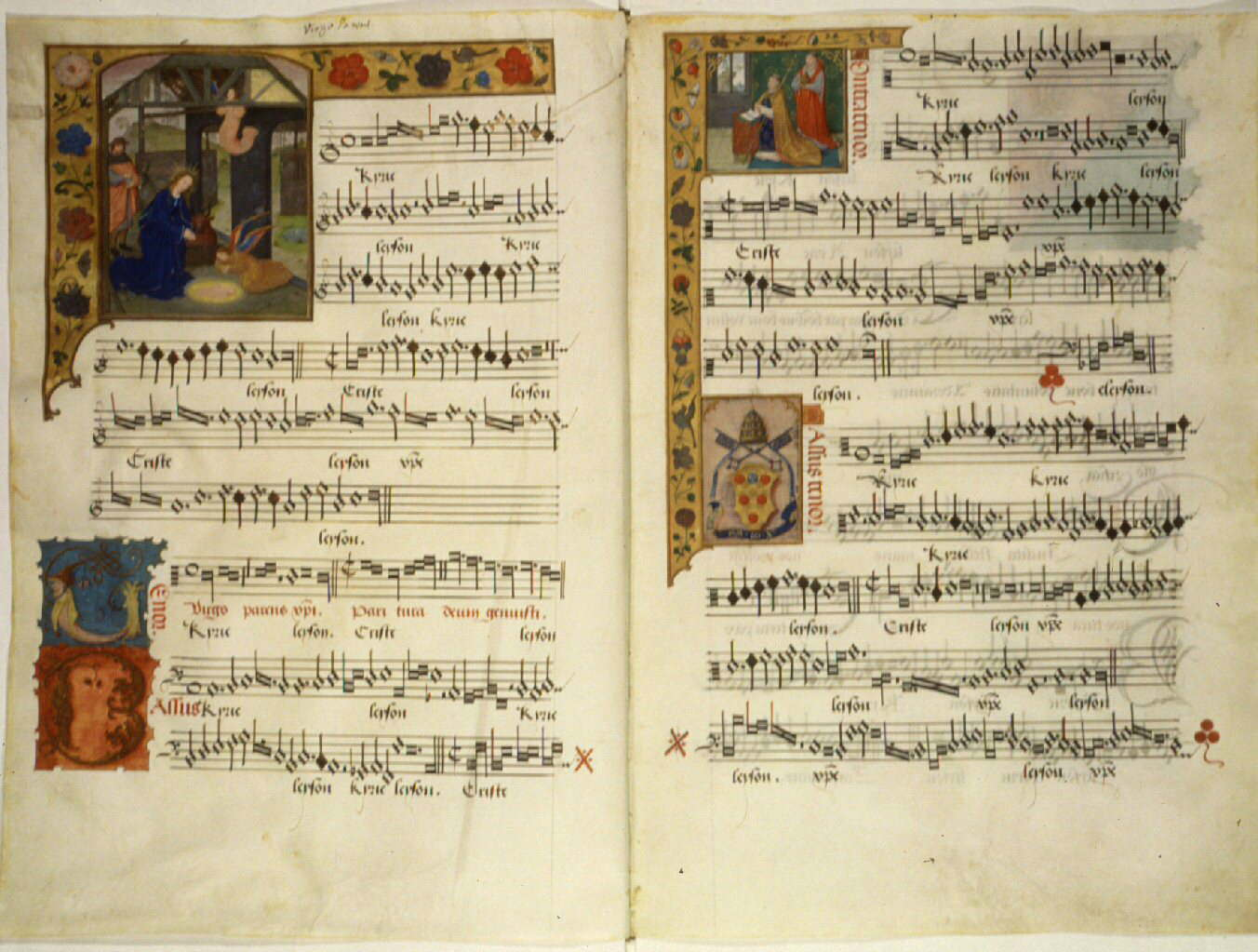
An illuminated copy of the Missa Virgo parens Christi by Jacobus Barbireau; composed in the late 15th century, copied in the early 16th century as part of a gift to Pope Leo X

Jacobus Barbireau (also Jacques or Jacob; also Barbirianus) (1455 – 7 August 1491) was a Franco-Flemish Renaissance composer from Antwerp. He was considered to be a superlative composer both by his contemporaries and by modern scholars; however, his surviving output is small, and he died young.

== Life ==
Until the 1960s, he was confused with another somewhat older composer named Barbingant. Barbireau was probably born in Antwerp, and both of his parents were citizens there. By 1482, he had attained the title of Master of Arts, so he likely went to university in the 1470s. He wanted to study with the humanist and musician Rodolphus Agricola, who was active at Ferrara in the 1470s and later Heidelberg, and several letters written by Agricola to Barbireau have survived; one of them gives useful clues about Barbireau's life. According to it, Barbireau was already active as a composer by 1484, and implies that his fame had not yet spread outside of his native Antwerp.

Barbireau may have been attached to the Church of Our Lady in Antwerp since childhood. Since 1482, the church was the center of his life. It is also probably the reason why it was impossible for him to study with Agricola. In 1484, succeeding Antoine de Vigne, he became Kapellmeister, a position he held until his death. Although Barbireau was registered in the account books of the church as singing master or magister choralum from 1487, he had probably held the post from as early as 1484. In 1485 as a schoolmaster, he paid a contribution to the Capellanía Our Lady of Nieuwwerk, a foundation created for singing teachers. At that time, the choir led by Barbireau consisted of twelve singers. Emperor Maximilian I evidently held him in high regard, and when Barbireau went to Buda in Hungary in 1490, Queen Beatrix also spoke highly of him.

Evidently his health was poor for about the last nine years of his life. He died in Antwerp, not long after returning from Hungary, on 7 August 1491. In his will, he designated as heirs the woman he married after 1487 and the daughter he had with her, Jacomyne Barbireau (born after 1487, died after 1525).

The death of the composer inspired the humanist Judocus Beyssel to write three epitaphs, in which he described Barbireau as "notabilissimus modulator" and laments the composer's untimely death.

== Music ==
The library of the cathedral in Antwerp was destroyed by religious fanatics in 1556, including probably most of Barbireau's music. Some, however, has survived, in sources such as the Chigi Codex. What has survived is of outstanding quality. "Barbireau shows a degree of contrapuntal polish and melodic-harmonic resourcefulness that puts him firmly on a par with such composers as Isaac and Obrecht."

Two masses have survived as well as a Kyrie for the Easter season, and a motet on texts from the Song of Songs, Osculetur me, for four voices. The mass for five voices, Missa virgo parens Christi, is a cantus firmus mass and has an unusual arrangement where the voices have divisi parts, indicating that at least ten actual voices would be required to sing it. In this composition the textural contrasts are high, with striking homophonic passages alternating dynamically with polyphonic, and with fast-moving parts weaving around the slower-moving parts. Also featured in this mass are alternating duos (bicinia) in a call-response fashion. The motet Osculetur me uses low voice tessituras reminiscent of Ockeghem.

Of his secular music, the song Een vroylic wesen, for three voices, became a 'hit' song all over Europe, appearing in numerous arrangements from places as far apart as Spain, Italy and England; Heinrich Isaac used it as the basis for his own Missa Frölich wesen. Three of his surviving secular songs were used as the basis for masses, both by Isaac and Jacob Obrecht.

== Works ==
=== Masses and mass movements ===
1. Missa Faulx perverse (4 voices)
2. Missa virgo parens Christi [Missa De venerabili sacramento] (5 voices)
3. Kyrie paschale (4 voices)

=== Motet ===
1. Osculetur me (4 voices)

=== Secular music ===
1. Ein frohlich wesen [Een vroylic wesen]
2. Gracioulx et biaulx
3. Scon lief

== See also ==
- List of Renaissance composers
- List of people from Antwerp
