= Missa prolationum =

Mass setting by Johannes Ockeghem

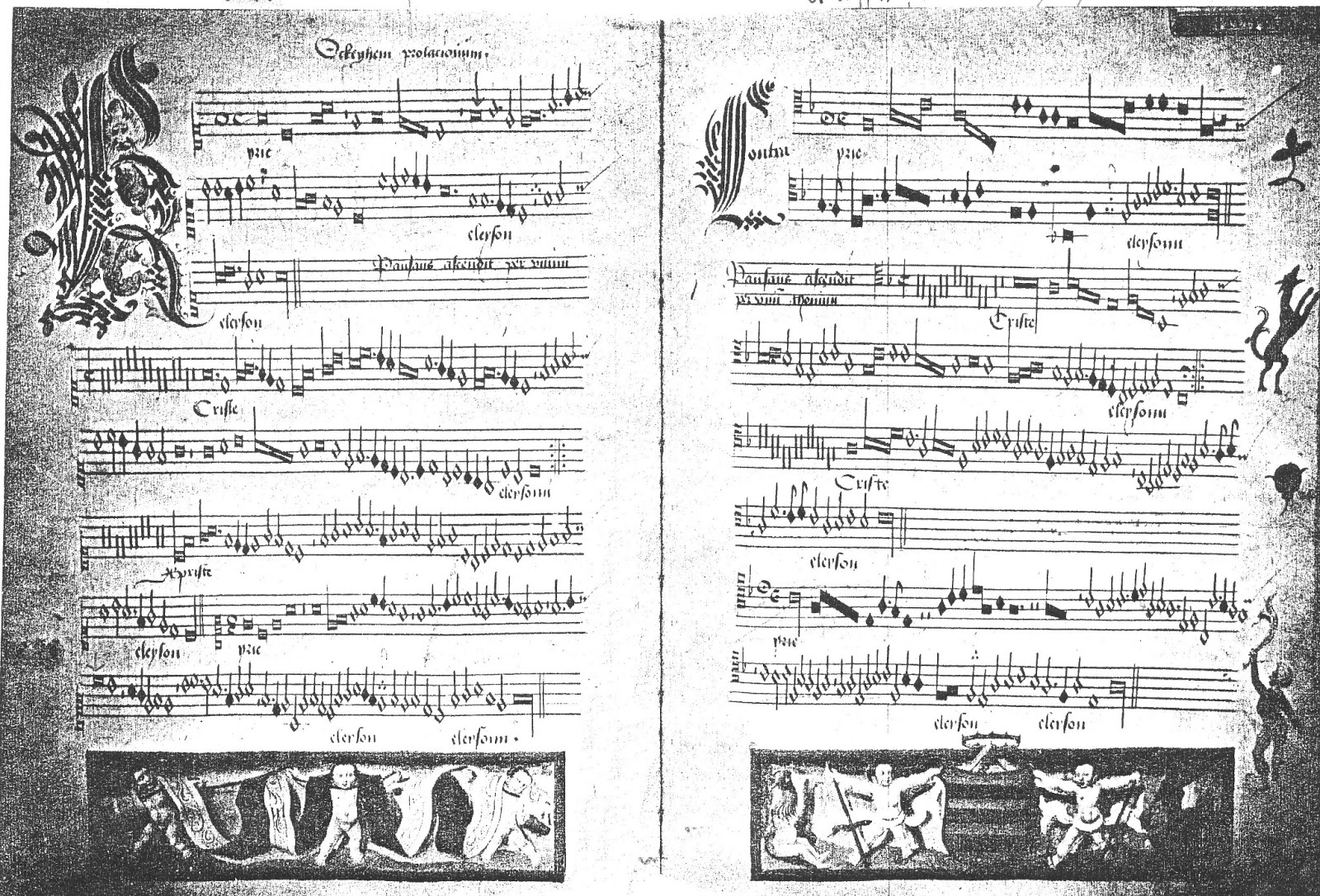
Manuscript page of the first "Kyrie"

The Missa prolationum is a musical setting of the Ordinary of the Mass by Johannes Ockeghem, dating from the second half of the 15th century. Based on freely written material probably composed by Ockeghem himself, and consisting entirely of mensuration canons, it has been called "perhaps the most extraordinary contrapuntal achievement of the fifteenth century", and was possibly the first multi-part work written with a unifying canonic principle for all its movements.

== Music ==
Beginning of the first "Kyrie", using all four mensurations in a twofold mensural canon between two pairs of voices. (full score;)

The mass is for four voices, and is in the usual parts:

1. Kyrie
2. Gloria
3. Credo
4. Sanctus and Benedictus
5. Agnus Dei (in three sections: I, II, III)

A typical performance takes 30 to 35 minutes.

Like Palestrina's "Missa Repleatur os meum" (Third Book of Masses, 1570) and the canons of J.S. Bach's Goldberg Variations more than two centuries later, the Missa prolationum uses progressive canon in all its movements. Most of the movements feature pairs of mensuration canons. The interval separating the two voices in each canon grows successively in each consecutive movement, beginning at the unison, proceeding to the second, then the third, and so forth, reaching the octave at the "Osanna" section in the Sanctus. The four voices each sing in a different mensuration. For instance, in the first "Kyrie", the four voices sing in the meters 2/2, 3/2, 6/4, and 9/4 respectively (in modern notation). Thus, the second voice, in 3/2, sings the same tune as the first voice, in 2/2, but half again as slowly, so the voices gradually pull apart. The same occurs between the second pair of voices, in 6/4 and 9/4 respectively. In the score, only one voice was written out for each canon, with the mensuration marks (approximately equivalent to a modern time signature) given alongside, so the singers would understand that they are to sing in those proportions, and thus at different speeds; in addition, the intervals between the voices are given in the score by the positions of the C clefs. What has so astonished musicians and listeners from Ockeghem's age to the present day is that he was able to accomplish this extraordinarily difficult feat.

Ockeghem was the first composer of canons at the second, third, sixth, and seventh (the "imperfect" intervals), and the Missa prolationum may have been the first work to employ them. Its format, with the interval of imitation expanding from the unison up to the octave, was used by Bach in the Goldberg Variations, but it is not known whether Bach knew Ockeghem's work (which was generally unavailable in the 18th century). Another unusual feature of this mass is that the melodies used for its canons were all apparently freely composed; none have been identified as from other sources. In Ockeghem's time, composers usually built masses on preexisting tunes such as Gregorian chant or even popular songs.

== Source and dating ==
There are two sources preserving the mass. One is the Chigi Codex (f.106v to 114r), which was copied for Philip I of Castile sometime between 1498 and 1503, shortly after Ockeghem's death. The other is the Vienna manuscript (Wien, Österreichische Nationalbibliothek, Handschriftensammlung, MS 11883, f.208r to 221r). The Missa prolationum's exact date of composition is not known, and there is no evidence other than what can be inferred from its internal characteristics, or from a comparison with other Ockeghem works that have tentative dates (Ockeghem's output is notoriously resistant to precise dating, even for a composer of the Renaissance; not only did he have an unusually long career, possibly spanning 60 active years as a composer, but there are few records tying specific pieces to events). No dates more precise than "mid-15th century" or "second half of 15th century" have been established for this piece.
