= Medici Codex =

Music book prepared for Pope Leo X

The Medici Codex of 1518 is a music book prepared for the Pope Leo X, the second son of Lorenzo the Magnificent of the Medici family, who was pope from 1513 to 1521.

The codex contains 53 motets by 21 composers, and was presented to Leo's nephew Lorenzo di Piero de' Medici, Duke of Urbino, at his wedding to the French princess Madeleine de La Tour d'Auvergne in 1518. The wedding was held on 2 May 1518 in Amboise, France. The book was given to the nuptial couple at their triumphant return to Florence on 8 September 1518.

Edward Lowinsky, in the three-volume facsimile edition (1968), proposed that Jean Mouton, a leading court composer for the French king, Francis I, was the editor. Ten motets by Jean Mouton were included in the Medici Codex.

The book also contains a tribute motet to Leo Gaude felix Florentia by Andreas de Silva, and motets by composers of the Franco-Flemish School, including Johannes de la Fage, Josquin des Prez, Pierrequin de Thérache, Adrian Willaert and Inviolata integra et casta es by the Italian Costanzo Festa. The most famous motet in this collection, Déporation de Ockeghem, based on a French poem by Jean Molinet, was a heartfelt lament on the composer Ockeghem's death in 1497.

== Editions ==
- The Medici Codex of 1518, 3 volumes, 1968

== Recordings ==
- In 2002 Finnish label Alba Records released a recording of thirteen of the motets by the Ring Ensemble.
- A recording of nine of the motets, and two others, was made in 2010 by Cappella Pratensis, conducted by Joshua Rifkin.
- A recording of twelve of the motets was made in 2012 by Rutgers Collegium Musicum, conducted by Andrew Kirkman.
