= Fors seulement =

French melody

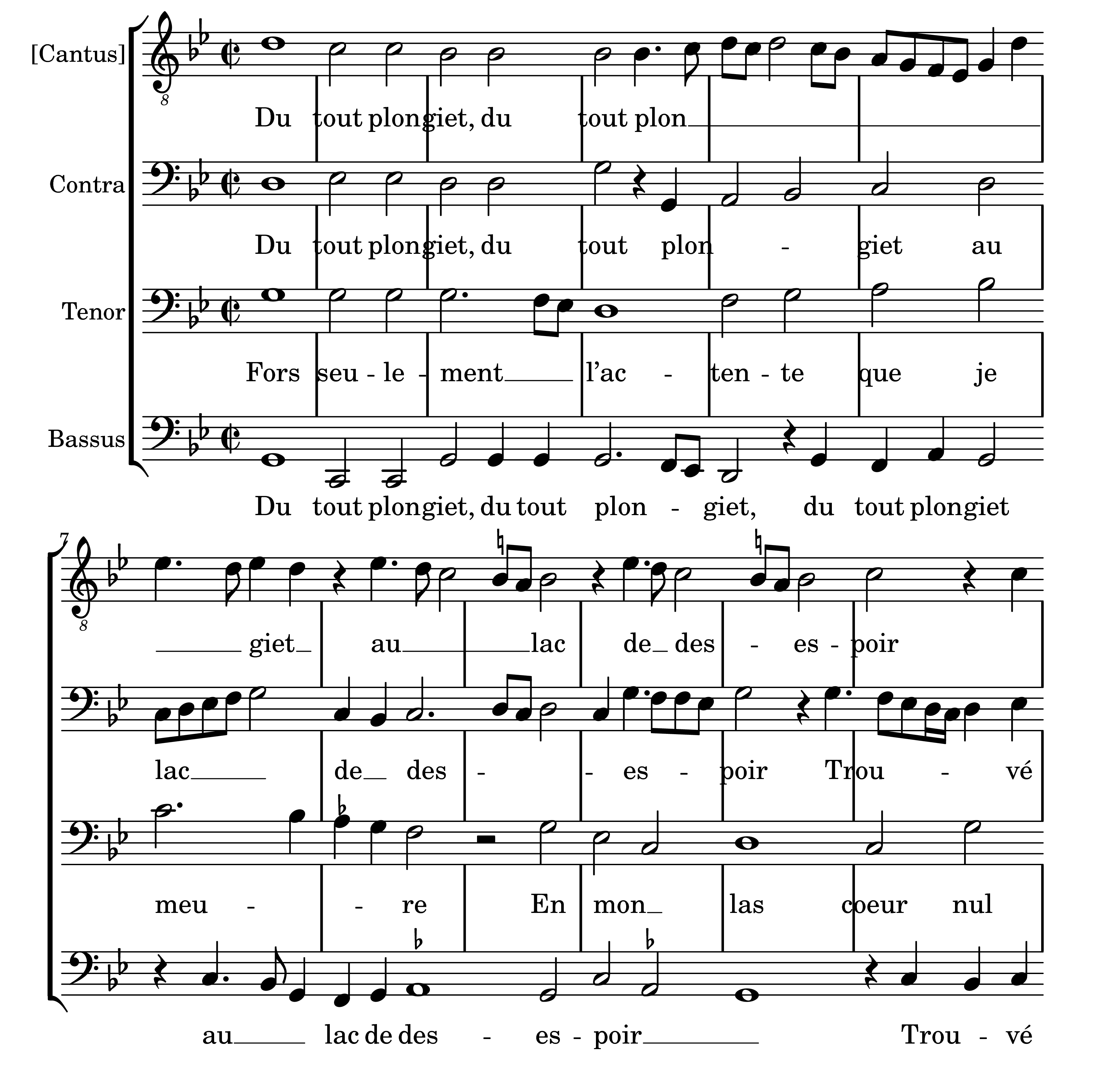
"Du tout plongiet – Fors seulement", Brumel's double setting

"Du tout plongiet – Fors seulement"
MIDI version

Fors seulement is a French chanson, popular as a basis for variations and as a cantus firmus. An early version, attributed to Johannes Ockeghem, is sometimes called Fors seulement l'attente to distinguish it from his similarly titled Fors seulement contre.

Brumel wrote a polytextual version, combining a tenor setting of Du tout plongiet with the words and superius from Ockeghem's Fors seulement l'attente for baritone.

== Lyrics ==
Fors seulement latente que je meure,
En mon las cueur, nul espoir ne demeure,
Car mon malheur si fort me tourmente
Qui n'est douleur que par vous je ne sente,
Pourceque suis de vous perdre bien seure.

Except in waiting for death
There dwells in my faint heart no hope,
For my woe torments me such
That I do not feel but sorrow from you,
For I am very sure of losing you.

== Versions and settings ==
Many versions of the chanson were produced including those by Johannes Ockeghem, Josquin des Prez, Pierre de La Rue, Matthaeus Pipelare, Johannes Ghiselin, Jacob Obrecht, Antoine Brumel, Jheronimus Vinders and Alexander Agricola.

Mass settings include those by Vinders, Ockeghem, Obrecht, Pipelare, and Carpentras.
