= Andreas de Silva =

Portuguese composer (fl. 1520)

Andreas de Silva (fl. 1520) was a composer, probably of Portuguese origin, who is known mainly from inclusion of five motets in the Medici Codex. Now attributed to de Silva is a madrigal Che sentisti Madonna, misattributed to Verdelot in 1537. Aspects of his compositional style suggest musical training in Spain, France, and northern Italy. He worked under the patronage of the Medici family and was employed by Pope Leo X in Rome, and wrote the motet Gaude felix Florentia for the Pope's coronation. In 1519 and 1520 his name was recorded as the cantor et compositor of the papal chapel and as the cantor secretus of the Pope's private chapel. The last record of him was a payment by the Duke of Mantua in 1522, though other sources suggest he was living in Italy by the end of the decade.

While not much about De Silva is known, it is clear that he had quite an influence on 16th century music practices. In 1567 Cosimo Bartoli, in his Ragionamenti accademici, described him as a worthy successor to Josquin and as a composer "who taught the world how music should be written." Five of his motets were parodied by Arcadelt, Francesco Cellavenia, Lupus Italius, and Palestrina. His works showed a mix of originality and traditional technique, with many of his masses following the standard cantus firmus style. His mass La mi sol fa mi is an example of a traditional solmization technique. His compositional style served as a bridge between the late 15th century Netherlandish style, exemplified by Josquin, and the more modern school.

== Recordings ==
- 5 motets on Le Divin Arcadelt: Candlemas in Renaissance Rome Arcadelt: Missa ‘Ave Regina caelorum’. Hodie beata virgo Maria. Pater noster. Palestrina: Senex Puerum Portabat. Diffusa est gratia. Silva, A: Ave Regina caelorum. Inviolata, integra et casta es Maria. Chant: Suscepimus, Deus (Introit). Suscepimus, Deus (Gradual). Nunc dimittis (Tract). Responsum accepit Simeon (Communio). Musica Contexta with The English Cornett and Sackbut Ensemble Chandos Classics 2011
- Motet: "Nigra Sum" on "Palestrina Masses" by The Tallis Scholars Gimell CDGIM 003 1996

== Works ==
=== Masses and mass movements ===
- Missa "Adieu mes amors"
- Missa "Angelus ad pastores ait"
- Missa "Joli maronier"
- Missa "La mi sol fa mi"
- Missa "Tu es pastor ovium"
- Magnificat II. toni

=== Motets ===
- Alma Redemptoris mater
- Ave ancilla Trinitatis
- Ave regina caelorum, mater regis angelorum
- Ave regina caelorum, ave domina angelorum
- Confitemini Domino
- Contristamur Domine
- Crux clavis coronae spinarum
- De ore prudentis
- Gaude felix Florentia
- Illumina oculos meos
- In illo tempore loquente Jesu
- In te Domine speravi
- Intonuit de caelo Dominus
- Inviolata integra et casta es Maria
- Inviolata integra et casta es Maria
- Judica me Deus
- Laetare nova Sion
- Laetatus sum in his
- Nesciens mater virgo virum
- Nigra sum sed formosa
- O felix desidium
- Omnis pulchritudo Domino
- O regem caeli
- O virgo benedicta
- Puer natus est nobis
- Recordata est Jerusalem
- Regina caeli, 4vv
- Regina caeli, 6vv
- Si bona suscepimus
- Surrexit Pastor Bonus
- Tota pulchra es Maria
- Virgo carens criminibus

=== Secular ===
- Fors seulement
