= Asteria Medievale =

American vocal ensemble

Asteria was a vocal ensemble founded in 2003 that specialized in historically informed performances of medieval and Renaissance music, based on extensive research with original source material. It was based in Brooklyn, New York. The act consisted of Sylvia Rhyne, soprano, and Eric Redlinger, tenor and lute player. Their repertoire is anchored in 15th century chanson, including noted composers such as Du Fay and Antoine Busnoys.

Winners of the 2004 Unicorn Prize for best North American early music ensemble specializing in medieval and renaissance music, they toured extensively in Europe and the Americas. They recorded 4 CDs of polyphonic chansons for the Magnatune label.

Asteria was fiscally-sponsored by GEMS, a 501(c)(3) organization dedicated to the promotion and advancement of early music in New York City.

== Discography ==
- Le souvenir de vous me tue (2004) UPC: 643157337928
- Soyes loyal (2006) UPC: 643157378396
- Un tres doulx regard (2009) UPC: 859701552819
- For the love of Jacqueline (2012) UPC: 859701552819
