= Quintus (vocal music) =

The Latin word quintus, also quinta or quinta vox, refers to the fifth voice in addition to the superius, altus, tenor and bassus in a piece of vocal polyphony. In Baroque vocal music, this fifth voice was added to the principal part and then given to the tenor. The word was particularly used for printed partbooks of five-voice music, where the "quintus" melody might well be for different voices like the discantus or even the contratenor, in addition to the usual four.

By overlaying voices in different planes, the compositional style of the seventeenth century was enriched with polyphonic sounds, expanding itself both to the low as well as the high pitch. The prevailing three or four voices of the latter half of the fourteenth and the first half of the fifteenth centuries, which are almost frequently intertwined between them, already in the latter half of the sixteenth century were preferred by four or five, or even more voices, by the addition of a quintus, also called vagans, and a sextus playing the part of a second cantus, normally in the soprano or mezzo-soprano range.

== See also ==
- Voice type
