= Prolation canon =

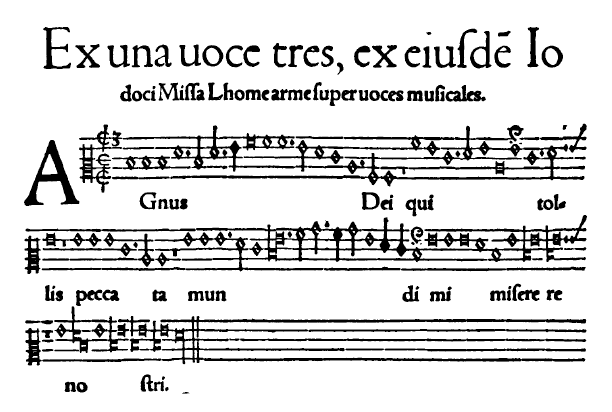
Facsimile of Dodekachordon, Glareanus, p 442

In music, a prolation canon (also called a mensuration canon or proportional canon) is a type of canon, a musical composition wherein the main melody is accompanied by one or more imitations of that melody in other voices. Not only do the voices sing or play the same melody, they do so at different speeds (or prolations, a mensuration term that dates to the medieval and Renaissance eras). Accompanying voices may enter either simultaneously or successively.

If voices extend the rhythmic values of the leader (for example, by doubling all note values), a procedure known as augmentation, the resulting canon can be called an augmentation canon or canon by augmentation (canon per augmentationem) or sloth canon (recalling the slow movement of the sloth). Conversely, if they reduce the note values in diminution, it can be called a diminution canon or canon by diminution (canon per diminutionem).

== Examples ==
Prolation canons are among the most difficult canons to write, and are relatively rare in the repertory, though they are most common in the early Renaissance and from the 20th century to the present. Examples of prolation canons from the Renaissance include Le Ray Au Soleyl by Johannes Ciconia (late 14th century); the entire Missa prolationum by Johannes Ockeghem (mid-15th century), in which each separate section of the mass explores a different prolation (or different gap between entries and relative speed of each voice); the Agnus Dei from the Missa L'homme armé super voces musicales by Josquin des Prez (late 15th century); and the Agnus Dei from the Missa L'homme armé by Pierre de la Rue (early 16th century).

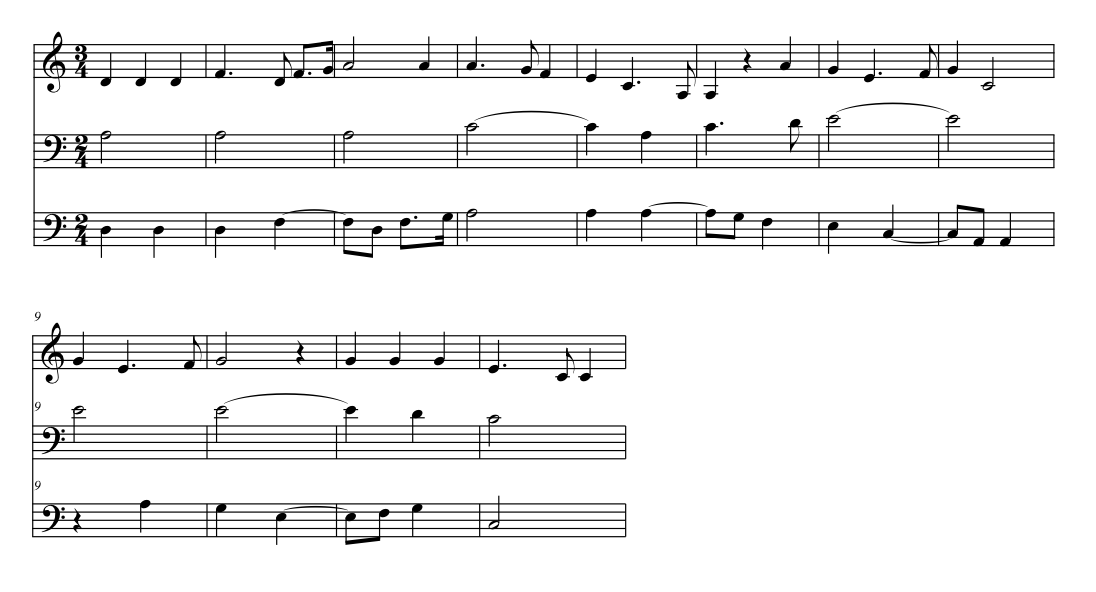
An example of a prolation canon. Agnus Dei from Missa l'homme armé super voces musicales, by Josquin des Prez

In this example, the first 12 bars of the Agnus Dei II of the earlier of the two masses Josquin wrote based on the L'homme armé tune, each voice sings the same music, but at different speeds. The top voice is barred in 3/4 meter for clarity. The slowest voice is the one in the middle. The lowest voice sings the same music at twice the speed of the slowest, and the highest voice sings the same music at three times the speed of the slowest. In the original score, only one part is given: a notation over the single line of music indicates the three prolations to be used, and a second notation over the line indicates where each voice should end if sung correctly.

Johann Sebastian Bach is known for his Canon a 4 per Augmentationem et Diminutionem, the last in a set of 14 canons written as an appendix to the Goldberg Variations.

In the 20th century, one such canon is the Cantus in Memoriam Benjamin Britten by Arvo Pärt (1976). Additionally, Larry Polansky has written numerous four-voice prolation canons whose melodies are permutations of a limited number of elements, and Mark Alburger, in Immortality from San Rafael News, directly maps a new melody into the framework of the aforementioned Josquin. A particularly striking example of prolation canon occurs twice in the opening movement of Shostakovich's Symphony No. 15 (1971), first in the strings (Rehearsal Figure 27) and later in the woodwind at Rehearsal Figure 47. A more recent example of a prolation canon in contemporary music is rindenmotette (2011) by Austrian composer Klaus Lang.
