= Missa cuiusvis toni =

Mass setting by Johannes Ockeghem

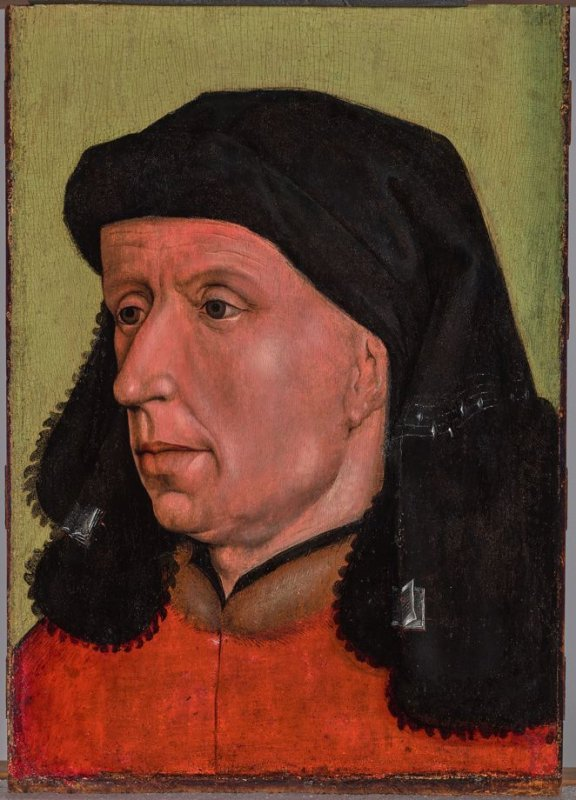
Speculative posthumous portrait of Johannes Ockeghem

Missa Cuiusvis Toni (lit. “Mass in any mode”) is a four-part musical setting of the Ordinary of the Mass by the 15th-century composer Johannes Ockeghem. It is found in late-century manuscripts, including the Chigi codex (c. 1498–1508), and was published in 1539, 42 years after the composer's death in 1497.

The work's name reflects the fact that it may be sung in any of the Dorian, Phrygian, Lydian or Mixolydian modes. This is made possible by writing the music without clefs or key signatures, allowing the singers to assume those suited to the chosen mode. This unusual and complex idea has led the musicologist Fabrice Fitch to describe the mass as "the work chiefly responsible for Ockeghem's reputation as an artful pedant".

Although Leeman L. Perkins describes the Missa Cuiusvis Toni as "not unduly complex in its contrapuntal style", to compose a work to be singable in any of the four modes is a considerable technical challenge, because the cadences suitable for the Phrygian mode are unsuitable for the other modes, and vice versa. Ockeghem's solution is to write cadences that today would be called plagal cadences. (Note: Cadences in Phrygian mode cannot have the fifth degree of the scale (B♮ in E Phrygian) in the bass of the penultimate chord, as this would give rise to a diminished triad. To solve this, Ockeghem uses the fourth degree of the scale in the bass at these points.) According to the musicologist Richard Turbet, this makes the Mass easiest to sing in the Phrygian mode and successively more difficult in the Mixolydian, Lydian and Dorian modes. Both Turbet and Fitch believe that the work was conceived for the Phrygian mode and then adapted for the other modes.

== Recordings ==
- Missa Cuiusvis Toni, æon, ÆCD 0753 (2 CDs; 2007), performed by Ensemble Musica Nova, Lucien Kandel. First recording of the four versions. Ed. Gérard Geay.
