= Johannes Pullois =

Franco-Flemish composer

Johannes Pullois (numerous variant spellings of his name include Pillays, Pilloys, Pylois, Pyloys, Pyllois, Puilloys, Puylloys, Puyllois) (died 23 August 1478) was a Franco-Flemish composer of the Renaissance, active in both the Low Countries and Italy. He was one of the early generation of composers to carry the Franco-Flemish polyphonic style from its home region in the Netherlands to Italy.

He was probably born in Pulle, near Antwerp, but nothing is known about his life until he became zangmeester (singing master) at the church of Our Lady in Antwerp in 1443. He unsuccessfully auditioned with Philip the Good for the Burgundian court chapel, but was not accepted for a position. He then went to Rome in 1447 where he sang in the papal chapel until 1468. He returned to Antwerp, becoming residential canon at the same church at which he had worked in the 1440s, and he died there in 1478. During his career he was a colleague of both Johannes Philibert and Johannes Ockeghem.

== Music and influence ==
One complete cyclic mass has survived, a Missa sine nomine, for three voices; most likely dating from the 1450s, it is one of the earliest cyclic masses to be written on the continent. It shows such influence of English music that it has been mistaken for the work of an anonymous English composer. The mass displays a complex transmission pattern, which has confused its dating and provenance.

Pullois also wrote a motet for the Christmas season Flos de spina, which is similar stylistically to works by Ockeghem, and may have been written during his time in Italy. One other motet, Victime paschali laudes, and three sacred contrafacta of secular songs have survived.

He also wrote 14 secular songs (including the three with contrafactum texts) which appear in various sources from Italy as well as Germany.

== Works ==
=== Masses and mass fragments ===
1. Missa sine nomine (3 voices)
2. Gloria (4 voices)

=== Motets ===
1. Flos de spina (4 voices)
2. Globus igneus (Contrafactum of "Quelque cose", 3 voices)
3. O beata Maria (Contrafactum of "De ma dame", 3 voices; not attributed to Pullois in the original)
4. Resone unice genito (Contrafactum of "Puis que Fortune", 3 voices)
5. Victime paschali laudes, (3 voices)

=== Secular ===
1. De ma dame (rondeau, 3 voices)
2. He n'esse pas (rondeau, 3 voices)
3. Je ne puis (3 voices: no text)
4. La bonté du Saint Esperit (ballade, 3 voices)
5. Le serviteur (3 voices)
6. Les larmes, (3 voices: no text)
7. Op eenen tijd, 3 voices (not attributed to Pullois in the original)
8. Pour prison, (3 voices: no text)
9. Pour toutes fleurs, (rondeau, 3 voices)
10. Puisque fortune (rondeau, 3 voices)
11. Quelque cose (rondeau, 3 voices)
12. Quelque langage, (rondeau, 3 voices)
13. Se ung bien peu, (rondeau, 3 voices)
14. So lanc so meer, (3 voices, attribution uncertain)
