= Barbingant =

French composer

Barbingant (maybe Pierre; fl. c. 1460) was a French composer to whom is attributed the earliest known surviving parody mass, a three-voice mass based on the virelai "Terriblement suis fortunée". Barbignant's chanson "Au travail suis" was the base of a parody mass by Ockeghem. His works are included in the Opera Omnia of the slightly later composer Jacob Barbireau, choirmaster at Antwerp, but the two composers are separated in musicology after 1960.

Scott Metcalfe, in his programme notes for a concert that included the chanson Au travail suis and Ockeghem's mass setting, notes that Guillaume Crétin’s Déploration...sur le trépas de Jean Okeghem includes Barbingant in the choir of illustrious musicians who welcome Ockeghem into heaven.
