= Johannes de la Fage =

Johannes de la Fage (fl. 1520) was a composer of the Franco-Flemish school.

His works include motets in the Medici Codex, and a motet, "Elisabeth Zachariae."
