= Chigi codex =

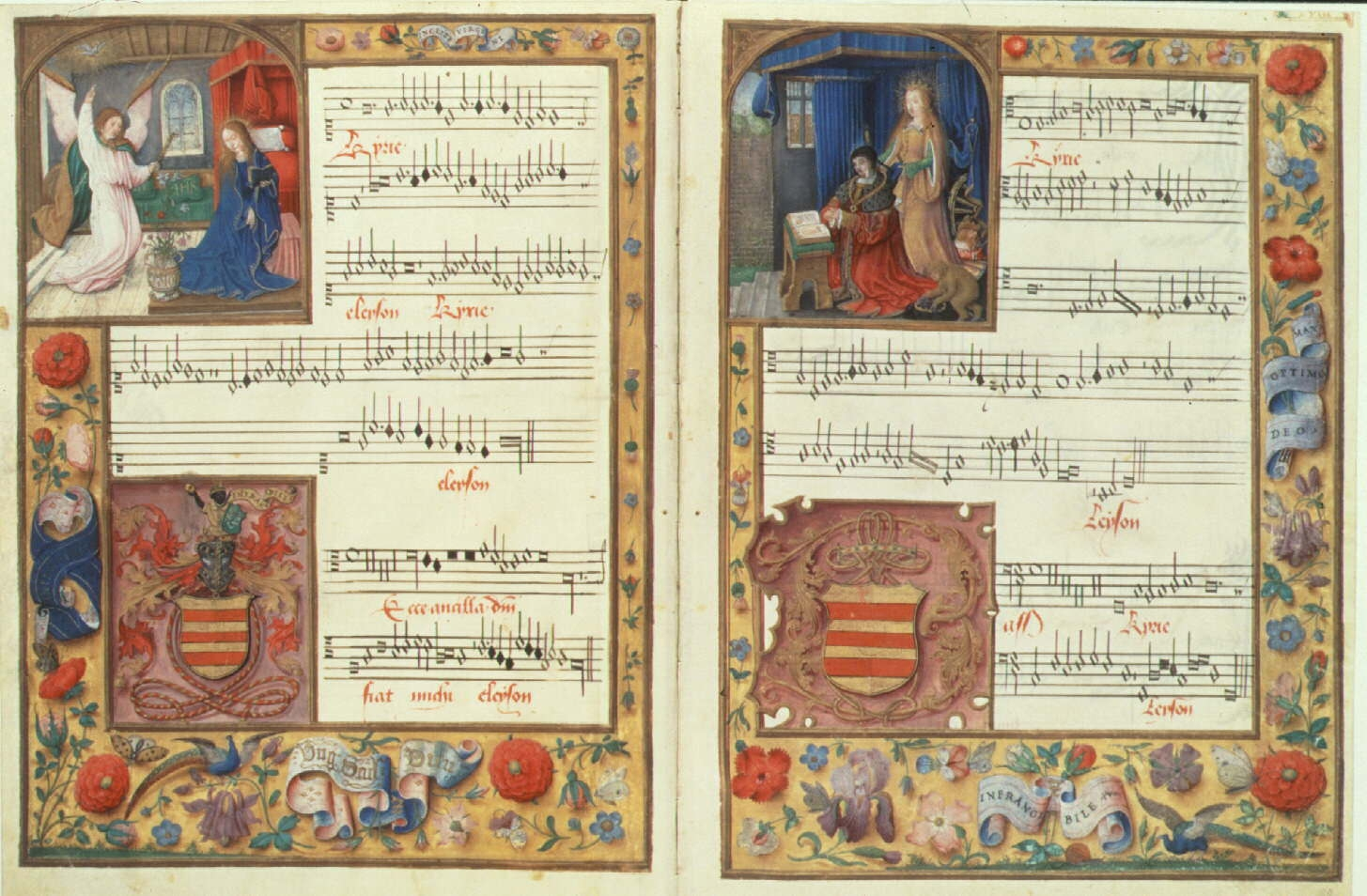
An illuminated opening from the Chigi Codex featuring the Kyrie of Ockeghem's Missa Ecce ancilla Domini. Late 15th century. Vatican Library, Chig. C. VIII 234, music09, NB.03, ff.19v–20r.

The Chigi codex is a music manuscript originating in Flanders. According to Herbert Kellman, it was created sometime between 1498 and 1503, probably at the behest of Philip I of Castile. It is currently housed in the Vatican Library under the call number Chigiana, C. VIII. 234.

The Chigi codex is notable not only for its vivid and colorful illuminations, which were probably done in Ghent in the workshop of the Master of the Hortulus Animae, but also for its very clear and legible musical notation. It contains a nearly complete catalogue of the polyphonic masses by Johannes Ockeghem and a collection of five relatively early L'homme armé mass settings, including Ockeghem's.

Several folia, comprising eight works, were added to the original codex at some point after the manuscript's original creation. These are indicated as such in the list below.

The two coats of arms in the page from Missa Ecce ancilla Domini refer to the Fernández de Córdoba family.

A facsimile of the Chigi Codex in seven parts is available to view online, in the International Music Scores Library Project, or IMSLP. The Petrucci Music Library/IMSLP is run by Project Petrucci LLC in the U.S.A.

== Contents ==
The manuscript contains the following works (this list is distilled from that found in Kellman's article):

- Alexander Agricola
  - Missa In myne zyn (without Kyrie)
- Antoine Brumel
  - Missa L'homme armé
- Antoine Busnois
  - Missa L'homme armé
- Antoine de Févin
  - Sancta Trinitas unus Deus (addition)
- Gaspar van Weerbeke
  - Stabat mater
- Heinrich Isaac
  - Angeli archangeli
- Jacobus Barbireau
  - Missa Virgo parens Christi (without Agnus Dei)
- Jean Mouton
  - Quis dabit oculis (addition; no attribution)
- Johannes Ockeghem
  - Ave Maria (addition)
  - Intemerata Dei Mater
  - Missa Mi-mi
  - Missa Ecce ancilla Domini
  - Missa L'homme armé
  - Missa Fors seulement (Kyrie, Gloria and Credo only)
  - Missa sine nomine (Kyrie, Gloria and Credo only)
  - Missa Ma maistresse (Kyrie and Gloria)
  - Missa Caput
  - Missa De plus en plus
  - Missa Au travail suis
  - Missa cuiusvis toni
  - Missa Prolationum
  - Missa quinti toni
  - Missa pro defunctis
- Johannes Regis
  - Celsi tonantis
  - Clangat plebs
  - Lauda Sion Salvatorem
  - Lux solempnis (no attribution)
  - O admirabile commercium
- Josquin des Prez
  - Missa L'homme armé sexti toni (Kyrie, Gloria and Credo only)
  - Stabat mater
- Loyset Compère
  - Ave Maria (addition)
  - Missa L'homme armé
  - Sancte Michael ora pro nobis (addition; no attribution)
  - Sile frago ac rerum (no attribution)
- Pierre de la Rue
  - Credo Sine nomine
  - Missa Almana
- Anonymous works
  - Ave rosa speciosa
  - Regina coeli (addition)
  - Vidi aquam (addition)
  - one motet without text
