= Antoine Busnois =

French composer and poet (c. 1430–1492)

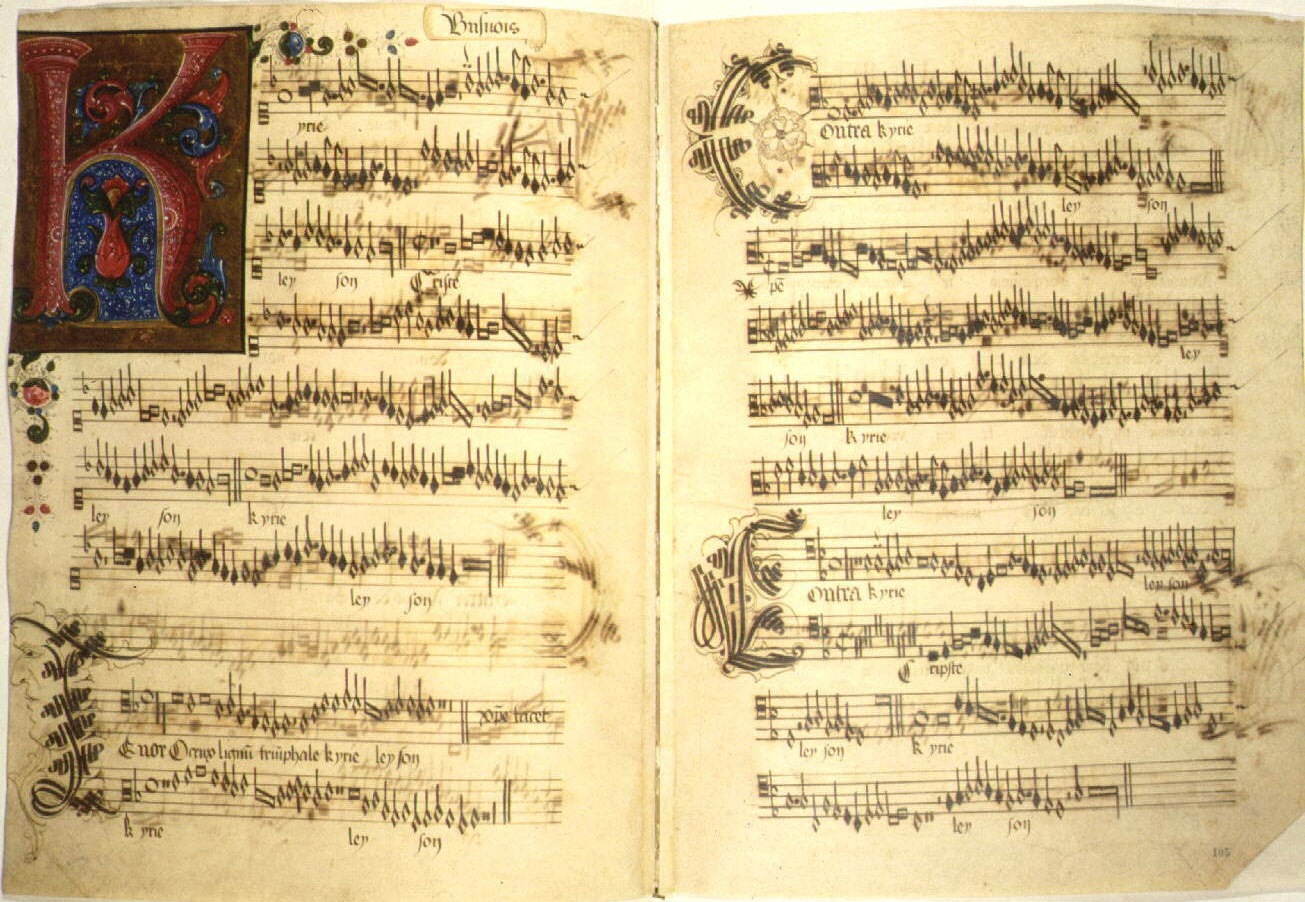
Manuscript of Missa O Crux Lignum, a Mass by Busnois. The date is not certain but probably mid-15th century.

Antoine Busnois (also Busnoys; c. 1430 – before 6 November 1492) was a French composer, singer and poet of early Renaissance music. Busnois and colleague Johannes Ockeghem were the leading European composers of the second half the 15th century and central figures of the early Franco-Flemish School.

While also noted as a composer of motets and other sacred music, he was one of the most renowned 15th-century composers of secular polyphonic chansons. Between Guillaume Du Fay and Claudin de Sermisy, Busnois was the most prolific and important French composer of songs.

== Life and career ==
The details of Busnois's early life are largely conjectural, and nothing is certain. He was probably from the vicinity of Béthune in the Pas-de-Calais, possibly the hamlet of Busnes, to which his name seems to refer. He may have been related to the aristocratic family of Busnes; in particular, a Philippe de Busnes, canon of Notre-Dame in Lens, could have been a relative. He clearly received an excellent musical education, probably at a church choir school somewhere in northern or central France. An aristocratic origin may explain his early association with the French royal court: as early as the 1450s references to him appear there, and in 1461 he was a chaplain at Tours. That he was not entirely a man of peace is indicated by a petition for absolution he filed in Tours, dated 28 February 1461, in which he admitted to being part of a group that beat up a priest "to the point of bloodshed", not once but five times. While in a state of anathema he was foolhardy enough to celebrate Mass although he was not an ordained priest, an act which got him excommunicated until Pope Pius II pardoned him.

He moved from the cathedral to the collegiate church of St. Martin, also in Tours, where he became a subdeacon in 1465. Johannes Ockeghem was treasurer at that institution, and the two composers seem to have known each other well. Later in 1465 Busnois moved to Poitiers, where he not only became master of the choirboys but managed to attract a flood of talented singers from the entire region; by this time his reputation as singing teacher, scholar and composer seems to have spread widely. But he departed in 1466 just as suddenly as he came for no known reason, and the former master was given his old job back. He then moved to Burgundy.

In 1467, at the Burgundian court, Busnois joined Hayne van Ghizeghem and Adrien Basin as "chantre et valet de chambre". One Busnois motet, In hydraulis, was dedicated to Count Charles before Charles became Duke on 15 June. Charles loved music, rewarded Busnois, and later became known as Charles the Bold for his fierce, sometimes reckless military adventurism. Beyond singing and composing for Charles, Busnois and Ghizeghem joined him on military campaigns. In 1475, Busnois was at the siege of Neuss in Germany. In 1477, he survived (or missed) the disastrous Battle of Nancy, where Charles was killed and the Burgundian expansion contained.

Busnois remained in the employ of the Burgundian court until 1482, but nothing exact is known about his exploits between then and the year of his death. At the time of his death, in 1492, he was employed by the church of St. Sauveur in Bruges.

== Music ==
Quant ce vendra
Hear a performance of Busnoys' rondeau Quant ce vendra performed by ASTERIA

Busnois' contemporary reputation was immense; he was probably the best-known musician in Europe between Guillaume Dufay and Johannes Ockeghem. He wrote sacred and secular music. Of the former, two cantus firmus Masses and eight motets have survived, while many others were most likely lost. He set the Marian antiphon Regina coeli several times. Stylistically, his music can be considered a midpoint between the simplicity and homophonic textures of Dufay and Binchois, and the soon-to-be pervasive imitative counterpoint of Josquin and Gombert. He used imitation only occasionally but skillfully, created smooth and singable melodic lines and had a strong feeling for triadic sonorities, anticipating 16th-century practice.

According to Pietro Aron, Busnois may have been the composer of the famous tune L'homme armé, one of the most widely distributed melodies of the Renaissance and the one more often used than any other as a cantus firmus in Mass composition. Whether or not he wrote the first Mass based on L'homme armé, his was by far the most influential; Obrecht's setting, for example, closely parallels that of Busnois, and even Dufay's quotes from it directly. Richard Taruskin attempts to prove that Busnois' was the model later L'homme armé masses were based upon through a study of the composer's numerological symbology within the work, and by demonstrating that Dufay and others were emulating (or paying homage) to this aspect, among others. David Fallows points out that the complexity of the Busnois mass may indicate that he was actually borrowing from Dufay. Busnois may even be the composer of a cycle of six Masses all based on the same tune, found in Naples, on the basis of stylistic comparison.

But Busnois' polyphonic chansons (French secular songs) are the works on which his reputation mainly rests. Most are rondeaux, but some are bergerettes; many of them achieved the status of popular songs, and some were perhaps based on other popular songs which are now lost. He probably wrote the words for almost all of his chansons. Some of his tunes were recycled as cantus firmus for Masses composed more than a generation after his death, for instance Fortuna desperata (which was used both by Obrecht and Josquin), though this attribution is controversial. (Note: The song survives anonymously in most sources. The attribution to Busnois, which exists in a single late source, is not generally accepted.) An unusual chanson is Terrible dame, which is not only an antiphonal dialogue (unique in the chanson literature) but has an Old French title requiring no special skill to translate.

While most of Busnois's secular songs are set to French words, at least two employ Italian texts and one is in Flemish. Most are for three voices, although there are a few for four.

== Works ==
=== Certain attributions ===
==== Masses ====
1. Missa L'homme armé;
2. Missa O crux lignum;
3. Patrem Vilayge.

==== Motets and magnificats ====
1. Ad coenam agni providi;
2. Alleluia, verbum caro factum est;
3. Anima mea liquefacta est / Stirps Jesse;
4. Anthoni usque limina;
5. Asperges me (lost);
6. Conditor alme siderum;
7. Gaude coelestis domina;
8. In hydraulis;
9. Lamentation on the death of Guillaume Dufay (probably written in 1474, lost);
10. Magnificat sexti toni;
11. Noel, noel;
12. Regina caeli (I);
13. Regina caeli (II);
14. Victimae paschali laudes.

==== Secular music ====
1. Acordes moy;
2. Advegne que advenir pourra;
3. Amours nous traicte / Je m'en vois;
4. A qui vens tu tes coquilles;
5. Au gré de mes iculx;
6. A une dame;
7. Au povre par necessité;
8. A vous, sans autre;
9. Bel acueil;
10. Bone chére;
11. Ce n’est pas moy;
12. C'est bien maleur;
13. C'est vous en qui;
14. Con tutta gentileça;
15. Corps digne / Dieu quel mariage;
16. Cy dit benedicite;
17. En soustenant;
18. En tous les lieux;
19. En voyant sa dame;
20. Esaint-il merci;
21. Faictes de moy;
22. Faulx mesdisans;
23. Fortuna desperata?
24. (O) Fortune, trop tu es dure;
25. Ha que ville;
26. In myne zynn;
27. Ja que lui ne;
28. J'ay mayns de bien;
29. J'ay pris amours tout au rebours;
30. Je m'esbaïs de vous;
31. Je ne demande aultre degré;
32. Je ne demande lialté;
33. Je ne puis vivre ainsi;
34. Joye me fuit;
35. Laissez dangier;
36. L'autrier la pieça /En l'ombre du buissonet / Trop suis jonette;
37. L'autrier que passa;
38. Le corps s'en va;
39. Le monde a tel;
40. Ma damoiselle;
41. Maintes femmes;
42. Ma plus qu'assez;
43. Ma tres souveraine princesse;
44. M'a vostre cueur;
45. Mon mignault / Gracieuse, playsant;
46. Mon seul et sangle souvenir;
47. On a grant mal / On est bien malade;
48. Pour entretenir mes amours;
49. Pucellotte;
50. Quant j'ay au cueur;
51. Quant vous me ferez;
52. Quelque povre homme;
53. Quelque povre homme;
54. Resjois toy terre de France / Rex pacificus;
55. Seule a par moy;
56. Soudainementmon cueur;
57. Terrible dame;
58. Une filleresse / S'il y a compagnion / Vostre amour;
59. Ung grand povtre homme;
60. Ung plus que tous;
61. Vostre beauté / Vous marchez;
62. Vostre gracieuse acointance.

=== Conjectural attributions ===
==== Masses ====
1. Missa L'Ardent desir;
2. Missa L'homme armé (I);
3. Missa L'homme armé (II);
4. Missa L'homme armé (III);
5. Missa L'homme armé (IV);
6. Missa L'homme armé (V);
7. Missa L'homme armé (VI) (these six Masses from Naples, attributed to Busnois from stylistic similarities);
8. Missa sine nomine;
9. Missa Quant ce viendra.

==== Magnificats and motets ====
1. Magnificat octavi toni;
2. Magnificat secundi toni;
3. Incomprehensibilia / Preter rerum ordinem.

=== Conflicting attributions ===
1. Amours, amours, amours;
2. Amours fait moult / Il est de binne heure né /Tant que nostre argent dura;
3. Cent mile escus;
4. Et qui la dira;
5. J'ay bien choisi;
6. Il sera pour vous canbatu / L'homme armé;
7. Je ne fay plus;
8. Je suis venu;
9. Le serviteur;
10. Quant ce vendra (attributed to Busnoys in Dijon MS 517);
11. Sans avoir (‚S' amours vous fiu' or 'Malagrota');
12. Se brief puis.
