= Cantus firmus =

Pre-existing melody forming the basis of a polyphonic composition

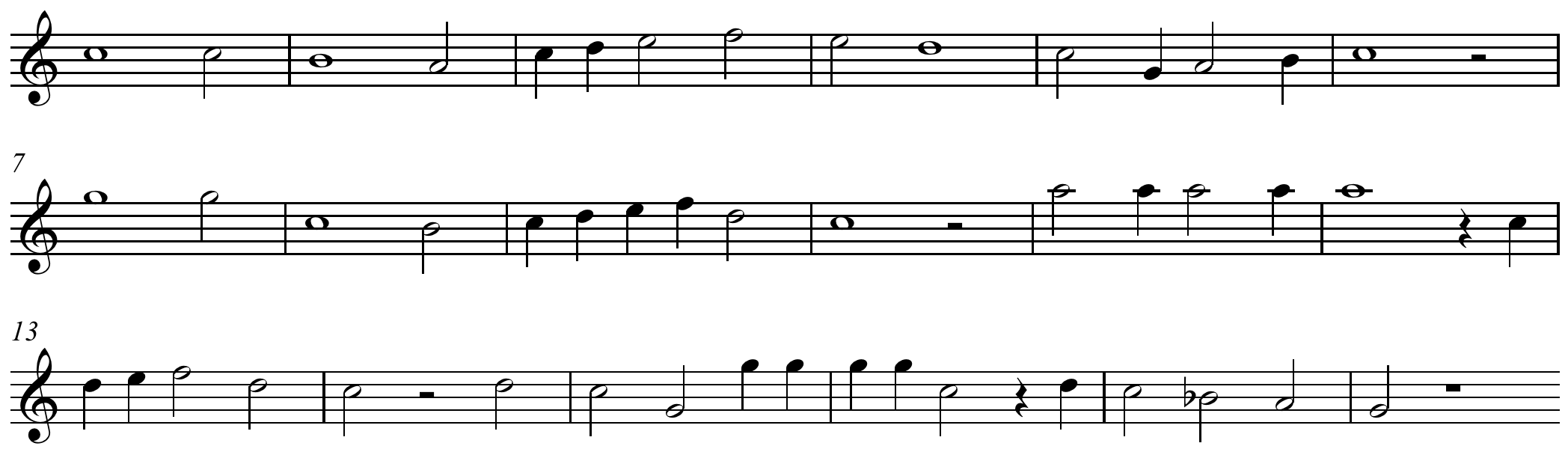
Dufay – mass cantus firmus, derived from "Se la face ay pale".

In music, a cantus firmus ("fixed melody") is a pre-existing melody forming the basis of a polyphonic composition.

The plural of this Latin term is cantus firmi, although the corrupt form canti firmi (resulting from the grammatically incorrect treatment of cantus as a second- rather than a fourth-declension noun) can also be found. The Italian is often used instead: canto fermo (and the plural in Italian is canti fermi).

== History ==
The term first appears in theoretical writings early in the 13th century (e.g., Boncampagno da Signa, Rhetorica novissima, 1235). The earliest polyphonic compositions almost always involved a cantus firmus, typically a Gregorian chant, although by convention the term is not applied to music written before the 14th century. The earliest surviving polyphonic compositions, in the Musica enchiriadis (around 900 AD), contain the chant in the top voice, and the newly composed part underneath; however, this usage changed around 1100, after which the cantus firmus typically appeared in the lowest-sounding voice. Later, the cantus firmus appeared in the tenor voice (from the Latin verb 'tenere', to hold), singing notes of longer duration, around which more florid lines, instrumental and/or vocal, were composed or improvised.

Composition using a cantus firmus continued to be the norm through the 13th century: almost all of the music of the St. Martial and Notre Dame schools uses a cantus firmus, as well as most 13th century motets. Many of these motets were written in several languages, with the cantus firmus in the lowest voice; the lyrics of love poems might be sung in the vernacular above sacred Latin texts in the form of a trope, or the sacred text might be sung to a familiar secular melody.

In the 14th century, the technique continued to be widely used for most sacred vocal music, although considerable elaboration began to appear: while most continental composers used isorhythmic methods, in England other composers experimented with a "migrant" cantus firmus, in which the tune moved from voice to voice, but without itself being elaborated significantly. Elaborations came later, in what was to be known as the paraphrase technique; this compositional method became important in composition of masses by the late 15th century. (See paraphrase mass.)

The cyclic mass, which became the standard type of mass composition around the middle of the 15th century, used cantus firmus technique as its commonest organising principle. At first the cantus firmus was almost always drawn from plainchant, but the range of sources gradually widened to include other sacred sources and even sometimes popular songs. The cantus firmus was at first restricted to the tenor, but by the end of the century many composers experimented with other ways of using it, such as introducing it into each voice as a contrapuntal subject, or using it with a variety of rhythms. During the 16th century the cantus firmus technique began to be abandoned, replaced with the parody (or imitation) technique, in which multiple voices of a pre-existing source were incorporated into a sacred composition such as a mass. Yet while composers in Italy, France, and the Low Countries used the parody and paraphrase techniques, composers in Spain, Portugal, and Germany continued to use the cantus firmus method in nationally idiosyncratic ways.

Probably the most widely set of the secular cantus firmus melodies was "L'homme armé". Over 40 settings are known, including two by Josquin des Prez, and six by an anonymous composer or composers in Naples, which were intended as a cycle. Many composers of the middle and late Renaissance wrote at least one mass based on this melody, and the practice lasted into the seventeenth century, with a late setting by Carissimi. There are several theories regarding the meaning of the name: one suggests that the "armed man" represents St Michael the Archangel, while another suggests that it refers to the name of a popular tavern (Maison L'Homme Armé) near Dufay's rooms in Cambrai. Being that this music arose shortly after the Fall of Constantinople in 1453, it is possible that the text "the armed man should be feared" arose from the fear of the Ottoman Turks, who were expanding militarily towards central Europe. There are numerous other examples of secular cantus firmi used for composition of masses; some of the most famous include: "Se la face ay pale" (Dufay), "Fortuna desperata" (attributed to Antoine Busnois), "Fors seulement" (Johannes Ockeghem), "Mille Regretz", and "Westron Wynde" (anonymous).

German composers in the Baroque period in Germany, notably Bach, used chorale melodies as cantus firmi. In the opening movement of Bach's St Matthew Passion, the chorale "O Lamm Gottes, unschuldig" appears in long notes, sung by a separate choir of boys "in ripieno".

== As a teaching tool ==
- Using a cantus firmus as a means of teaching species counterpoint was the basis of Gradus ad Parnassum by Johann Joseph Fux, although the method was first published by Girolamo Diruta in 1610. Counterpoint is still taught routinely using a method adapted from Fux, and based on the cantus firmus. Cantus firmi used to teach counterpoint adhere to certain rules of music theory, including beginning and ending on a tonic note, and only containing consonant intervals.

== As metaphor ==
Several writers have used "cantus firmus" as a metaphor. Kate Gross used it for those childhood pursuits that give her happiness and define her - pursuits that she calls the "enduring melody" of her life.

Dietrich Bonhoeffer also uses the metaphor for love for God in his "Letters and Papers from Prison".
