= Antoine Brumel =

French composer (c. 1460–1512/13)

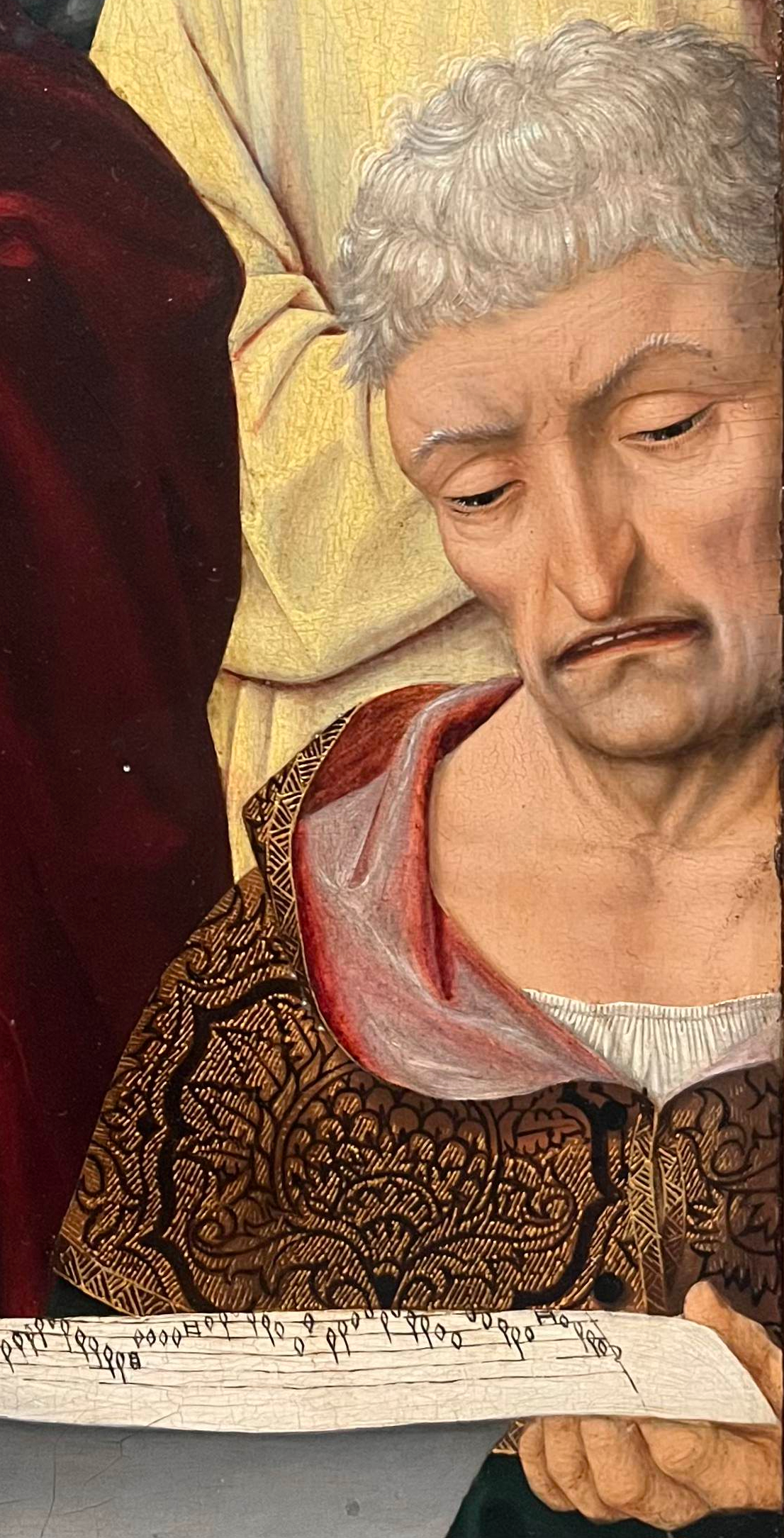
Composer, perhaps Brumel, from The Celestial Concert, a devotional triptych held at the Musée de Cluny (c. 1510 – c. 1515)

Antoine Brumel (French pronunciation: [ɑ̃twan bʁymɛl]; c. 1460 – 1512 or 1513) was a French composer. He was one of the first renowned French members of the Franco-Flemish school of the Renaissance, and, after Josquin des Prez, was one of the most influential composers of his generation.

== Life ==
Little is known about his early life, but he was probably born west of Chartres, perhaps in the town of Brunelles, near to Nogent-le-Rotrou, in c. 1460; making him one of the first of the Netherlandish composers who was actually French.

Brumel sang at Notre-Dame de Chartres from 9 August 1483 until 1486, and subsequently held posts at St Peter's in Geneva (until 1492) and Laon (around 1497) before becoming choirmaster to the boys at Notre-Dame de Paris from 1498 to 1500, and choirmaster to Alfonso I d'Este at Ferrara from 1506, replacing the famous composer Jacob Obrecht who had died of the plague there the previous year. The chapel there was disbanded in 1510, after which he evidently stayed in Italy; several documents connect him with churches in Faenza and Mantua, where he probably died in 1512 or shortly after.

Brumel is known to have written at least one work after his dismissal from Ferrara (the Missa de beata virgine), and he may still have been alive in 1513 since there is a mention in a treatise of Vincenzo Galilei that Brumel was one of a group of composers who met with Pope Leo X in that year; however since Vincenzo was writing more than a generation later and reporting second-hand, and no other corroborating evidence has been found, this account is not considered to be certain. Then again, Heinrich Glarean, writing later about Brumel, indicated that he lived to a "ripe old age", so it remains possible that he lived longer, but records have not survived.

A Jachet Brumel was organist for the Ferrara court in 1543, and is presumed to be Antoine's son.

== Music ==
Brumel was at the center of the changes that were taking place in European music around 1500, in which the previous style of highly differentiated voice parts, composed one after another, was giving way to smoothly flowing, equal parts, composed simultaneously. These changes can be seen in his music, with some of his earlier work conforming to the older style, and his later compositions showing the polyphonic fluidity which became the stylistic norm of the Josquin generation.

=== Masses ===
Brumel is best known for his masses, the most famous of which is the twelve-voice Missa Et ecce terræ motus. Techniques of composition varied throughout his life: he sometimes used the cantus firmus technique, already archaic by the end of the 15th century, and also the paraphrase technique, in which the source material appears elaborated, and in other voices than the tenor, often in imitation. He used paired imitation, like Josquin, but often in a freer manner than the more famous composer. A relatively unusual technique he used in an untitled mass was to use different source material for each of the sections (mass titles are taken from the pre-existing composition used as their basis: usually a plainchant, motet or chanson: hence the mass is without title). Brumel wrote a Missa l'homme armé, as did so many other composers of the Renaissance: appropriately, he set it as a cantus firmus mass, with the popular song in long notes in the tenor, to make it easier to hear. All of his masses, with the exception of the highly unusual twelve-voice Missa Et ecce terræ motus, are for four voices.

During the 16th century the most famous of Brumel's masses was his Missa de beata virgine, a paraphrase mass using elaborations of various plainchant melodies. According to Heinrich Glarean, writing in 1547, it was written in competition with Josquin, who simultaneously wrote his own Missa de Beata Virgine, and the two works are similar in style.

Brumel's Missa pro defunctis for four voices, a late work, is notable for being the first polyphonic requiem setting to include the Dies Irae. Brumel's setting uses alternatim polyphony (sections of plainchant alternate with sections in polyphony). In addition, this is one of the earliest polyphonic requiems to survive: only Johannes Ockeghem's Requiem is earlier.

=== Motets, chansons, and instrumental music ===
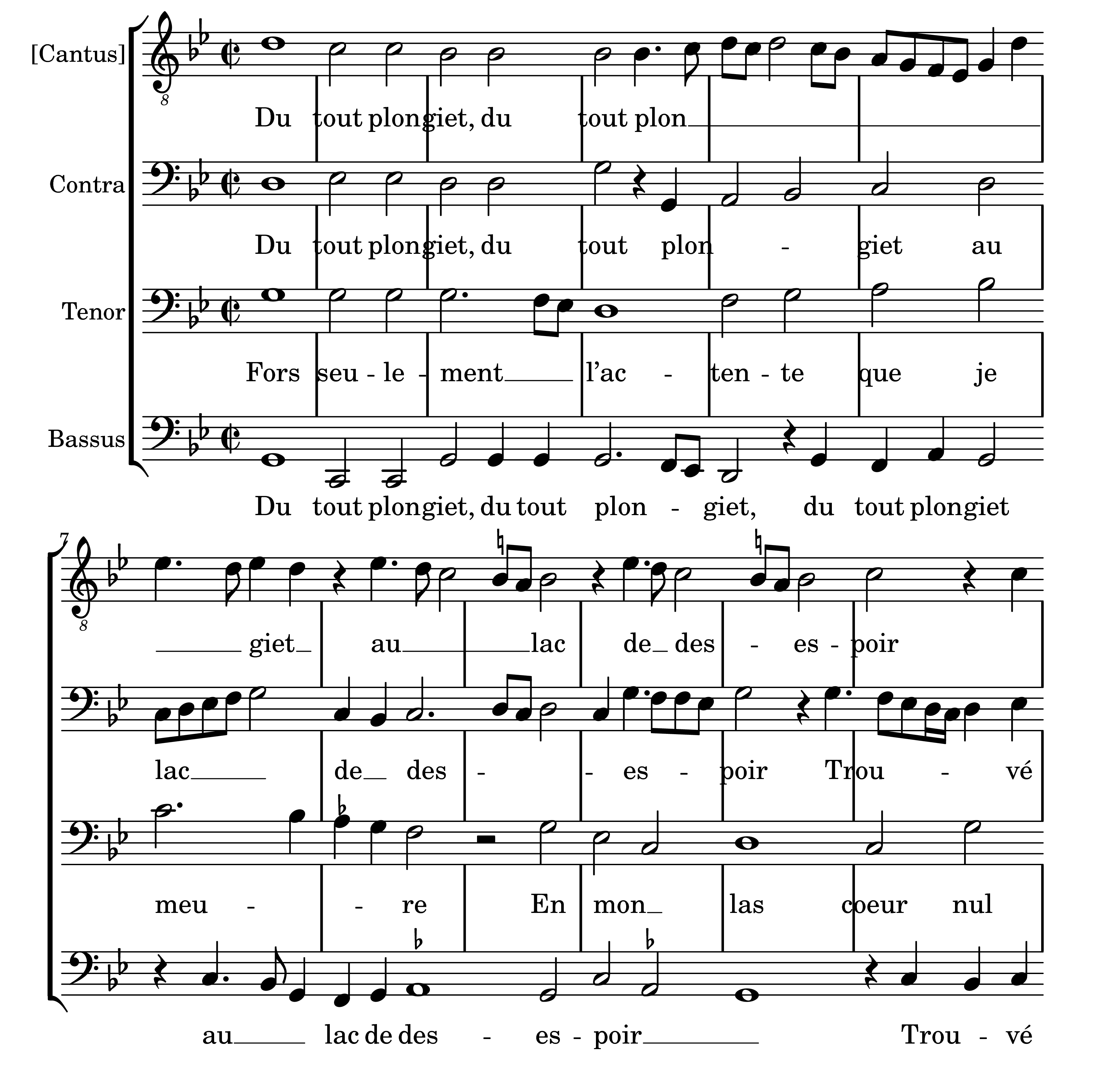
"Du tout plongiet–Fors seulement", a 4-voice chanson with two texts by Brumel

"Du tout plongiet – Fors seulement"
MIDI version

Brumel also wrote numerous motets, chansons, and some instrumental music. His style in these also evolved throughout his life, with his earlier works showing the irregular lines and rhythmic complexity of the Ockeghem generation, while the later ones used the smooth imitative polyphony of the Josquin style as well as the homophonic textures of the current Italian composers of popular songs (for example Tromboncino, who was in Ferrara at the same time as Brumel). One peculiar feature of Brumel's style is that sometimes he uses very quick syllabic declamation in chordal writing, anticipating the madrigalian fashion of later in the 16th century. This appears sometimes in the "Credo" sections of his masses – logically, since that section has the longest text, and if set similarly to the other sections to the mass, it can be disproportionately long.

After Josquin des Prez, Brumel is considered one of the greatest composers of his generation. During his life, Ottaviano Petrucci published a book of his masses, and a number of other composers wrote pieces commemorating him after his death. His impressive 12-voice Missa et ecce terræ motus survives from a part-book used for performance by Lassus in Munich around 1570, long after Brumel's death.

== Works ==
- Mass and mass fragments
  - Missa “A l’ombre d’ung buissonet” for four voices
  - Missa “Berzerette savoyenne” for four voices
  - Missa “Bon temps” for four voices
  - Missa de beata virgine for four voices (probably 1510/12)
  - Missa de dringhs for four voices
  - Missa “Descendi in hortum” for four voices
  - Missa dominicalis for four voices
  - Missa “Et ecce terrae motus” for twelve voices (otherwise known as the “earthquake” mass. This work has nothing to do with earthquakes; its cantus firmus is taken from the Easter antiphon “And behold, there was a great earthquake”)
  - Missa “Je nay dueul” for four voices
  - Missa “L’homme armé” for four voices
  - Missa “Ut re mi fa sol la” for four voices
  - Missa “Victimae paschali” for four voices
  - Missa sine nomine (I) for four voices
  - Missa sine nomine (II) for four voices (Kyrie only; otherwise only one voice preserved)
  - Missa pro defunctis for four voices
  - Benedictus: fuga ex una, canon for two voices
  - Benedictus for two voices
  - Credo for four voices
  - Credo “villayge” for four voices
  - “Pleni sunt caeli”: fuga ex una, canon for two voices
  - Agnus for six voices (sometimes used in the Missa "Et ecce terrae motus")

== Selected discography ==
- Brumel's Missa Et ecce terræ motus ("Earthquake" Mass) performed by the Huelgas Ensemble directed by Paul Van Nevel (Sony Vivarte 46348). 1990 Première recording; "Continental" sound.
- Brumel's Missa Et ecce terræ motus ("Earthquake" Mass), Magnificat secundi toni and Lamentations performed by the Tallis Scholars under the direction of Peter Phillips (Gimell Records 26). 1992 "British" sound.
- Brumel's Missa Et ecce terræ motus ("Earthquake" Mass) performed by the Ensemble Clément Janequin and Les Sacqueboutiers de Toulouse directed by Dominique Visse (Harmonia Mundi 901738). Performed with instruments doubling voices.
- Brumel's Missa pro defunctis (together with La Rue's Missa pro defunctis) performed by The Clerks' Group directed by Edward Wickham (ASV CDGAU352)
- Brumel's Lamentations performed by 'i buoni antichi' (The Gentlemen of St John's, College Cambridge and singers from Choralen van de Grote Kerk Breda); Directed by James Burton. 'O Bone Jesu' LBCD 86.
- Brumel's Missa Victimae paschali laudes, Ave. Virgo gloriasa, Mater Patris, Nativitas unde gaudia, O Crux, ave, spes unica, The Hilliard ensemble? CD Coro 2007
- Brumel's Complete Lamentations, Musica Secreta, conducted by Deborah Roberts & Laurie Stras. CD Obsidian 2019.
