= Guillaume Crétin =

French poet

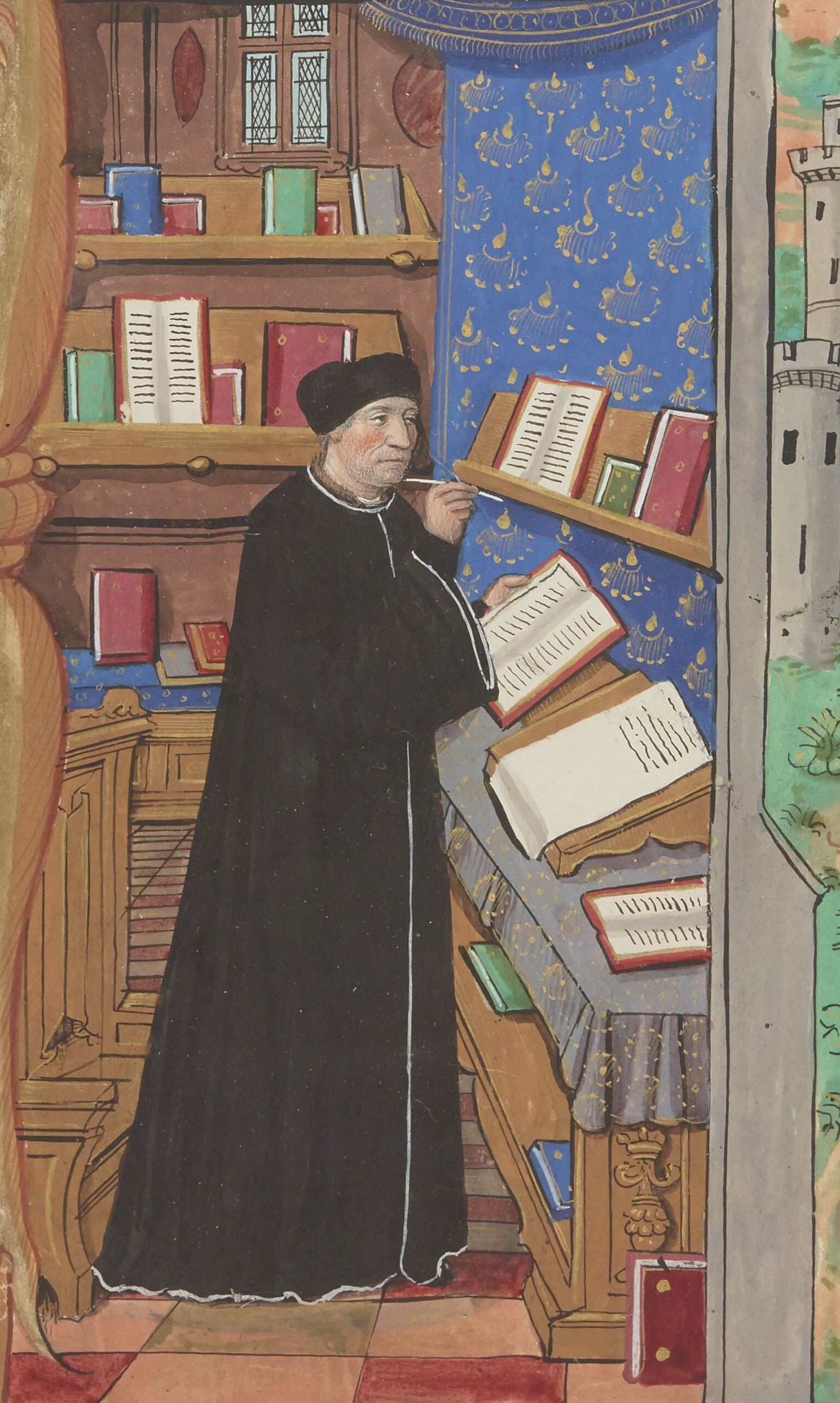
Guillaume Crétin at work, detail of a miniature from the second volume of his Chronique française, c. 1515–1525

Guillaume Cretin (c. 1460 – 30 November 1525) was a French coterie poet and chronicler who is considered to belong to the network of the Grands Rhétoriqueurs ("rhetoricians"). He is sometimes mistakenly referred to as Guillaume Dubois, but this is a wordplay found in an epistle addressed to Jean Martin.

Cretin wrote in a wide variety of literary genres, including fixed-form lyrics (chants royaux, ballades, and rondeaux) as well as narrative verse. Cretin's poetic oeuvre was edited by Kathleen Chesney in 1932.

== Life ==
Crétin was treasurer of the Sainte-Chapelle de Vincennes, then cantor of the Sainte-Chapelle de Paris and ordinary almoner to Francis I of France. Throughout his life, he composed numerous works for circulation at the royal court.

== Works ==
Crétin's works include many chants royaux which were composed for the puys, Northern French poetry competitions in honour of the Virgin Mary. These were praised by his contemporaries and often won awards. He was recognised as a master, notably by Jean Lemaire de Belges and Clément Marot. He is one of the great virtuosos of 'rime équivoquée' (for example, the Epistre à Honorat de la Jaille of circa 1510).

From 1515, Crétin started work on a verse chronicle of French history, the Grandes Chroniques de France, which remained unfinished at the time of his death. It was commissioned in 1515 by Francis I and is preserved today in six manuscripts.

Crétin's corpus also includes occasional verse. His last work, composed sometime between February and November 1525, is the Apparition du Mareschal sans reproche, feu Messire Jacques de Chabannes, en son vivant Mareschal de France, a lengthy dream vision commemorating Jacques II de Chabannes de La Palice who was killed at the Battle of Pavia in 1525.

== Afterlife ==
During his lifetime, Crétin published his poetry in manuscript format; only a small handful of his poems printed, likely without the poet's collaboration. When Crétin died in late November 1525, Parisian printers set out to gather together, arrange, and edit Crétin's works for posterity. This was the case of Galliot Du Pré, a prolific Parisian bookseller, who printed the first collected editions of Crétin's works in 1526 and 1527.
