= Superius =

In early music polyphony, superius or cantus is the Latin language-derived name given to the highest voice or part.

== See also ==
- Voice type
- Quintus (vocal music)
