= Johannes Ockeghem =

Renaissance composer (c. 1410–1497)

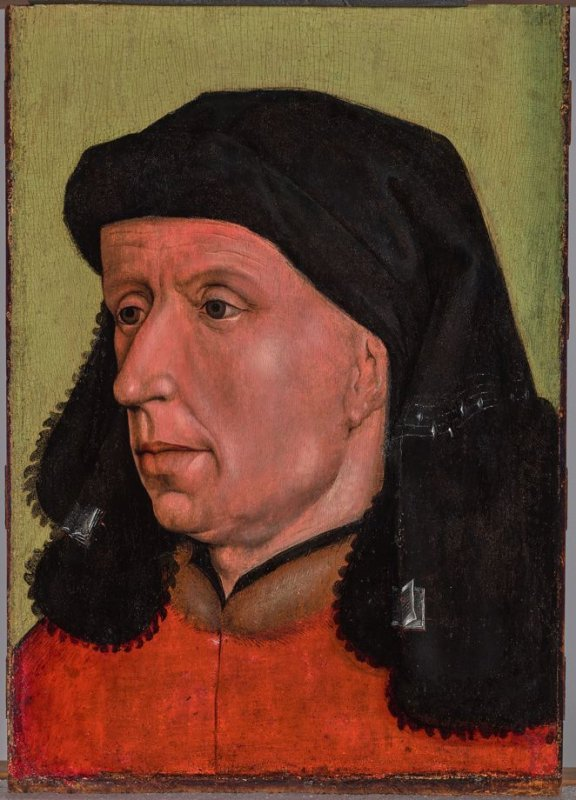
- Speculative posthumous portrait of Ockeghem (Note: This portrait is tentatively identified as Ockeghem by Reinhard Strohm, "Portrait of a Musician", in Vendrix, Philippe, ed. Johannes Ockeghem : actes du XLe Colloque international d'études humanistes, Tours, 3–8 février 1997. Paris: Klinckseick, 1998. [pp. 167-172.] WorldCat shows copies at the Sorbonne, and Bibliothèque nationale de France: WorldCat page op. cit.)
- Born: c. 1410; Saint-Ghislain, Hainaut
- Died: 6 February 1497 (aged 86–87); Tours, France
- Occupations: Composer; singer
- Works: List of compositions

Johannes Ockeghem (c. 1410 – 6 February 1497) was a Franco-Flemish composer and singer of early Renaissance music. Ockeghem was the leading European composer in the period between Guillaume Du Fay and Josquin des Prez, and he was—with his colleague Antoine Busnois—a prominent European composer in the second half of the 15th century. He was an important proponent of the early Franco-Flemish School.

Ockeghem was well associated with other prominent composers of the time, and spent most of his career serving the French royal court under Charles VII, Louis XI and Charles VIII. Numerous poets and musicians lamented his death, including Erasmus, Guillaume Crétin, Jean Molinet and Josquin, who composed the well-known Nymphes des bois for him.

It is thought that Ockeghem's extant works represent only a small part of his entire oeuvre, including around 14 masses, 20 chansons and fewer than 10 motets—though the exact numbers vary due to attribution uncertainties. His better-known works include the canon-based Missa prolationum; the Missa cuiusvis toni, which can be sung in any mode; the chanson Fors seulement; and the earliest surviving polyphonic Requiem.

== Life ==
=== Background and early life ===
The spelling of Ockeghem's name comes from a supposed autograph of his which survived as late as 1885, and was reproduced by Eugène Giraudet, a historian in Tours; the document has since been lost. In 15th-century sources, the spelling "Okeghem" predominates. Other spellings include Ogkegum, Okchem, Hocquegam and Ockegham.

Ockeghem is believed to have been born in the Walloon city Saint-Ghislain, Burgundian Netherlands (now Belgium). His birthdate is unknown; dates as early as 1410 and as late as 1430 have been proposed. The earlier date is based on the possibility that he knew Binchois in Hainaut before the older composer moved from Mons to Lille in 1423. Ockeghem would have to have been younger than 15 at the time. This particular speculation derives from Ockeghem's reference, in the lament he wrote on the death of Binchois in 1460, to a chanson by Binchois dated to that time. In this lament, Ockeghem not only honored the older composer by imitating his style, but also revealed some useful biographical information about him. The comment by the poet Guillaume Crétin, in the lament he wrote on Ockeghem's death in 1497, "it was a great shame that a composer of his talents should die before 100 years old", is also often taken as evidence for the earlier birthdate for Ockeghem.

In 1993, documents dating from 1607 were found stating that "Jan Hocquegam" was a native of Saint-Ghislain in the County of Hainaut, which was confirmed by references in 16th-century documents. This suggests that, though he first appears in records in Flanders, he was a native speaker of Picard. Previously, most biographies surmised that he was born in East Flanders, either in the town after which he was named (present-day Okegem, from which his ancestors must have come) or in the neighboring town of Dendermonde (French: Termonde), where the surname Ockeghem occurred in the 14th and 15th century. Occasionally, Bavay, now in the Nord department in France, was suggested as his birthplace as well.

Details of his early life are lacking. Like many composers in this period, he started his musical career as a chorister, although the exact location of his education is unknown: Mons, a town near Saint-Ghislain that had at least two churches with competent music schools, has been suggested. The first actual documented record of Ockeghem is from the Onze-Lieve-Vrouwe cathedral in Antwerp, where he was employed in June 1443 as a "left-hand choir singer" ("left-handers" sang composed music, "right-handers" sang chant). He probably sang under the direction of Johannes Pullois, whose employment also dates from that year. This church was a distinguished establishment, and it was likely here that Ockeghem became familiar with the English compositional style, which some suggest influenced musical practices on the continent in the late 15th century.

=== Training and career ===
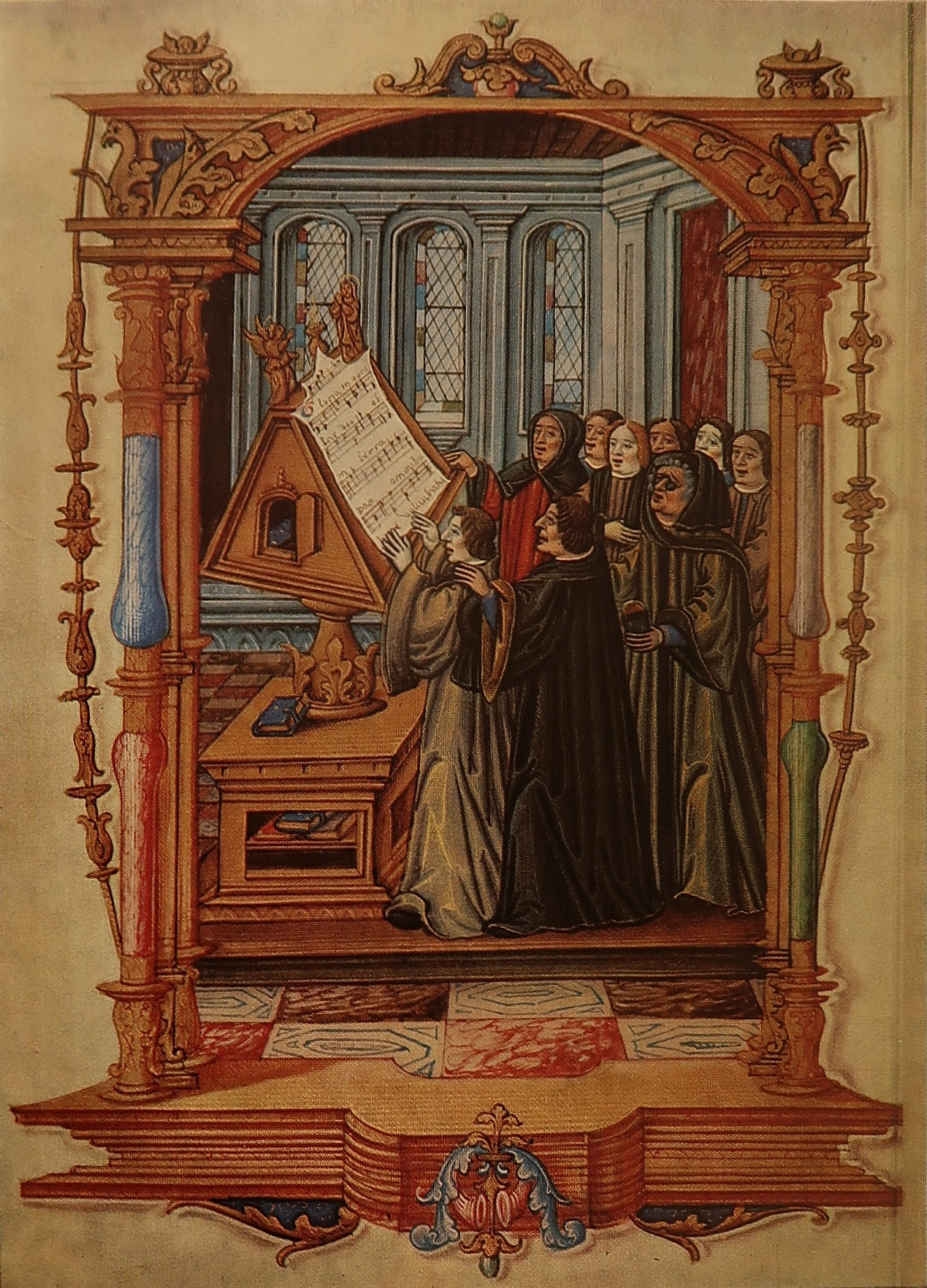
Ockeghem (shown wearing glasses) and singers of the royal chapel in a posthumous 1523 miniature

Ockeghem probably studied with Gilles Binchois, and at least was closely associated with him at the Burgundian court. Since Antoine Busnois wrote a motet in honor of Ockeghem sometime before 1467, it is probable that those two were acquainted as well; and writers of the time often link Dufay, Busnois and Ockeghem. Although Ockeghem's musical style differs considerably from that of the older generation, it is probable that he acquired his basic technique from them, and as such can be seen as a direct link from the Burgundian style to the next generation of Netherlanders, such as Obrecht and Josquin.

Between 1446 and 1448 Ockeghem served, along with singer and composer Jean Cousin, at the court of Charles I, Duke of Bourbon in Moulins, now in central France. During this service he became the first among the singing chaplains to appear in the court records. Around 1452 he moved to Paris where he served as maestro di cappella to the French court, as well as treasurer of the collegiate church of St. Martin, at Tours. In addition to serving at the French court – both for Charles VII and Louis XI – he held posts at Notre Dame de Paris and at St. Benoît. He is known to have travelled to Spain in 1470, as part of a diplomatic mission for the King, which was a complex affair attempting both to dissuade Spain from joining an alliance with England and Burgundy against France, and to arrange a marriage between Isabella I of Castile and Charles, Duke of Guyenne (the brother of king Louis XI). After the death of Louis XI (1483), not much is known for certain about Ockeghem's whereabouts, though it is known that he went to Bruges and Tours, and he probably died in the latter town since he left a will there. The number of laments written on Ockeghem's death on 6 February 1497 suggests the respect he commanded among contemporaries; among the most famous of the musical settings of these many poems is Nymphes des bois by Josquin des Prez. Other authors of these poems included Molinet and Desiderius Erasmus; Johannes Lupi provided another musical setting.

== Music and influence ==
Ockeghem's output was limited relative to the length of his career and his established reputation, and some of his work was lost. Many works formerly attributed to him are now presumed to be by other composers; Ockeghem's total output of reliably attributed compositions, as with many of the most famous composers of the time (such as Josquin), has shrunk with time. Surviving reliably attributed works include some 14 masses (including a Requiem), an isolated Credo (Credo sine nomine), five motets, a motet-chanson (a deploration on the death of Binchois), and 21 chansons. Thirteen of Ockeghem's masses are preserved in the Chigi codex, a Flemish manuscript dating to around 1500. His Missa pro Defunctis is the earliest surviving polyphonic Requiem mass (another possibly earlier setting by Dufay has been lost). Some of his works, alongside compositions by his contemporaries, are included in Petrucci's Harmonice musices odhecaton (1501), the first collection of music published using moveable type.

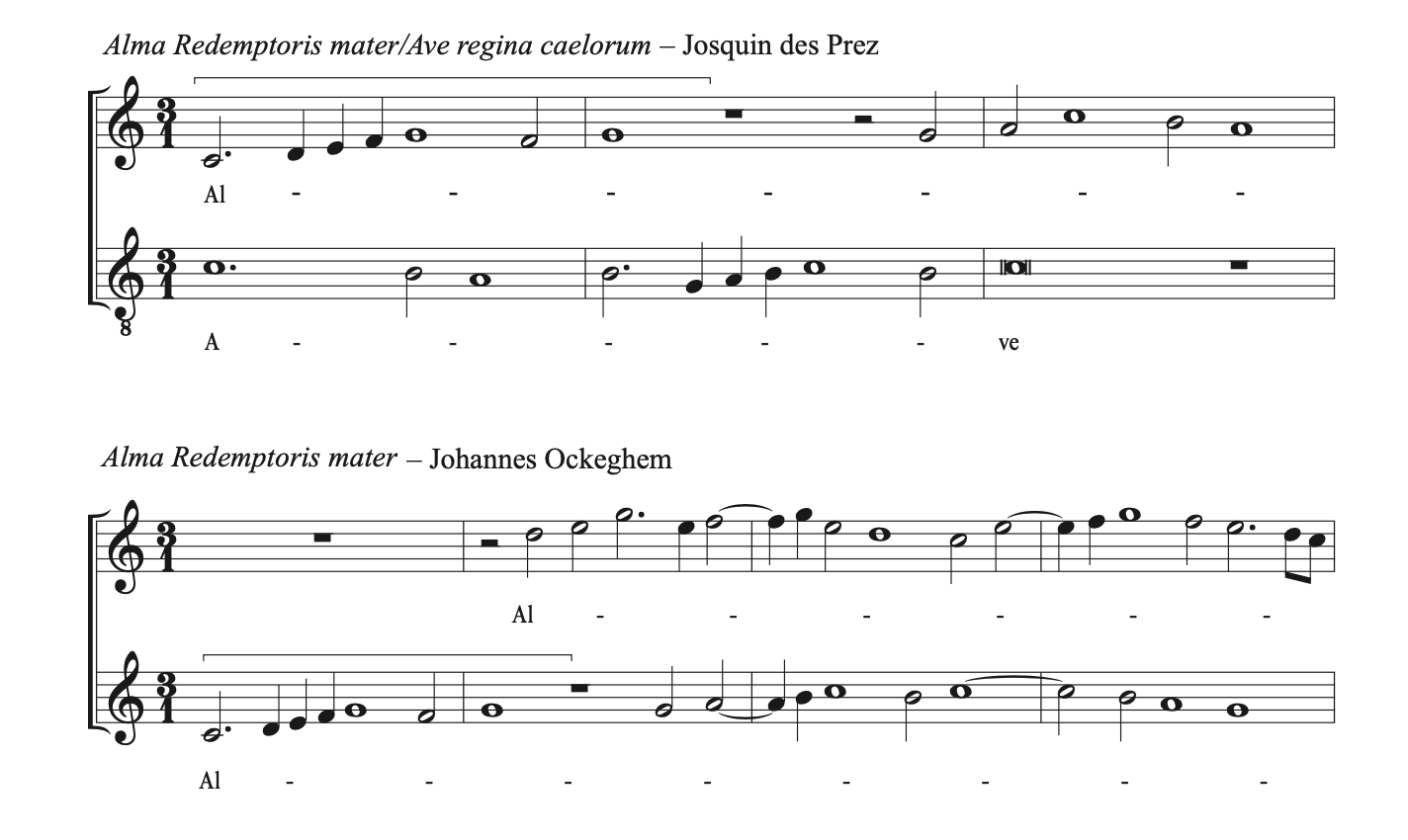
Comparison of Josquin's double motet Alma Redemptoris mater/Ave regina caelorum (top) and Ockeghem's Alma Redemptoris mater (bottom). Ockeghem's initial motif is seemingly quoted by Josquin (both identified by brackets).

Dating Ockeghem's works is difficult, as there are almost no external points of reference, except of course the death of Binchois (1460) for which Ockeghem composed a motet-chanson. The Missa Caput is almost certainly an early work, since it follows on an anonymous English mass of the same title dated to the 1440s, and his late masses may include the Missa Ma maistresse and Missa Fors seulement, in view of both his innovative treatment of the cantus firmus and his increasingly homogeneous textures later in his life.

Ockeghem used the cantus firmus technique in about half of his masses; the earliest of these masses used head motifs at the start of the individual movements, a common practice around 1440 but one that had already become archaic by around 1450. Three of his masses, Missa Ma maistresse, Missa Fors seulement, and Missa Mi-mi are based on chansons he wrote himself, and use more than one voice of the chanson, foreshadowing the parody mass techniques of the 16th century. In his remaining masses, including the Missa cuiusvis toni and Missa prolationum, no borrowed material has been found, and the works seem to have been freely composed.

Ockeghem would sometimes place borrowed material in the lowest voice, such as in the Missa Caput, one of three masses written in the mid-15th century based on that fragment of chant from the English Sarum Rite. Other characteristics of Ockeghem's compositional technique include variation in voices' rhythmic character so as to maintain their independence.

Ockeghem influenced Josquin des Prez and the subsequent generation of Netherlandish composers; he was known throughout Europe for his expressive music and his technical skill. Two of the most notable contrapuntal achievements of the 15th century include his Missa prolationum, which consists entirely of mensuration canons, and the Missa cuiusvis toni, designed to be performed in any of the different modes, but even these technique-oriented pieces demonstrate his uniquely expressive use of vocal ranges and tonal language. Ockeghem's use of wide-ranging and rhythmically active bass lines was distinctive among composers in the Netherlandish Schools, and may be because this was his voice range.

Thomas Tallis' Missa Puer natus est nobis has cryptic, puzzle-like patterns in the note lengths of the cantus firmus that resemble the mathematical "games" of Ockeghem's cantus firmi.

== List of compositions ==
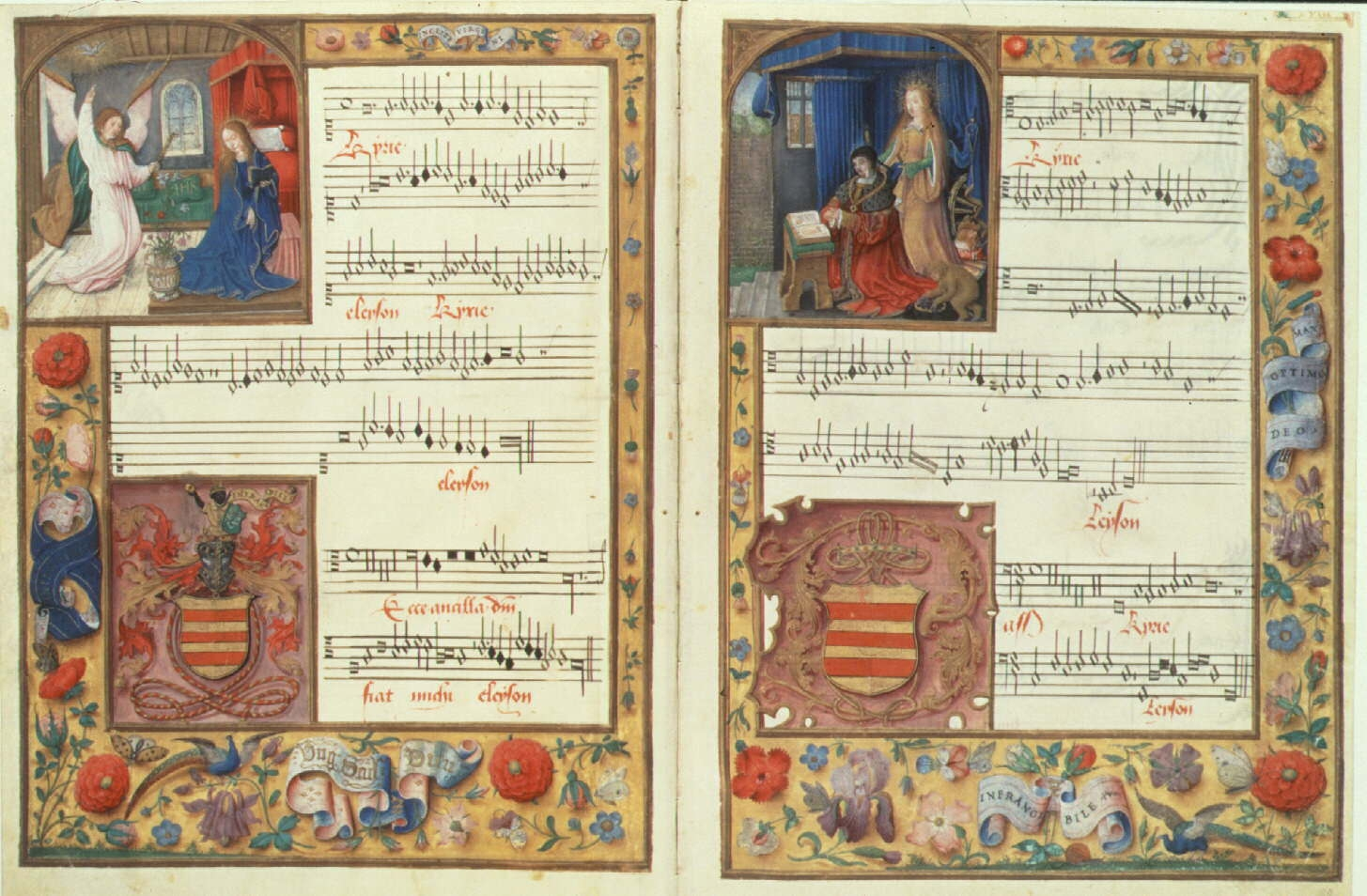
An illuminated opening from the Chigi codex featuring the Kyrie of Ockeghem's Missa Ecce ancilla Domini

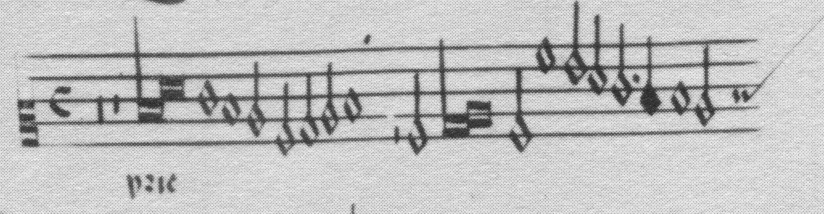
Johannes Ockeghem, Kyrie "Au travail suis" excerpt

Masses

1. Missa sine nomine a 3 (doubtful attribution)
2. Missa sine nomine a 5 (incomplete: only Kyrie, Gloria and Credo exist)
3. Missa Au travail suis a 4
4. Missa Caput
5. Missa cuiusvis toni
6. Missa De plus en plus
7. Missa Ecce ancilla Domini
8. Missa Fors seulement a 5 (has not survived complete: only Kyrie, Gloria and Credo remain)
9. Missa L'homme armé a 4
10. Missa Ma maistresse (only Kyrie and Gloria extant)
11. Missa Mi-mi a 4 (also known as the Missa quarti toni)
12. Missa prolationum a 4 (circa 1470)
13. Missa quinti toni a 3
14. Missa pro defunctis (Requiem) a 4 (incomplete, probably composed for the funeral of Charles VII in 1461)
15. Credo sine nomine (Mass section, also known as Credo "De village")

Motets

Marian antiphons

1. Alma Redemptoris Mater
2. Ave Maria
3. Salve Regina

Others

1. Intemerata Dei mater a 5 (possibly written 1487)
2. Ut heremita solus (possibly intended for instrumental performance)
3. Deo gratias a 36 (doubtful attribution)
4. Gaude Maria (doubtful attribution)

Motet-chanson

1. Mort tu as navré/Miserere (lamentation on the death of Gilles Binchois, probably written in 1460)

Chansons

Two voices

1. O rosa bella (ballata) (Ai lasso mi – John Bedyngham/John Dunstaple?)

Three voices

1. Aultre Venus estes
2. Au travail suis (attrib: possibly by Barbingant)
3. Baisiés moy dont fort
4. D'ung aultre amer
5. Fors seulement contre
6. Fors seulement l'attente
7. Il ne m'en chault plus
8. La despourveue et la bannie
9. L'autre d'antan
10. Les desléaux ont la saison
11. Ma bouche rit
12. Ma maistresse
13. Prenez sur moi
14. Presque transi
15. Quant de vous seul
16. Qu'es mi vida preguntays
17. Se vostre cuer eslongne
18. Tant fuz gentement resjouy
19. Ung aultre l'a

Three or four voices

1. J'en ay dueil

Four voices

1. S'elle m'amera/Petite camusette

== Recordings ==
- Flemish Masters, Virginia Arts Recordings, VA-04413, performed by Zephyrus. Includes the Ockeghem Alma Redemptoris mater, the Obrecht Missa Sub tuum presidium, as well as motets by Willaert, Clemens non Papa, Josquin, Mouton, and Gombert.
- Angelus, Virginia Arts Recordings, VA-00338, performed by Zephyrus. Includes the Ockeghem Ave Maria ... benedicta tu, as well as motets by Palestrina, Josquin, Victoria, Rore, Morales, Clemens non Papa, Lassus, de Wert, and Andrea Gabrieli
- "Missa Cuiusvis Toni", æon, ÆCD 0753 (2 CDs-2007), performed by Ensemble Musica Nova, Lucien Kandel; First recording of the four versions. Ed. Gérard Geay.
- "Missa prolationum", agogique AGO 008, Ensemble Musica Nova, Lucien Kandel. Ed. Gérard Geay.
