= List of organ composers =

The following is a list of organ composers. As well as citing the most regarded composers of music for the pipe organ, this list includes important anonymous and early-music sources, as well as composers from under-researched regions and countries.

Much keyboard music of the late-medieval and Renaissance was often played interchangeably on organ, harpsichord, clavichord and the like, with the exception of liturgical music (Mass, Magnificat and Latin hymns versets, chorale settings, etc.) which are thought to have been played primarily on the organ. Several early sources clearly specify the use of organ in free works, such as the Ileborgh Tablature of 1448, which in the third praeambulum has the first-known indication for pedal notes.

Eras of composition are roughly categorized as follows:

- Medieval: before 1440
- Renaissance: 1440–1600
- Baroque: 1600–1750
- Classical: 1750–1810
- Romantic: 1810–1870
- Late Romantic: 1870–1910
- 20^{th} Century: 1910–1990
- Millennial: after 1990 (composers born after 1960)

== Tablatures, manuscripts, and printed music before 1580 ==
- Robertsbridge Codex (c. 1360)
- Groningen University: Incunabulum No. 70 (late 14^{th} C.)
- Codex Faenza (c. 1420)
- Ileborgh Tablature (1448)
- Lochamer-Liederbuch and Fundamentum Organisandi of Conrad Paumann (mid-15^{th} century)
- Buxheimer Orgelbuch (1460/1470)
- Codex of Nikolaus Apel (c. 1500)
- Tabulaturen etlicher Lobgesang of Arnolt Schlick (1512). First known printed organ music
- Amerbach (Bonifacius) Tablatures of Hans Kotter (1513 and c. 1522) [includes music of Paul Hofhaimer]
- Fundamentbuch of Hans Buchner (early 16^{th} C.)
- Frottole intabulate da sonare of Andrea Antico (1517)
- British Library: Royal Appendix MS 58 (early 16^{th} C.)
- Venice: Biblioteca Nazionale Marciana ital. 1227 (early 16^{th} C.)
- Trent, Archivio di Stato Sezione tedesco Miscellanea codicetto 105 (includes music of Arnolt Schlick (c. 1521)
- Recerchari Motetti Canzoni of Marc'Antonio Cavazzoni (1523)
- Tablature of Leonhard Kleber (1524)
- St. Gallen: Tablature of Fridolin Sicher (sometime between 1517 and 1531)
- Organ tablatures of Pierre Attaingnant, in 7 Volumes (1531)
- Intavolatura cioè recercari, canzoni, himni, Magnificat... libro primo of Girolamo Cavazzoni (1543)
- Bergamo Organ Book, Bergamo, Italy (16^{th} C.)
- Krakow "Holy Ghost" Tablature, Poland (1548)
- Intavolatura d'organo, cioè misse, himni, Magnificat... libro secondo of Girolamo Cavazzoni (before 1549)
- The Tablature of Jan of Lublin [Johannes of Lublin], Poland (mid-16^{th} C.)
- Castell'Arquato Manuscript (mid-16^{th} C.)
- Libro primero de la Declaración de instrumentos of Juan Bermudo (1549)
- Intavolatura Nova di Balli of Antonio Gardano [Gardane] (1551)
- Libro de cifra nueva para tecla, arpa, y vihuela of Luis Venegas de Henestrosa (1557)
- Klagenfurt Tablature (c. 1560): http://adartemmusicae.com/klagenfurt_en.html
- Arte de tañer fantasía of Tomás de Santa María (1565)
- The Mulliner Book (1570)
- Canzoni francese intavolate per sonar d’organo and Tocate, Ricercari et Canzoni francese intavolate per sonar d’organo of Sperindio Bertoldo (before 1571, publ. posthumously in 1591)
- Orgel oder Instrument Tabulatur of Elias Ammerbach (1571/revised and expanded 1583)
- Obras de música para tecla, arpa y vihuela of Antonio de Cabezón (1578)
- British Library: Add MS 29,996 (16^{th}–17^{th} C.)

== Argentina ==
| Name | Date of birth | Date of death | Era | Country/Region | Other Countries |
|---|---|---|---|---|---|
| García Morillo, Roberto | 1911 | 2003 | 20^{th} Century | Argentina | |
| Ginastera, Alberto | 1916 | 1983 | 20^{th} Century | Argentina | |

== Australia ==
| Name | Date of birth | Date of death | Era | Country/Region | Other Countries |
|---|---|---|---|---|---|
| Koehne, Graeme | 1956 | — | 20^{th} Century | Australia | |
| Helleman, Christian | 1881 | 1954 | 20^{th} Century | Australia | |
| Truman, Ernest | 1869 | 1948 | Late Romantic | Australia | |
| Bainton, Edgar | 1880 | 1956 | 20^{th} Century | United Kingdom | emigrated to Australia |
| Nixon, June | 1942 | — | 20^{th} Century | Australia | |
| Rea, Alexander | 1830 | 1909 | 19^{th} Century | Australia | |

== Austria ==
(see also Germany)

| Name | Date of birth | Date of death | Era | Country/Region | Other Countries |
|---|---|---|---|---|---|
| Hofhaimer, Paul | 1459 | 1537 | Renaissance | Austria | |
| Muffat, Georg | 1653 | 1704 | Baroque | Austria | |
| Muffat, Gottlieb | 1690 | 1770 | Baroque | Austria | |
| Poglietti, Alessandro | 1600 (c.) | 1683 | Baroque | Austria | |
| Richter, Ferdinand Tobias | 1651 | 1711 | Baroque | Austria | |
| Wagenseil, Georg Christoph | 1715 | 1777 | Baroque | Austria | |
| Albrechtsberger, Johann Georg | 1736 | 1809 | Classical | Austria | |
| Mozart, Wolfgang Amadeus | 1756 | 1791 | Classical | Austria | |
| Sechter, Simon | 1788 | 1867 | Classical | Austria | |
| Labor, Josef | 1842 | 1924 | Late Romantic | Austria | born in Bohemia |
| Fuchs, Robert | 1847 | 1927 | Late Romantic | Austria | |
| Herzogenberg, Heinrich von | 1843 | 1900 | Late Romantic | Austria | |
| Schmidt, Franz | 1874 | 1939 | Late Romantic | Austria | |
| David, Johann Nepomuk | 1895 | 1977 | 20^{th} Century | Austria | |
| Gál, Hans | 1890 | 1987 | 20^{th} Century | Austria | |
| Grabner, Hermann | 1886 | 1969 | 20^{th} Century | Austria | |
| Hauer, Josef Matthias | 1883 | 1959 | 20^{th} Century | Austria | |
| Heiller, Anton | 1923 | 1979 | 20^{th} Century | Austria | |
| Krenek, Ernst | 1900 | 1991 | 20^{th} Century | Austria | |
| Mitterer, Wolfgang | 1958 | — | 20^{th} Century | Austria | |
| Planyavsky, Peter | 1947 | — | 20^{th} Century | Austria | |
| Schlee, Thomas Daniel | 1957 | 2025 | 20^{th} Century | Austria | |
| Von Einem, Gottfried | 1918 | 1996 | 20^{th} Century | Austria | |

== Belgium ==
(see also France)

| Name | Date of birth | Date of death | Era | Country/Region | Other Countries |
|---|---|---|---|---|---|
| Chaumont, Lambert | 1630 | 1712 | Baroque | Belgium | |
| Cornet, Peeter | 1570/80 | 1633 | Baroque | Belgium | |
| Van den Kerckhoven, Abraham | 1618 (c.) | 1701 (c.) | Baroque | Belgium | |
| Benaut, Josse-François-Joseph | 1743 (c.) | 1794 | Classical | Belgium | |
| Vanden Gheyn, Matthias | 1721 | 1785 | Classical | Belgium | |
| Callaerts, Joseph | 1830 | 1901 | Romantic | Belgium | |
| Lemmens, Jacques-Nicolas | 1823 | 1881 | Romantic | Belgium | |
| Foccroulle, Bernard | 1953 | — | 20^{th} Century | Belgium | |
| Jongen, Joseph | 1873 | 1953 | Late Romantic | Belgium | |
| Maleingreau, Paul de | 1887 | 1956 | 20^{th} Century | Belgium | |
| Meulemans, Arthur | 1884 | 1966 | 20^{th} Century | Belgium | |
| Peeters, Flor | 1903 | 1986 | 20^{th} Century | Belgium | |
| Swinnen, Firmin | 1885 | 1972 | 20^{th} Century | Belgium | emigrated to the U.S. |

== Brazil ==
| Name | Date of birth | Date of death | Era | Country/Region | Other Countries |
|---|---|---|---|---|---|
| Nepomuceno, Alberto | 1864 | 1920 | Late Romantic | Brazil | |
| Costa, Fabio | 1971 | — | Millennial | Brazil | |

== Canada ==
| Name | Date of birth | Date of death | Era | Country/Region | Other Countries |
|---|---|---|---|---|---|
| Gagnon, Gustave | 1842 | 1930 | Late Romantic | Canada | |
| Bernier, Joseph-Arthur | 1877 | 1944 | Late Romantic | Canada | |
| Poirier, Benoit | 1882 | 1965 | Late Romantic | Canada | |
| Willan, Healey | 1880 | 1968 | 20^{th} Century | Canada | born in the U.K. |
| Bales, Gerald | 1919 | 2002 | 20^{th} Century | Canada | |
| Bancroft, H. Hugh | 1904 | 1988 | 20^{th} Century | Canada | born in the U.K. |
| Daveluy, Raymond | 1926 | 2016 | 20^{th} Century | Canada | |
| Kloppers, Jacobus | 1937 | — | 20^{th} Century | Canada | born in South Africa |
| Bédard, Denis | 1950 | — | 20^{th} Century | Canada | |
| Laurin, Rachel | 1961 | 2023 | Millennial | Canada | |
| MacMillan, Ernest | 1893 | 1973 | 20^{th} Century | Canada | |
| Tanguay, Georges-Émile | 1893 | 1964 | 20^{th} Century | | |

== Chile ==
| Name | Date of birth | Date of death | Era | Country/Region | Other Countries |
|---|---|---|---|---|---|
| Allende-Blin, Juan | 1928 | — | 20^{th} Century | Chile | emigrated to Germany |
| Orrego-Salas, Juan | 1919 | 2019 | 20^{th} Century | Chile | emigrated to the U.S. |
| Schidlowsky, León | 1931 | 2022 | 20^{th} Century | Chile | emigrated to Israel |
| Vargas, Darwin | 1925 | 1988 | 20^{th} Century | Chile | |

== China ==
| Name | Date of birth | Date of death | Era | Country/Region | Other Countries |
|---|---|---|---|---|---|
| Chen Gang | 1935 | 2026 | 20^{th} Century | China | |
| Chen Qigang | 1951 | — | 20^{th} Century | China | emigrated to France |

== Croatia ==
| Name | Date of birth | Date of death | Era | Country/Region | Other Countries |
|---|---|---|---|---|---|
| Dugan, Franjo | 1874 | 1948 | Late Romantic | Croatia | |
| Štolcer-Slavenski, Josip | 1896 | 1955 | 20^{th} Century | Croatia | |
| Papandopulo, Boris | 1906 | 1991 | 20^{th} Century | Croatia | |
| Bjelinski, Bruno | 1909 | 1992 | 20^{th} Century | Croatia | |
| Lang, Ivana | 1912 | 1982 | 20^{th} Century | Croatia | |
| Šulek, Stjepan | 1914 | 1986 | 20^{th} Century | Croatia | |
| Malec, Ivo | 1925 | 2019 | 20^{th} Century | Croatia | emigrated to France |
| Klobučar, Anđelko | 1931 | 2016 | 20^{th} Century | Croatia | |

== Cuba ==
| Name | Date of birth | Date of death | Era | Country/Region | Other Countries |
|---|---|---|---|---|---|
| García Caturla, Alejandro | 1906 | 1940 | 20^{th} Century | Cuba | |
| Diez Nieto, Alfredo | 1918 | 2021 | 20^{th} Century | Cuba | |
| Martinez, Odaline de la | 1949 | — | 20^{th} Century | Cuba | emigrated to the U.K. |

== Czech Republic (Bohemia) ==
| Name | Date of birth | Date of death | Era | Country/Region | Other Countries |
|---|---|---|---|---|---|
| Černohorský, Bohuslav Matěj | 1684 | 1742 | Baroque | Czech Republic (Bohemia) | |
| Kopřiva, Václav Jan | 1708 | 1789 | Baroque | Czech Republic (Bohemia) | |
| Zach, Jan | 1713 | 1773 | Baroque | Czech Republic (Bohemia) | |
| Seger, Josef | 1716 | 1782 | Baroque | Czech Republic (Bohemia) | |
| Brixi, František Xaver | 1732 | 1771 | Classical | Czech Republic (Bohemia) | |
| Kuchař, Jan Křtitel | 1751 | 1829 | Classical | Czech Republic (Bohemia) | |
| Kopřiva, Karel Blažej | 1756 | 1785 | Classical | Czech Republic (Bohemia) | |
| Klička, Josef | 1855 | 1937 | Late Romantic | Czech Republic (Bohemia) | |
| Wiedermann, Bedřich Antonín | 1883 | 1951 | 20^{th} Century | Czech Republic (Bohemia) | |
| Hába, Alois | 1893 | 1973 | 20^{th} Century | Czech Republic (Bohemia) | |
| Dalibor Cyril Vačkář | 1906 | 1984 | 20^{th} Century | Czech Republic | Croatia |
| Kabeláč, Miloslav | 1908 | 1979 | 20^{th} Century | Czech Republic (Bohemia) | |
| Luboš Sluka | 1928 | — | 20^{th} Century | Czech Republic (Bohemia) | |
| Eben, Petr | 1929 | 2007 | 20^{th} Century | Czech Republic (Bohemia) | |
| Pololáník, Zdeněk | 1935 | 2024 | 20^{th} Century | Czech Republic (Bohemia) | |

== Denmark ==
=== Romantic ===
- Camillo Carlsen
- Niels Gade
- Johan Peter Emilius Hartmann
- Gustav Helsted
- Edgar Henrichsen
- Otto Malling
- Carl Nielsen

=== 20^{th}–21^{st} centuries ===
- Bernhard Christensen
- Pelle Gudmundsen-Holmgreen
- Knud Jeppesen
- Leif Kayser
- Rued Langgaard
- Bernhard Lewkovitch
- Frederik Magle
- Per Nørgård
- Ib Nørholm
- Niels Otto Raasted
- Poul Ruders
- Paul Rung-Keller
- Leif Thybo
- Finn Viderø

== Estonia ==
=== Romantic ===
- Rudolf Tobias

=== 20^{th}–21^{st} centuries ===
- Alfred Karindi
- Arvo Pärt
- Peeter Süda

== Finland ==
=== Romantic ===
- Oskar Merikanto

=== 20^{th}–21^{st} centuries ===
- Kalevi Aho
- Paavo Heininen
- Kalevi Kiviniemi
- Joonas Kokkonen
- Taneli Kuusisto
- Erkki Melartin
- Väinö Raitio
- Einojuhani Rautavaara

== France ==
(see also Belgium)

=== Renaissance ===
- Pierre Attaingnant (publisher)
- Jean Titelouze

=== Baroque (French classical) ===
- Louis Archimbaud
- Jacques Boyvin
- Guillaume-Antoine Calvière
- Louis-Nicolas Clérambault
- Gaspard Corrette
- François Couperin
- Louis Couperin
- François d'Agincourt
- Jean-François Dandrieu
- Pierre Dandrieu
- Jean-Henri d'Anglebert
- Louis-Claude Daquin
- Nicolas de Grigny
- Louis-Antoine Dornel
- Pierre Dumage
- Dom George Franck
- Nicolas Gigault
- Jean-Adam Guilain (born in Germany)
- Gilles Jullien
- Mathieu Lanes
- Nicolas Lebègue
- Louis Marchand
- Christophe Moyreau
- Guillaume-Gabriel Nivers
- Charles Piroye
- Charles Racquet
- André Raison
- François Roberday

=== Late Classical ===
- Claude-Bénigne Balbastre
- Jacques-Marie Beauvarlet-Charpentier
- Jean-Jacques Beauvarlet-Charpentier
- Alexandre Pierre François Boëly
- Jean-Baptiste Charbonnier
- Michel Corrette
- Armand-Louis Couperin
- Guillaume Lasceux
- Jean-Nicolas Marrigues
- Jean-Baptiste Nôtre
- Louis-Nicolas Séjan
- Nicolas Séjan

=== Romantic ===
- Augustin Barié
- Édouard Batiste
- Erik Satie
- François Benoist
- Hector Berlioz
- Émile Bernard
- Léon Boëllmann
- Joseph-Ermend Bonnal
- Joseph Boulnois
- Henri Büsser
- Alexandre Eugène Cellier
- Charles-Alexis Chauvet
- Henri Dallier
- Léonce de Saint-Martin
- Théodore Dubois
- Paul Fauchet
- Félix Fourdrain
- César Franck (born in Belgium)
- Dynam-Victor Fumet
- Eugène Gigout
- Alexandre Guilmant
- Charles Koechlin
- Maurice Le Boucher
- Louis James Alfred Lefébure-Wély
- Henri Letocart
- Clément Loret (born in Belgium)
- Lazare-Auguste Maquaire
- Édouard Mignan
- Henri Mulet
- Henri Nibelle
- Gabriel Pierné
- Albert Renaud
- Marcel Samuel-Rousseau
- Camille Saint-Saëns
- Alphonse Schmitt
- Déodat de Séverac
- Charles-Marie Widor

=== 20^{th}–21^{st} centuries ===
- Albert Alain
- Jehan Alain
- Paul Allix
- Valéry Aubertin
- Dom Paul Benoit, OSB
- Jacques Berthier
- Jean Marie Berveiller
- Joseph Bonnet
- Michel Boulnois
- Pierre Camonin
- Pierre Cochereau
- Jean-Yves Daniel-Lesur
- Claire Delbos (Louise-Justine Messiaen, née Delbos)
- Jeanne Demessieux
- Marcel Dupré
- Maurice Duruflé
- Rolande Falcinelli
- André Fleury
- Jean-Louis Florentz
- Jean Françaix
- Raphaël Fumet
- Jean-Jacques Grunenwald
- Jean Guillou
- Naji Hakim (born in Lebanon)
- André Jolivet
- Jean Langlais
- Jean-Pierre Leguay
- Gaston Litaize
- Olivier Messiaen
- Guy Morançon
- Thierry Pallesco
- Poulenc
- Henriette Puig-Roget
- Eugène Reuchsel
- Jean-Baptiste Robin
- Daniel Roth
- Pierre Pincemaille
- Charles Tournemire
- Louis Vierne
- René Vierne

== Germany ==
(See also Austria)

=== Renaissance ===
- Elias Ammerbach
- Hans Buchner
- Christian Erbach
- Hans Leo Hassler
- Jakob Hassler
- Leonhard Kleber
- Hans Kotter
- Conrad Paumann
- Hieronymus Praetorius
- Arnolt Schlick
- Johannes (or Johann) Weck [Hüssler]

=== Baroque ===
- Johann Friedrich Alberti
- Johann Sebastian Bach
- Georg Böhm
- Nicolaus Bruhns
- Arnold Brunckhorst
- Johann Heinrich Buttstett
- Dieterich Buxtehude (born in Denmark)
- Andreas Düben
- Johann Ernst Eberlin
- Daniel Erich
- Johann Caspar Ferdinand Fischer
- Johann Philipp Förtsch
- Johann Jakob Froberger
- Christian Geist
- Georg Friedrich Händel
- Johann Nikolaus Hanff
- Peter Hasse
- Wilhelm Karges
- Johann Caspar Kerll
- Johann Erasmus Kindermann
- Andreas Kneller
- Johann Ludwig Krebs
- Johann Tobias Krebs
- Johann Krieger
- Johann Kuhnau
- Georg Dietrich Leyding
- Vincent Lübeck
- Johann Mattheson
- Franz Xaver Murschhauser
- Johann Pachelbel
- Jacob Praetorius
- Michael Praetorius
- Johann Adam Reincken
- Christian Ritter
- Heinrich Scheidemann
- Gottfried Scheidt
- Samuel Scheidt
- Sebastian Anton Scherer
- Melchior Schildt
- Heinrich Schütz
- Paul Siefert
- Johann Speth
- Johann Staden
- Johann Steffens
- Johann Ulrich Steigleder
- Delphin Strungk
- Franz Tunder
- Nicolaus Vetter
- Johann Gottfried Walther
- Georg Caspar Wecker
- Matthias Weckmann
- Andreas Werckmeister
- Friedrich Wilhelm Zachow

=== Classical ===
- Carl Philipp Emanuel Bach
- Johann Ernst Eberlin
- Johann Wilhelm Hertel
- Gottfried August Homilius
- Johann Christian Kittel
- Justin Heinrich Knecht
- Christian Heinrich Rinck

=== Romantic ===
- Johannes Brahms
- Anton Bruckner
- Immanuel Faisst
- Hans Fährmann
- Adolf Friedrich Hesse
- Sigfrid Karg-Elert
- Theodor Kirchner
- Franz Paul Lachner
- Felix Mendelssohn
- Gustav Merkel
- Wilhelm Middelschulte
- Julius Reubke
- Josef Rheinberger (born in Liechtenstein)
- August Gottfried Ritter
- Robert Schumann
- Waldemar von Baußnern
- Max Wagenknecht
- Alexander Winterberger
- Philipp Wolfrum

=== 20^{th}–21^{st} centuries ===
- Joseph Ahrens
- Juan Allende-Blin (born in Chile)
- Peter Bares
- Max Baumann
- Jürg Baur
- Hugo Distler
- Max Drischner
- Zsolt Gárdonyi (born in Hungary)
- Harald Genzmer
- Joseph Haas
- Peter Michael Hamel
- Kurt Hessenberg
- Paul Hindemith
- Karl Höller
- Bertold Hummel
- Werner Jacob
- Mauricio Kagel (born in Argentina)
- Heinrich Kaminski
- Tilo Medek
- Ernst Pepping
- Günter Raphael
- Max Reger
- Mathias Rehfeldt
- Wolfgang Rihm
- Dieter Schnebel
- Hermann Schroeder
- Reinhard Schwarz-Schilling
- Johanna Senfter
- Gerhard Stäbler
- Wolfgang Stockmeier
- Heinz Wunderlich
- Gerd Zacher
- Ruth Zechlin

== Hungary ==
=== Romantic ===
- Franz Liszt

=== 20^{th}–21^{st} centuries ===
- Dezső Antalffy-Zsiross
- Zoltán Gárdonyi
- György Ligeti
- Zsigmond Szathmáry

== Israel ==
=== 20^{th}–21^{st} centuries ===
- Josef Tal

== Italy ==
=== Renaissance ===
- Vincenzo Bellavere
- Sperindio Bertoldo
- Jacques Buus (born in Belgium)
- Marc'Antonio Cavazzoni
- Girolamo Cavazzoni
- Giovanni de Macque (born in Netherlands)
- Girolamo Diruta
- Giacomo Fogliano
- Andrea Gabrieli
- Giovanni Gabrieli
- Luzzasco Luzzaschi
- Ascanio Mayone
- Claudio Merulo
- Annibale Padovano
- Girolamo Parabosco
- Rocco Rodio
- Giulio Segni
- Antonio Valente
- Claudio Veggio
- Adrian Willaert (born in Belgium)

=== Baroque ===
- Girolamo Frescobaldi
- Gaetano Greco
- Tarquinio Merula
- Pietro Domenico Paradisi
- Bernardo Pasquini
- Michelangelo Rossi
- Giovanni Salvatore
- Alessandro Scarlatti
- Domenico Scarlatti
- Bernardo Storace
- Giovanni Maria Trabaci
- Domenico Zipoli (emigrated to Córdoba, Peru: in present-day Argentina)

=== Classical ===
- Padre Davide da Bergamo
- Domenico Cimarosa
- Fedele Fenaroli
- Baldassarre Galuppi
- Giacomo Insanguine
- Niccolò Jommelli
- Giovanni Battista Martini
- Antonio Salieri
- Giuseppe Sarti

=== Romantic ===
- Giulio Bas
- Marco Enrico Bossi
- Filippo Capocci
- Giovanni Morandi
- Oreste Ravanello
- Giovanni Tebaldini

=== 20^{th}–21^{st} centuries ===
- Mario Castelnuovo-Tedesco
- Roberto Carnevale

== Japan ==
- Shigeru Kan-no

== Korea ==
- Isang Yun

== Latvia ==
- Aivars Kalējs
- Pēteris Vasks

== Lithuania ==
- Mikalojus Konstantinas Čiurlionis
- Juozas Naujalis

== Mexico ==
- Miguel Bernal Jiménez
- Alfonso de Elías
- Mario Lavista

== Netherlands ==
=== Renaissance ===
- Hendrik Speuy
- Jan Pieterszoon Sweelinck

=== Baroque ===
- Gisbert Steenwick
- Anthoni van Noordt

=== Romantic ===
- Johannes Gijsbertus Bastiaans
- Richard Hol
- Samuel de Lange Jr.
- Edouard Silas
- Jan Albert van Eijken
- Johan Wagenaar

=== 20^{th}–21^{st} centuries ===
- Hendrik Andriessen
- Henk Badings
- Ton de Leeuw
- Piet Kee
- Daan Manneke
- Fred Momotenko
- Jan Mul
- Herman Strategier
- Simeon ten Holt
- Willem van Twillert
- Jan Vriend
- Ad Wammes

== Norway ==
=== Romantic ===
- Johannes Haarklou
- Peter Brynie Lindeman

=== 20^{th}–21^{st} centuries ===
- Magnar Åm
- Egil Hovland
- Kjell Mørk Karlsen
- Trond Kverno
- Knut Nystedt
- Arild Sandvold

== Peru ==
- Domenico Zipoli (emigrated to Córdoba, Peru from Italy)

== The Philippines ==
- Marcelo Adonay

== Poland ==
=== Renaissance ===
- Nicolaus Cracoviensis
- Jan of Lublin

=== Baroque ===
- Adam of Wągrowiec

=== Classical ===
- Karol Kurpiński

=== Romantic ===
- Wojciech Albert Sowiński (1803 or 1805 – 1880)
- Konstanty Gorski
- August Freyer
- Stanisław Moniuszko
- Feliks Nowowiejski
- Władysław Żeleński

=== 20^{th}–21^{st} centuries ===
- Grażyna Bacewicz
- Augustyn Bloch
- Karol Hławiczka
- Jan Adam Maklakiewicz
- Marian Sawa
- Bolesław Szabelski
- Aleksander Szeligowski
- Karol Szymanowski
- Alexandre Tansman
- Elżbieta Sikora
- Paweł Łukaszewski
- Zygmunt Krauze
- Bolesław Woytowicz
- Wojciech Widłak

== Portugal ==
(see also Spain)

=== Renaissance ===
- António Carreira
- Manuel Rodrigues Coelho

=== Baroque ===
- Carlos Seixas

=== Classical ===
- João de Sousa Carvalho

=== 20^{th}–21^{st} centuries ===
- Luís de Freitas Branco

== Romania ==
=== 20^{th}–21^{st} centuries ===
- Christian Wilhelm Berger

== Russia ==
=== Romantic ===
- Alexander Glazunov
- Alexander Goedicke

=== 20^{th}–21^{st} centuries ===
- Fred Momotenko (Russian-Dutch composer)
- Mikael Tariverdiev (born in Georgia)
- Valeri Kikta (born in Ukraine)

== Slovakia ==
=== Romantic ===
- Ján Levoslav Bella
- Mikuláš Schneider-Trnavský
- Franz Schmidt (active in Austria)

=== 20^{th}–21^{st} centuries ===
- Viliam Figuš-Bystrý
- Alexander Moyzes
- Juraj Beneš
- Ilja Zeljenka
- Peter Machajdik
- Marián Varga

== South Africa ==
=== 20^{th}–21^{st} centuries ===
- Stefans Grové

== Spain ==
(see also Portugal)

=== Renaissance ===
- Francisco Correa de Arauxo
- Antonio de Cabezón
- Sebastian Aguilera de Heredia
- Tomás de Santa María

=== Baroque ===
- Pablo Bruna
- Juan Cabanilles
- Antonio Martín y Coll
- José Ximénez

=== Classical ===
- Pedro Carrera y Lanchares
- José Lidón
- Antonio Soler

=== Romantic ===
- Eduardo Torres

=== 20^{th}–21^{st} centuries ===
- Jesús Guridi

== Sweden ==
=== Baroque ===
- Andreas Düben

=== Romantic ===
- Elfrida Andrée
- Gustaf Hägg
- Oskar Lindberg
- Otto Olsson
- Emil Sjögren

=== 20^{th}–21^{st} centuries ===
- Olle Elgenmark
- Hans-Ola Ericsson
- Bengt Hambraeus
- Torsten Nilsson
- Hilding Rosenberg
- Fredrik Sixten
- Erland von Koch

== Switzerland ==
=== Renaissance ===
- Fridolin Sicher

=== 20^{th}–21^{st} centuries ===
- Alfred Baum
- Conrad Beck
- Ernest Bloch
- Guy Bovet
- Adolf Brunner
- Willy Burkhard
- Bernard Reichel
- Lionel Rogg
- Bernhard Ruchti
- Carl Rütti

== Ukraine ==
- Mykola Kolessa
- Valentin Bibik
- Dmitry Bortniansky
- Reinhold Glière
- Mykola Kolessa
- Zhanna Kolodub
- Bohdan Kotyuk
- Roman Krasnovsky (emigrated to Israel)
- Leonid Nikolayev (pianist)
- Piotr Perkowski
- Alexander Shchetynsky
- Vladimir Tarnopolsky
- Karmella Tsepkolenko

== United Kingdom ==
=== Renaissance ===
- Hugh Aston
- William Byrd
- Orlando Gibbons
- William Inglot
- John Lugge
- (John?) Newman
- Thomas Preston
- John Redford
- Thomas Tallis
- Thomas Tomkins

=== Baroque ===
- John Blow
- Jeremiah Clarke
- William Croft
- Henry Purcell

=== Classical ===
- William Boyce
- Benjamin Cooke
- John Stanley

=== Romantic ===
- Walter Galpin Alcock
- Edward Bairstow
- Herbert Brewer
- E.T. Cook
- Edward Elgar
- Basil Harwood
- Gustav Holst
- John Ireland
- Hubert Parry
- Ronald Richardson Potter
- Henry Smart
- John Stainer
- Charles Villiers Stanford (born in Ireland)
- William Litton Viner
- Samuel Sebastian Wesley
- William Wolstenholme
- Charles Wood

=== 20^{th}–21^{st} centuries ===
- Lennox Berkeley
- Jonathan Bielby
- Judith Bingham
- Hugh Blair
- Nimrod Borenstein (born in Israel)
- Frank Bridge
- David Briggs
- James Francis Brown
- Andrew Carter
- Lawrence Crane
- Harold Darke
- David Gwerfyl Davies
- Peter Maxwell Davies
- Peter Dickinson
- James Douglas
- George Dyson
- Michael Finnissy
- Graham Fitkin
- Percy Fletcher
- Sebastian Forbes
- Peter Fribbins
- Patrick Gowers
- Thomas Vernon Griffiths
- William Henry Harris
- Derek Healey
- Alfred Hollins
- Herbert Howells
- Peter Hurford
- Francis Jackson
- Gabriel Jackson
- Craig Sellar Lang (born in New Zealand)
- Kenneth Leighton
- William Lloyd Webber
- William Mathias
- Peter McGarr
- Herbert Murrill
- Harrison Oxley
- Ian Parrott
- Paul Patterson
- Francis Pott
- Simon Preston
- Alan Ridout
- Martin Shaw
- Kaikhosru Shapurji Sorabji
- Christopher Steel
- Herbert Sumsion
- George Thalben-Ball (born in Australia)
- Eric Thiman
- Ralph Vaughan Williams
- Percy Whitlock
- Malcolm Williamson (born in Australia)
- Arthur Wills

== United States ==
=== Romantic ===
- Dudley Buck
- George Whitefield Chadwick
- Arthur Foote
- Charles Ives
- John Knowles Paine
- Horatio Parker
- Fela Sowande
- Frank Speller
- Whitney Eugene Thayer

=== 20^{th}–21^{st} centuries ===
- Carol Williams
- Samuel Adler
- Miguel del Águila
- William Albright
- George C. Baker
- Samuel Barber
- Edward Shippen Barnes
- Herman Berlinski
- Seth Bingham
- Roberta Bitgood
- William Bolcom
- John Cage
- Clay Christiansen
- Joseph W. Clokey
- David Conte
- Carson Cooman
- Aaron Copland
- David Dahl
- Pamela Decker
- Emma Lou Diemer
- Robert Elmore
- Isadore Freed
- Philip Glass
- Calvin Hampton
- John Harbison
- Alan Hovhaness
- David N. Johnson
- Paul Manz
- Haruhito Miyagi
- Charlemagne Palestine
- Stephen Paulus
- Vincent Persichetti
- Daniel Pinkham
- Robert Powell
- Richard Purvis
- Steve Reich
- Terry Riley
- Ned Rorem
- John Serry Sr.
- Leo Sowerby
- Tomáš Svoboda (composer) (French-born Czech-American)
- Giles Swayne
- Virgil Thomson
- Gwyneth Walker
- Dale Wood
- Charles Wuorinen
- Pietro Yon (born in Italy)
- Richard Zarou

== Uruguay ==
- Miguel del Águila (emigrated to the U.S.)
- Pedro Ipuche Riva
- Beatriz Lockhart
- Héctor Tosar

== See also ==
- Organ repertoire
- Organ (music)
- List of Anglican church composers

== Sources ==
- A Directory of Composers for Organ by Dr. John Henderson, Hon. Librarian to the Royal School of Church Music, 2005, 3rd edition. ISBN 0-9528050-2-2
- Eleanor Selfridge-Field, Venetian Instrumental Music, from Gabrieli to Vivaldi. New York, Dover Publications, 1994. ISBN 0-486-28151-5
- Christopher S. Anderson (Ed.), Twentieth-Century Organ Music. New York, Routledge, 2012, ISBN 0-415-87566-8
