= Leonhard Kleber =

German organist (c. 1495 – 1556)

- Born: c. 1495; Göppingen, Duchy of Württemberg, Holy Roman Empire
- Died: 4 March 1556 (aged 60–61); Pforzheim, Duchy of Württemberg, Holy Roman Empire
- Education: Heidelberg University
- Occupations: Organist; composer; music educator
- Years active: 1510s–1550s
- Era: Renaissance
- Style: Classical

Leonhard Kleber (c. 1495 – 4 March 1556) was a German organist, and probably composer, during the Renaissance.

He was born in Göppingen. He graduated from Heidelberg University in 1512 and was probably a pupil of the famous blind organist and composer Arnolt Schlick around that time. He is known to have held three positions after his graduation: at Horb am Neckar, as organist and vicar-choral, in 1516 and 1517; at Esslingen am Neckar as organist until 1521; and at Pforzheim from 1521 on, where he was organist at the collegiate and parish church. During this period, he had numerous organ students and was evidently renowned as a teacher. He died in Pforzheim.

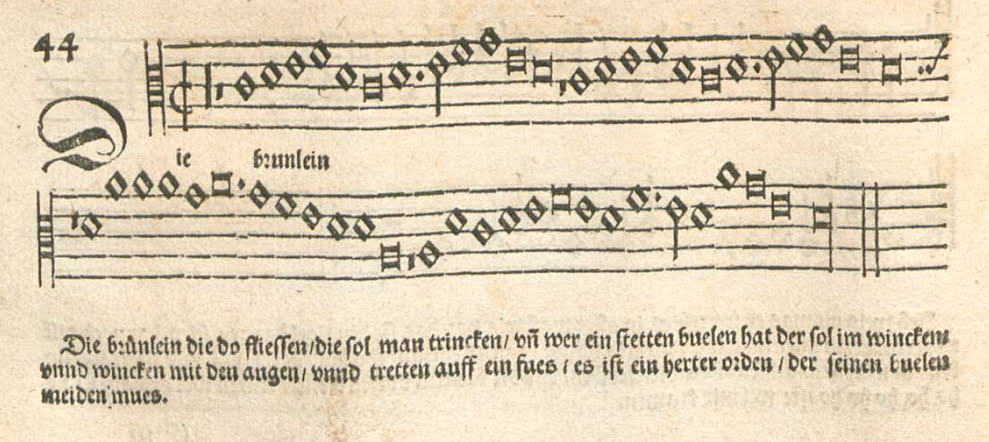
Kleber's setting of "Die Brünnlein, die da fließen" ('The little springs that flow there'), published by Hans Ott, Nuremberg, 1534, No. 44

In 1524, Kleber produced his most famous work, a huge tablature containing 112 separate compositions, mostly by other composers. It was compiled between 1521 and 1524 and contains 332 pages; several hands are identifiable in the manuscript, though none have been identified. None of the music is attributed to its composer, although most has been identified; some of the anonymous pieces may be by Kleber himself. Composers represented in the tablature include Paul Hofhaimer, Hayne van Ghizeghem, Heinrich Isaac, Josquin des Prez, Jacob Obrecht, Antoine Brumel, Heinrich Finck, Ludwig Senfl, and Hans Buchner, as well as others. Many of the compositions were originally written for voices, especially those by the Franco-Flemish composers (for example, Josquin, Isaac, Obrecht, and Brumel); some of the music by German organists, such as Hofhaimer and Buchner, was probably written for organ, and hence is contained in the tablature in its original form.

This huge early Reformation-era collection is one of the earliest large collections of organ music, and is unusual both for its size and inclusiveness, containing both sacred and secular music in arrangement.
