= Adolphe Marty =

French organist, composer, improviser and music educator (1865-1942)

- Born: 29 September 1865; Albi, France
- Died: 28 October 1942 (aged 77); Valence-d'Albigeois, France
- Education: Conservatoire de Paris
- Occupations: Organist; Composer; Music educator

Adolphe Alexandre Silvain Marty (29 September 1865 – 28 October 1942) was a French organist, improviser, composer and music educator who was blind for most of his life.

== Early life and education ==
Born in Albi in the Tarn department in the south of France, Marty became blind at the age of two and a half years. He entered the Institut National des Jeunes Aveugles in Paris in 1874 and worked the organ with Louis Lebel (1831–1888).

From 1884 to 1886 he studied music composition with Ernest Guiraud and pipe organ with César Franck at the Conservatoire de Paris, winning the first prize for organ in 1886, the first blind person to do so.

== Career ==
In 1888 Marty succeeded Louis Lebel as organ teacher at the Institut National des Jeunes Aveugles, where he taught until 1930. His students included Louis Vierne, Augustin Barié, Paul Allix, André Marchal, Jean Langlais and Gaston Litaize. Léonce de Saint-Martin also worked with him privately.

Marty served as organist of Saint-Paul d'Orléans church from 1887 to 1888. In 1891 he succeed Albert Renaud as organist of Saint-François-Xavier church in Paris, a position he held until 1941.

He was closely linked to the organ builder Puget, inaugurating a number of their instruments, including the organ of Albi Cathedral on 20 November 1904.

Marty died in Valence-d'Albigeois in the Tarn department on 28 October 1942.

== Compositions ==
=== Organ ===
- L'Orgue triomphal, 12 pieces in two books (A. Noël, Paris, 1898), including the famous Carillon de Saint-Paul d'Orléans (on the program of Vierne's 1927 North American tour).
  - 1. Entrée pour l'Assomption "Triomphez, Reine des Cieux" - 2. Marche - 3. Entrée pour Noël (noël Breton varié) - 4. Fugue brève - 5. Sortie pour le jour de Pâques Ite missa est - 6. Le Carillon de Saint-Paul d'Orléans - 7. Marche - 8. Grand Chœur pour l'Ascension sur la prose Solemnis haec festivitas - 9. Sortie pour une fête patronale - 10. Pour la Fête-Dieu. Entrée ou marche de procession "Lauda Sion" - 11. Pour la fête de Noël. Sortie sur un noël ancien - 12. Fantaisie
- 10 Pièces en style libre pour grand orgue, in 2 books (A. Noël, 1900) :
  - 1. À ton autel, incomparable reine, Offertoire pour les fêtes de la Sainte Vierge - 2. À vos genoux l'Église se prosterne, Offertoire pour les fêtes de la Sainte Vierge – 3. Communion – 4. Nous consacrons tout à Marie, thème varié – 5. Pièce symphonique – 6. Fantaisie sur deux cantiques – 7. Andante et Fugue – 8. Thème varié – 9. Magnificat pour le jour de Noël, variations sur le cantique Le Fils du Roi de gloire - 10. Sion, de ta mélodie cesse les divins accords, Caprice.
- 5 Pièces pour Grand Orgue (A. Noël, Paris) : 1. Caprice - 2. Angelus du Soir (Méditation) - 3. Canzona - 4. Pastorale - 5. Marche Funèbre
- 6 Pièces pour les différentes fêtes de l'année (A. Noël, Paris)
- 6 Pièces pour orgue avec pédale ad libitum, Op. 23 (Biton)
- Sonate no 1 "La Pentecôte"
- Sonate héroïque "Sainte Cécile" (1904) : I. Extase – II. Chant d'Hyménée – III. Entretien et conversion – IV. Triomphe et Apothéose. Composée pour l'inauguration de l'orgue Puget de la cathédrale Sainte-Cécile d'Albi.
- L'Art de la Pédale du Grand Orgue. (Combre, Paris)
- Offertoire, Grand chœur pour la Pentecôte, in Les Maîtres contemporains de l'orgue, vol. 2, by abbott Joseph Joubert, 1912.

=== Motets ===
- Regina Mundi for tenor and organ, violin and harp ad lib. Op. 28 (Combre)
- Tu es Petrus, No 3 du Salut, for 4 men's voices and organ, Op. 31 (Combre)
- Angeli et Pastores (Christmas), for mixed choir, oboe, harp and organ (A. Noël, 1902)

=== Chamber music ===
- Fantaisie no 1 for clarinet and piano (Leduc, Paris)

== Discography ==
- Adolphe Marty, Œuvres choisies, by Marie-Thérèse Jehan, on the Cavaillé-Coll organ of the abbey church of Saint-Sever (Landes); Éditions Lade EL CD 025.

== Sources ==
- Dermogloste Biographical notes and photo; creation of the Sonate héroïque Sainte Cécile à Albi.
- France Orgue Discographie established by Alain Cartayrade
- Orgues de France Le grand orgue de l'église Saint-François-Xavier, Paris.
