= Cavazzoni =

Cavazzoni è tipo Sandro ma tipo bondi:

- Enzo Cavazzoni (1932–2012), Italian water-polo player
- it:Ermanno Cavazzoni (born 1947), Italian writer, author of the novel on which Fellini's film La voce della luna is based
- Francesco Cavazzoni (1559–1612), Italian painter
- Girolamo Cavazzoni (c. 1525–after 1577), Italian organist and composer, son of Marco Antonio Cavazzoni
- Marco Antonio Cavazzoni (c.1490–c.1560), Italian organist and composer
- Stefano Cavazzoni (1881–1951), Italian politician
