= Verso (disambiguation) =

Verso is the left-hand page of a folded sheet or bound item, such as a book, broadsheet, or pamphlet.

Verso may also refer to:

== Fictional characters ==
- Verso, an important character in the video game Clair Obscur: Expedition 33.
  - Verso Dessendre, an important character in the video game Clair Obscur: Expedition 33.

== Music ==
- Verso (music), genre of the verset or alternatim in Iberian organ music

== Toyota cars in Europe ==
- Toyota Yaris Verso, a mini MPV
- Toyota Corolla Verso, a compact MPV
- Toyota Verso, a compact MPV, the successor to the Corolla Verso
- Toyota Avensis Verso, a mid-size MPV

== Publishing, games and business ==
- Verso Books, a book publishing company specialising in books about left-wing politics
- Verso Corporation, a pulp and paper company

== People ==
- Antonio il Verso (1565–1621), Italian composer
- Enrico Lo Verso (born 1964), Italian actor

== Military ==
- A verso is a type of Breech-loading swivel gun
