= Bernhard Ycart =

Bernar, Bernardus or Bernhard Ycart, also Hycart, Hycaert, Icart, Ycaert (active in the late 15th century) was a Flemish or possibly Catalan composer and theorist based at the Aragonese court in Naples. Originally assumed to be Flemish, like many Oltremontani musicians in Italy, sources such as Historia de la música española (1983) advance that Ycart was probably a native Catalan or Aragonese.

His small number of surviving works include five pieces (three Magnificats, a Gloria and a Kyrie) from the Codex Faenza, a set of three Lamentaciones preserved in Naples, and a single motet O princeps Pilate from the Cancionero de Montecassino. Additionally a French chanson Non toches a moy has been ascribed to Ycart.
