= Augustin Barié =

French musician

Augustin Charles Barié (15 November 1883 – 22 August 1915) was a French composer and organist.

== Biography ==
Barié was born in Paris as the only son of architect Charles-Maximin Henri Barié and Victorine Eugénie Petit and was blind from birth; however, he had large hands which spanned an eleventh, allowing him to play the difficult organ works of composers such as César Franck with relative ease.

He studied at the Institut National des Jeunes Aveugles under Adolphe Marty and Louis Vierne, then went on to study with Alexandre Guilmant at the Paris Conservatory. In 1906, he was awarded the Conservatory's premier prix. He then became organist at St Germain-des-Prés in Paris, as well as professor of organ at the Institut National des Jeunes Aveugles. Barié was a celebrated improviser, one of a long line of French Romantic virtuoso organists, and he wrote mostly for organ, including a Symphony (Op. 5) and Trois Pieces (Op. 7).

On 12 December 1912, he married his fiancée Jeanne-Marie Victoire Joséphine Favier (born 12 March 1886 in Chambéry). On 9 March 1914, their only son Jehan Charles Victor was born in the 7th arrondissement of Paris.

His career was cut short when he died of a brain hemorrhage in Antony, France at the age of 31. His son survived him until 1917, and his widow died on 5 October 1954 in Domessin.

The family are buried together in Chambéry, where they once lived.

== Recordings ==
- Germaine Labole & Augustin Barié - Œuvres d'Orgue, Julian Bewig, organ (classicophon.com, 2008)
- La Toccata, André Marchal - Institut des jeunes aveugles, 1975 FY P1
- L'Œuvre pour orgue, Marie-Thérèse Jehan - Solstice SOCD-17
- Intégrale de l'œuvre pour orgue, Véronique Le Guen - B000GIWTPA

== Media ==
Toccata in B minor, Op. 7
