= Hans Kotter =

German composer

Hans Kotter, sometimes given as Hans Cotter, Hans Kotterer, or Hans Kotther, (1480–1541) was a German composer and organist of the Renaissance. Although organ music was not popular or enthusiastically supported in Strasbourg in the early Reformation years, the first known organ chorales were composed by Kotter.

== Life and career ==
Hans Kotter was born in Strasbourg in 1480. Under the patronage of the Frederick III, Elector of Saxony, he trained as an organist under Paul Hofhaimer from 1498-1500. For the next eight years he was organist at the Saxon court at Torgau. This position ended in 1508 when he went to Basel where he met and befriended Bonifacius Amerbach and his family. He planned and copied three important keyboard tablatures for Amberbach. He also spent time with Amberbach at the University of Freiburg in Breisgau.

In 1514 Kotter was appointed organist at the Fribourg Cathedral. He remained there until 1530 when he lost his position due to his authorship of a poem he wrote before 1522 in which he displayed support for Protestantism. Kotter was imprisoned and tortured for his Protestant faith. He was unable to obtain another organist post; largely due to religious persecution. From 1534 he taught as a schoolmaster in Bern. He died there in 1541.

Kotter's three keyboard tablatures, contains the first German organ dances and pieces by Paul Hofhaimer, Josquin des Prez, Heinrich Isaac, and others. Also preserved are ten preludes, which are kept in a somewhat impersonal style, and are close to his teacher Hofhaimer.
