= Arnolt Schlick =

German composer

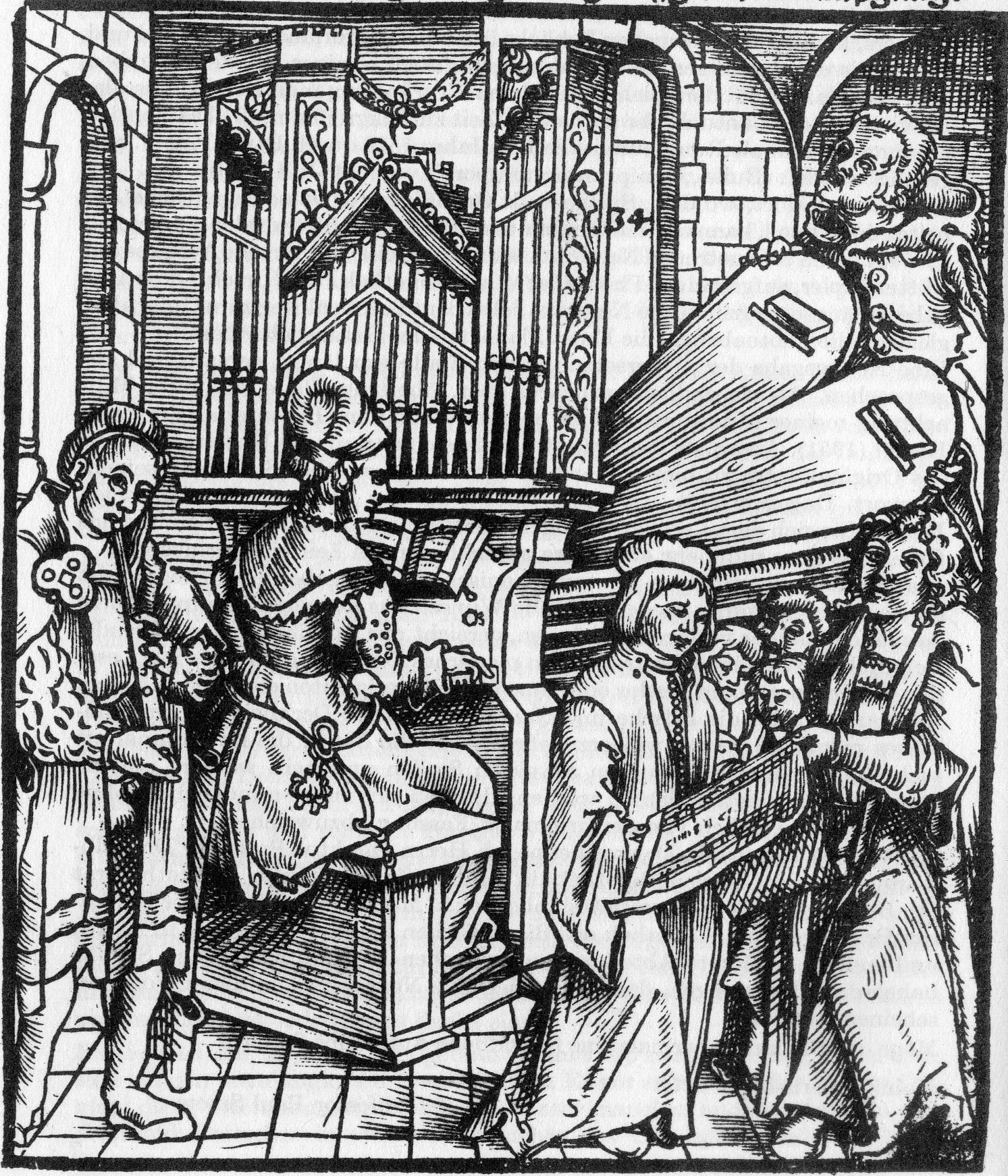
Illustration from the title page of Schlick's Spiegel der Orgelmacher und Organisten (1511), the first German treatise on organ building and performance

Arnolt Schlick (July 18?, c. 1455–1460 – after 1521) was a German organist, lutenist and composer of the Renaissance. He is grouped among the composers known as the Colorists. He was most probably born in Heidelberg and by 1482 established himself as court organist for the Electorate of the Palatinate. Highly regarded by his superiors and colleagues alike, Schlick played at important historical events, such as the election of Maximilian I as King of the Romans, and was widely sought after as organ consultant throughout his career. The last known references to him are from 1521; the circumstances of his death are unknown.

Schlick was blind for much of his life, possibly from birth. However, that did not stop him from publishing his work. He is best known for Spiegel der Orgelmacher und Organisten (1511), the first German treatise on building and playing organs. This work, highly influential during the 16th century, was republished in 1869 and is regarded today as one of the most important books of its kind. Schlick's surviving compositions include Tabulaturen etlicher lobgesang (1512), a collection of organ and lute music, and a few pieces in manuscript. The lute pieces—mostly settings of popular songs—are among the earliest published; but Schlick's organ music is even more historically important. It features sophisticated cantus firmus techniques, multiple truly independent lines (up to five—and, in one case, ten—voices), and extensive use of imitation. Thus, it predates the advances of Baroque music by about a hundred years, making Schlick one of the most important composers in the history of keyboard music.

== Life ==
=== Early life ===
Records of Schlick's early life are sparse: he lived and worked at Heidelberg, which was almost completely destroyed during the War of the Grand Alliance, so almost no records survive from the time Schlick was born. Nevertheless, linguistic analysis of his writings has shown that Schlick was most likely from the area around Heidelberg, and recent research showed that Schlick was most probably born into a family of a Heidelberg butcher, whose family name may have been Slicksupp. If Schlick's parents followed the contemporary German custom to name children after the saint on whose day they were born, Schlick must have been born on July 18, St. Arnold's day. As for the year of birth, since Schlick married in 1482 and described himself as "an old man" by 1520, he was probably born between 1455 and 1460. Schlick was blind for much of his life, and may have been born blind.

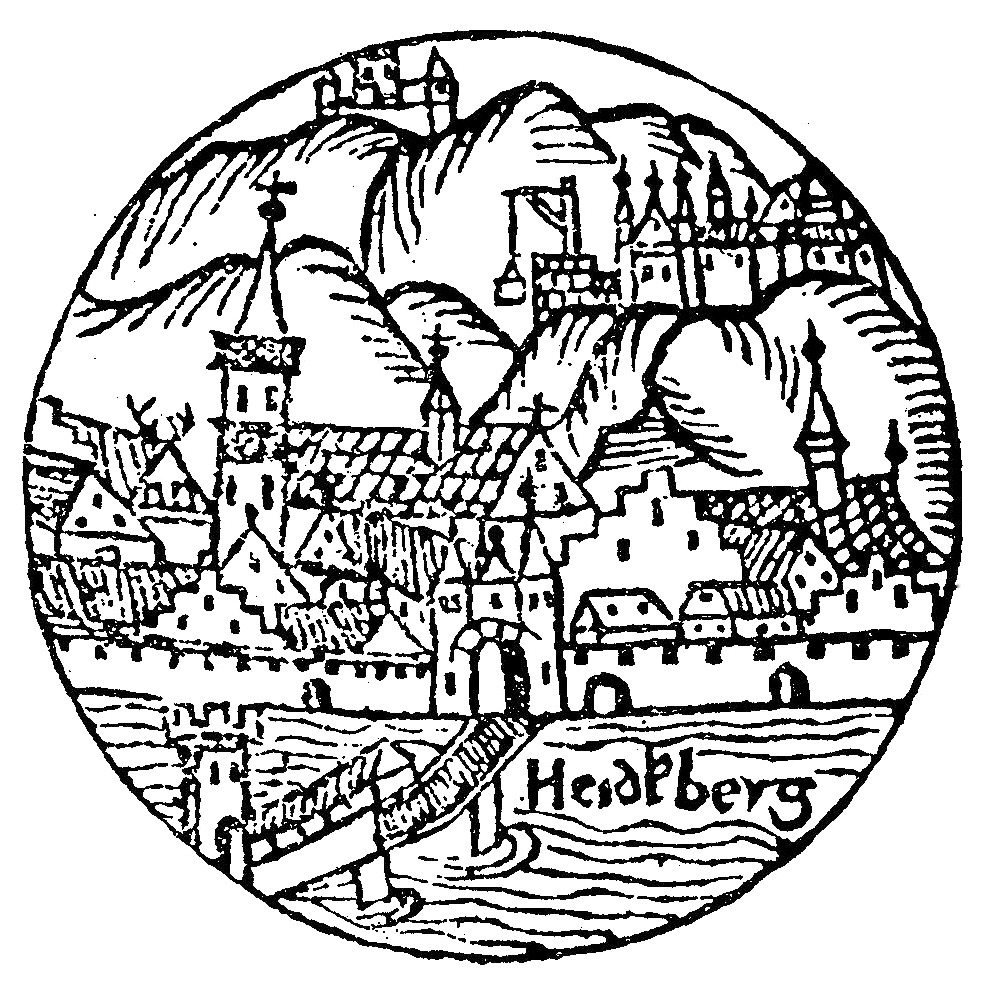
Heidelberg and Heidelberg Castle in 1527. A lightning-bolt destroyed the upper castle in 1537, and many subsequent misfortunes left the place in ruins by the 20th century.

No documents survive concerning Schlick's apprenticeship. Johannes von Soest and an otherwise unknown "Petrus Organista de Oppenheim" could be his teachers, as could Conrad Paumann, if only for a brief time when he (possibly) visited Heidelberg in 1472. The earliest mention of Schlick's place of employment is in his marriage contract: in 1482 he married Barbara Struplerin, a servant of Elector Philip's sons, and the contract lists him as a court organist. Schlick and his family lived in a house on the Burgweg, a path that led to the Heidelberg Castle (although by 1482 Schlick had already inherited his father's house in Heidelberg).

=== Career ===
Schlick was apparently held in very great regard by his superiors. By 1509 he was the highest-paid musician at the court with a salary almost twice as high as that of the next-best-paid musician, and comparable to the salary of the court treasurer. Evidently, this position was already established by 1486, when Schlick performed at the election of Archduke Maximilian as King of the Romans at Frankfurt, on February 16 of that year (Schlick may also have performed at Maximilian's coronation six weeks later). It was at this election that Schlick must have first met Paul Hofhaimer. In either 1489 or 1490 (the precise year is uncertain), Schlick travelled to the Netherlands: he alludes to the journey in his preface to Tabulaturen etlicher lobgesang, but his reasons remain obscure. Recent scholarship unearthed evidence of payments to other Electorate of the Palatinate musicians, made by Utrecht authorities, and although no mention of the court travelling to Utrecht in 1489–1490 has been found, it is entirely possible that such a journey did happen. An older version of Schlick's motives was that he went to the Low Countries to escape from the plague which was then ravaging the Heidelberg area.

In October 1503 King Philip I of Castile visited Heidelberg, bringing with him a large enoutrage that included the composers Pierre de la Rue and Alexander Agricola, and organist Henry Bredemers. Schlick almost certainly met these musicians, and probably played the organ at the performance of the Mass that took place during Philip's visit. The next known contemporary report that mentions Schlick is from February 23, 1511, when he played at the wedding of Louis V, Elector Palatine and Sibylle of Bavaria. Nothing certain is known about Schlick's other performances. We know that he was present at one of the diets at Worms, either in 1509 or at the famous diet of 1495. The presence of an unnamed Heidelberg court lutenist in Basel in 1509 is documented, and as Schlick was an accomplished lutenist, it might have been him. In 1516, Schlick visited Torgau for unknown reasons; he may have played the organ there, and presumably met Hofaimer again, since the latter was Torgau's court organist at the time.

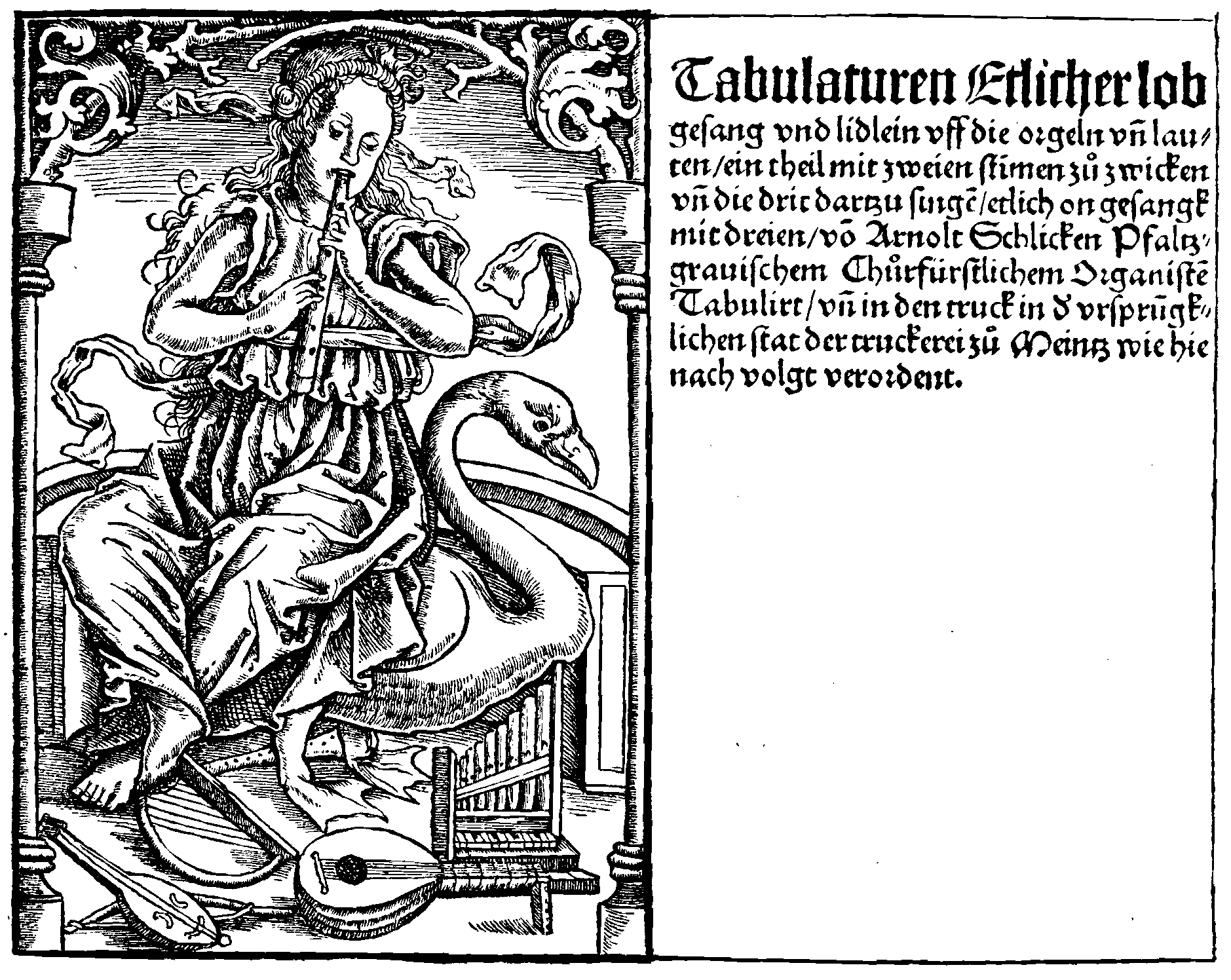
Title page of Schlick's Tabulaturen etlicher lobgesang (1512), a collection of organ and lute pieces.

The year 1511 saw the publication of Schlick's organ treatise, Spiegel der Orgelmacher und Organisten ("Mirror of Organ Builders and Organists"). The book was published in Speyer; it is the first known German treatise on organ building and performance, and was very influential in Germany. Also in 1511, Schlick's son Arnolt the Younger pleaded to his father to publish at least some of his music; the father complied and published Tabulaturen etlicher lobgesang und lidlein uff die orgeln un lauten ("Tablatures of [Several] Canticles and Songs for Organ and Lute") the next year, a collection of organ and lute music. A few of the biographical details are found in the preface to the latter work (which consists of Arnolt the Younger's letter to his father) and Schlick's reply. Schlick writes, for instance, about his journey to the Low Countries, and about the row he had with Sebastian Virdung in either 1495 or 1509. Schlick apparently met Virdung in Worms in 1495 or 1509 and helped him in some way. Some years later, in his treatise Musica getutscht (1511) Virdung ridiculed Schlick's adherence to the view that the black keys should be considered musica ficta, and made rude remarks about the composer's blindness. In the preface to Tabulaturen etlicher lobgesang Schlick retorts with mentions of Virdung's numerous mistakes in the musical examples from Musica getutscht, and condemns Virdung's ingratitude. Schlick also mentions his plans to publish another book of music, but no trace of such a publication is known.

Throughout his life, Schlick was in high demand as an organ consultant. The earliest record of his activity in this field is from 1491, when he inspected the instrument of the Strasbourg Cathedral. Twelve more reports survive about such trips: among others, Schlick passed judgements on organs at St. George's Church, Haguenau, Speyer Cathedral, and the Stiftskirche, Neustadt an der Weinstraße. The last reference to Schlick is from 1521, when he examined an organ at St. George, Haguenau. This job was apparently carried out during December 1520–January 1521, and a letter survives from about the same time, from Schlick to Bernardo Clesio, Bishop of Trent; Schlick sent Clesio two sets of chorale settings. After this, Schlick disappears from history. In 1524 another organist was employed in his place.

== Writings ==
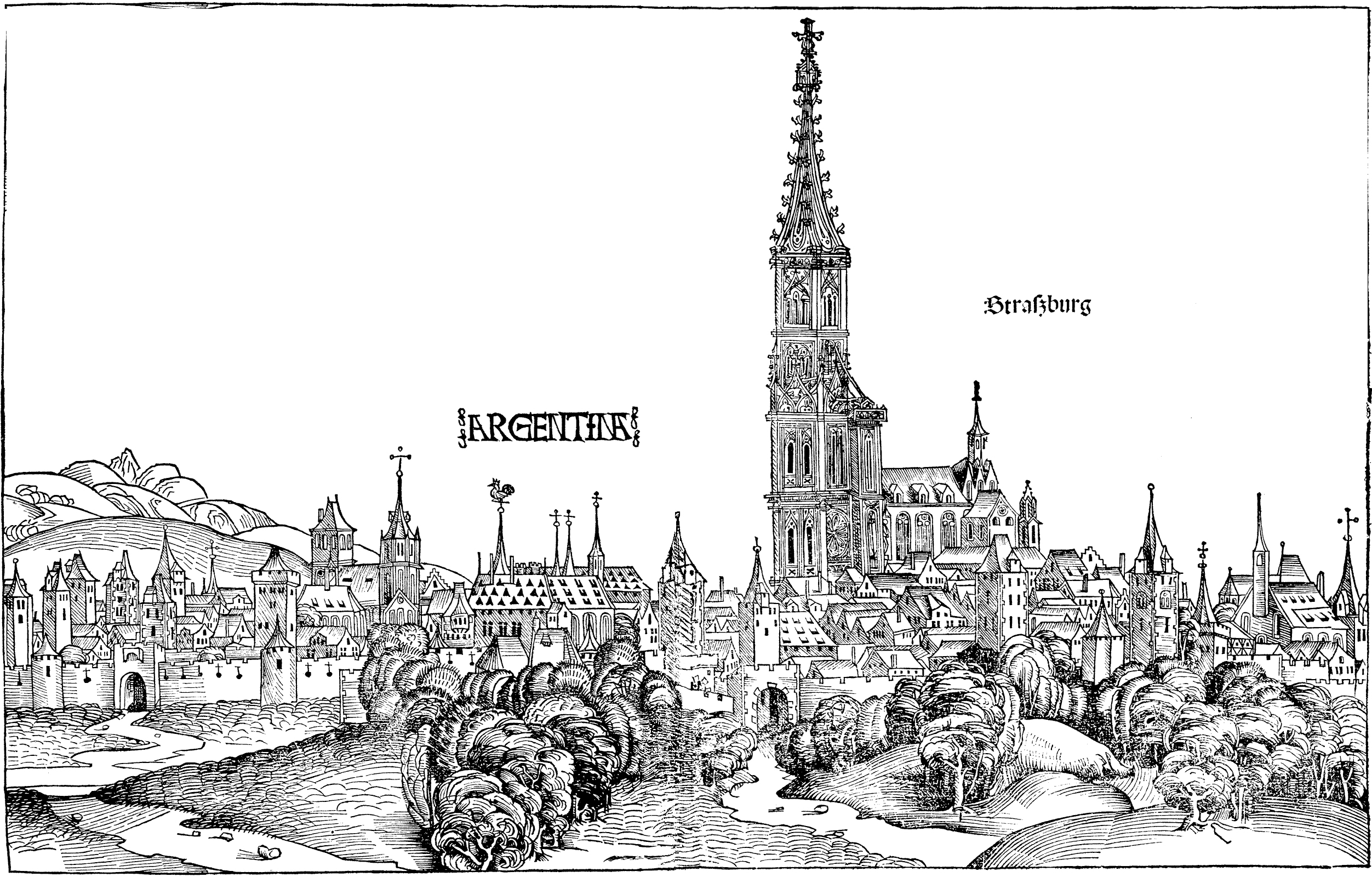
A view of Strasbourg Cathedral from Hartmann Schedel's Weltchronik (Nuremberg 1493). Schlick visited as organ consultant in 1491 and around 1512; Strasbourg was one of the cities where organ builders were probably influenced by Schlick.

Schlick's treatise on organ building and organ playing, Spiegel der Orgelmacher und Organisten ("Mirror of Organ Builders and Organists"), was published in 1511 in Speyer by Peter Drach. Only two copies survive to this day, but the book has long been recognized as one of the most important of its kind. The Spiegel is the earliest German organ treatise, and also the first book on musical matters to enjoy an imperial privilege (issued by Emperor Maximilian to protect Schlick's rights). It was widely influential in Maximilian's empire, but became obsolete towards the 17th century because of the advances in organ building. After years of oblivion, the Spiegel was republished in 1869, and interest in it has been growing ever since: a summary of its contents in modern language was available in 1870, a complete translation into modern German appeared in 1931, a partial English translation first became available in Organ Institute Quarterly, published between 1957 and 1960, and a complete English translation followed in 1980. Facsimile editions of the treatise appeared as early as 1959.

Schlick's book begins with a preface in three parts: the composer first thanks his patrons, then briefly discusses the nature of music, and finally describes the purpose of the Spiegel: it was not intended for organists and/or organ builders, as it may seem from the title, but for those church and monastery authorities who wanted to buy an organ, or had one entrusted to their care. Schlick's remarks about the nature of music are similar to those in other musical treatises of the time: he quotes, like numerous other authors of the period, the Bible, Aristotle, Boethius, Asclepiades of Bithynia and Guido of Arezzo. Quotations from these sources support Schlick's own views: that music has a profound effect on the listeners, and can heal both the body and the spirit. Schlick also praises the organ as the best musical instrument, his argument being that extensive polyphony with as many as six or seven parts can be executed by a single person on the organ.

The preface is followed by ten chapters which cover practically every aspect of organ-building: tuning, keyboard construction, making of chests, bellows, stops, etc.; even the instrument's position in the church and its decorations are discussed (Schlick's point of view being that excessive decorations are undesirable). Among other things, Schlick describes his "ideal" organ, which is a two-manual instrument with eight to ten stops for the Hauptwerk, four for the Rückpositiv, and four in the pedal:

Hauptwerk	Rückpositiv
2- or more rank Principal	Principal (wood pipes)
"long Octave"	small Gemshorn
"wide Gemshorn", an octave above the Principals	small Mixture
Zimbel	Zimbel without Tierce
large chorus mixture
reed stop "imitating a shawm"	Pedal
hůltze gletcher	Principal (from the Hauptwerk)
Zink or Cornett	Octaff
Flageolet, ? of 2'	Octave and Mixture (from the Hauptwerk)
Regal stop	Trompete or Posaune

He emphasizes that each stop should have a distinct sound, easily distinguishable from all others, and that performers should make good use of contrasting registrations. Some of the stops Schlick mentions are difficult to identify precisely, due to the age of the treatise and the changes that took place in organ-building since the 16th century. Perhaps the most mysterious is the hůltze gletcher, a stop with a percussive sound which Schlick admired and compared to "a bowl that idle journeymen hit with spoons." However, Schlick's descriptions of other stops also require interpretation; for example, he describes the Rückpositiv Zimbel with the words "guts reins Zymmelein", "good clean Zimbel" from which later authors infer the lack of Tierce ranks. Schlick's explanations of his "ideal" organ also reveal much about contemporary musical attitudes. For example, he recommends a compass of F-a'' in order to give "a good independent bass line", and he states that the pedal should not consist solely of low sub-octave stops, as this would "invert the harmony", presumably a reference to the increased role of the pedal in playing a cantus firmus melody that was considered to be a tenor line, now freed from its medieval subservience.

The most discussed part of the Spiegel is its second chapter, which concerns organ pitch. To illustrate how an organ should be tuned, Schlick indicates the length of a pipe speaking F, the bottom note of his compass. To this end, a line is printed in the margin, and the length of the pipe is given as being 16 times the length of that line. Numerous estimates have been suggested in the past, and some scholars (most notably Arthur Mendel) actually doubted whether the length of the line in question was rendered correctly during printing. Today, most scholars agree that the pipe would produce a sound slightly more than a whole tone below the present-day F. The temperament Schlick advocates is an irregular one, close to meantone; the major thirds are slightly wider than pure. Schlick rejected keyboards with split accidentals.

== Music ==
=== Organ music ===
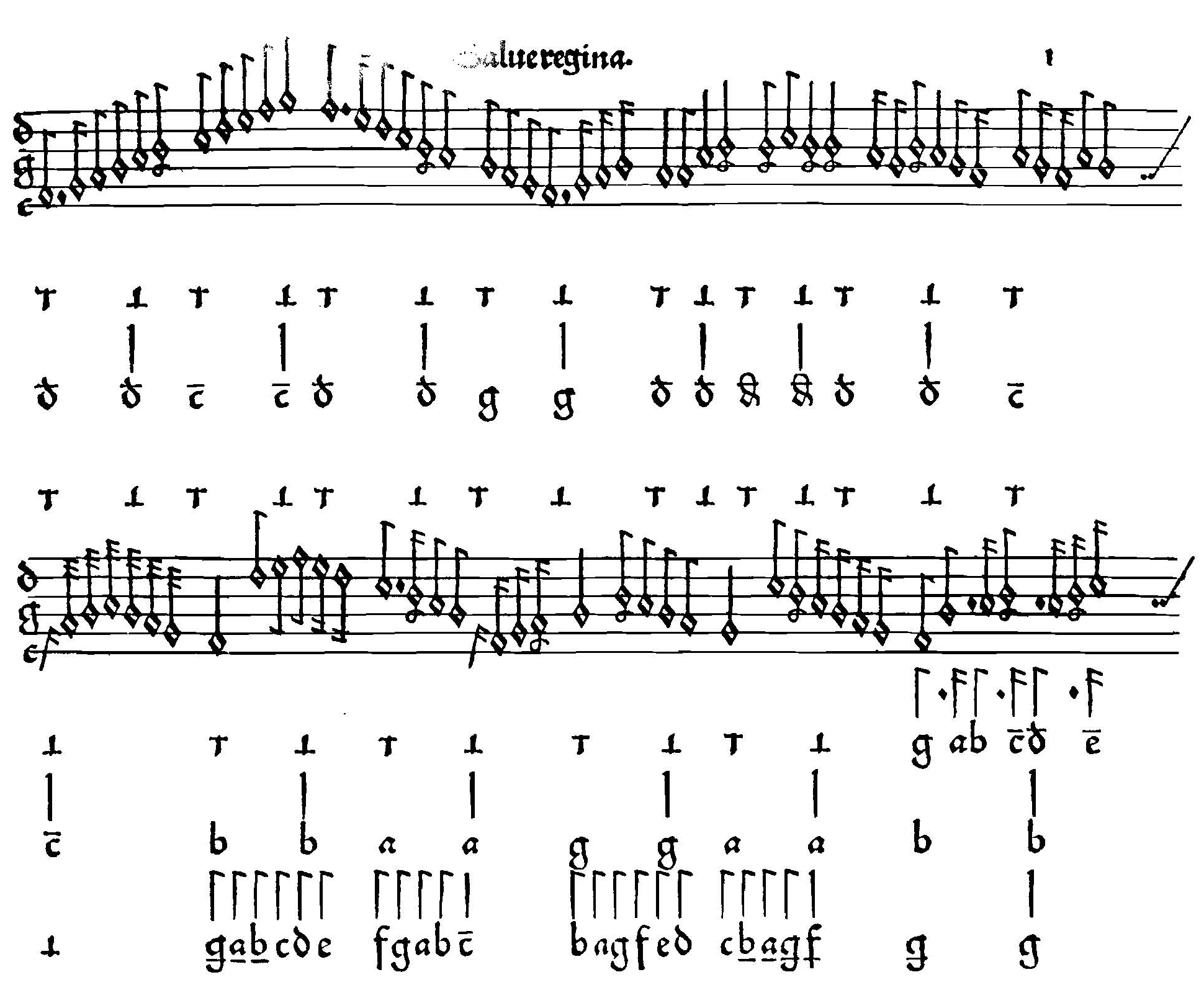
Opening of Salve Regina (facsimile)

Schlick's organ music survives in two sources: the printed collection Tabulaturen etlicher lobgesang (1512) and the letter Schlick sent to Bernardo Clesio around 1520–1521. Tabulaturen contains ten compositions for organ: a setting of Salve Regina (five verses), Pete quid vis, Hoe losteleck, Benedictus, Primi toni, Maria zart, Christe, and three settings of Da pacem. Of these, only Salve Regina and the Da pacem settings are fully authentic. Much of the other music is stylistically indistinguishable from contemporary vocal works by other composers; consequently, some of the pieces may be intabulations of other composers' works. However, as of 2009, no models are known for any of the pieces, and so Schlick's authorship remains undisputed.

The Salve Regina setting is among the most important of Schlick's works. Unlike most preceding and contemporary organ composers, Schlick tends to use four voices rather than three, and in the first verse there are instances of two voices in the pedal, a technique unheard of at the time. Schlick's setting also sets itself apart by relying heavily on imitation, sequence and fragmentation of motives, techniques seldom employed so consistently in organ music of the day. The first movement begins with an imitative exposition of an original theme with an unusually wide (for a theme used imitatively) range of a twelfth and proceeds to free counterpoint with instances of fragments of the original theme. Movements 2 and 3 (Ad te clamamus and Eya ergo) begin by treating the cantus firmus imitatively, and the opening of Eya ergo constitutes one of the earliest examples of fore-imitation:

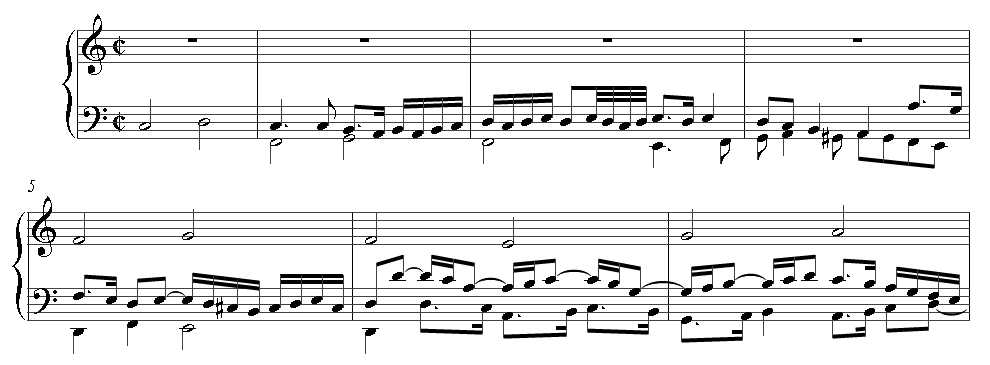

This technique, in which a motif treated imitatively "foreshadows" the entrance of the cantus firmus, later played a major part in the development of the organ chorale. Schlick's methods of creating complementary motives also look towards a much later stage of evolution, namely the techniques employed by Jan Pieterszoon Sweelinck. Early music scholar Willi Apel, who authored the earliest comprehensive analysis of Schlick's keyboard music, writes:

Schlick's Salve is one of the truly great masterpieces of organ art, perhaps the first one to deserve to be so ranked. It still breathes the strict spirit of the Middle Ages, which brought forth so many wonderful works, but new forces are already at work that lend this composition a novel fulness of expression and sound.

Schlick's three Da pacem settings also look to the future, because, although Schlick does not refer to them as a cycle anywhere in the Tabulaturen, the placement of the cantus firmus suggests that the three settings are part of a large plan. The antiphon is in the discantus in the first setting, in the tenor in the second, and in the bass in the third. Similar plans are observed in Sweelinck's and later composers' chorale variations. Technically, Schlick's settings exhibit a contrapuntal technique similar to that of Salve Regina.

Schlick's Benedictus and Christe are three-voice settings of mass movements. The former has been called "the first organ ricercar" because of its use of imitation in a truly fugal manner, but it remains unclear whether the composition is an original piece by Schlick or an intabulation of a vocal work by another composer. The piece is in three sections, the first of which begins with a fugal exposition, and the second is a canon between the outer voices. Schlick's Christe is more loosely constructed: although imitation is used throughout, there are no fugal expositions or canonic techniques employed. The piece begins with a long two-voice section. Other organ pieces in the Tabulaturen employ a variety of methods, most relying on imitation (with the notable exception of Primi toni, which is also unusual for its title, which merely indicates the tone, but not the cantus firmus). For example, Schlick's setting of Maria zart (a German song famously used by Jacob Obrecht for Missa Maria zart, one of the longest polyphonic settings of the Mass Ordinary ever written) splits the melody into thirteen fragments, treated imitatively one by one. A similar procedure, only with longer fragments of the melody used, is employed in Hoe losteleck, a piece based on a song which may have had secular character. Pete quid vis, a piece of unknown origins and function, consists of a large variety of different treatments of a single theme, either treated imitatively itself, or accompanied by independently conceived imitative passages.

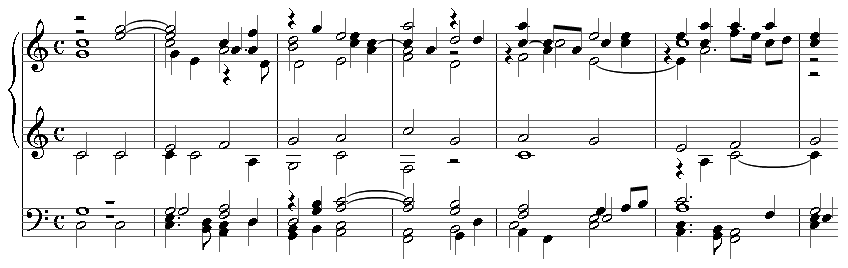
First bars of Schlick's 10-voice setting of Ascendo ad Patrem meum

Schlick's letter to Bernardo Clesio contains his only known late works: a set of eight settings of the sequence verse Gaude Dei genitrix (from the Christmas sequence Natus ante saecula) and a set of two settings of the Ascension antiphon Ascendo ad Patrem meum. Both sets have didactic purposes. Gaude Dei genitrix settings establish various ways of reinforcing a two-voice setting, in which the chant is accompanied by moderately ornamented counterpoint, by duplicating both lines in parallel thirds, fourths, or sixths. The pieces, which may have been intended for voices rather than the organ, range from three- to five-voice settings. Schlick himself noted the didactic aspect, writing that he "found and made a separate rule for each setting, which are so clear that it will be easy to set all chants in the same manner." His Ascendo ad Patrem meum settings serve a different purpose, but also are a miniature encyclopaedia: the first setting is in two voices (and so the most basic of all possible settings), whereas the second is in ten voices (and so the most advanced of all possible settings). The ten-voice work is unique in organ repertoire, both for the polyphonic scope and the pedal technique.

=== Lute settings ===
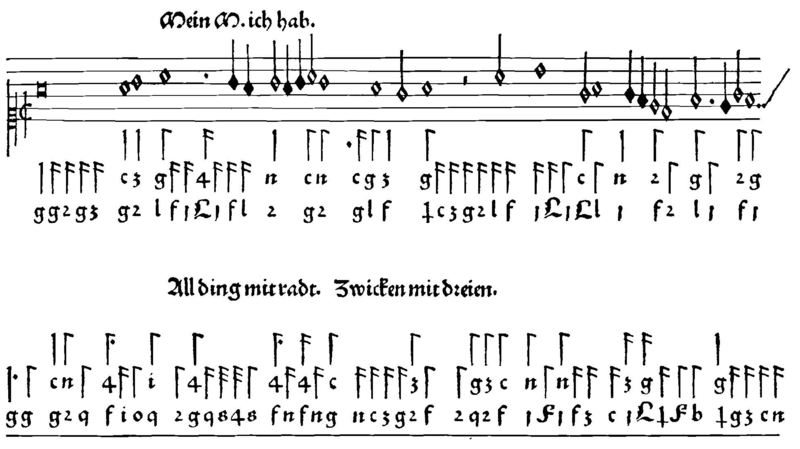
The two types of notation used for lute pieces in Tabulaturen

The Tabulaturen etlicher lobgesang is the earliest extensive source of German lute music and also one of the earliest published collections of lute music known. There are fifteen lute pieces, twelve of which are duets for voice and lute. The pieces are organized by difficulty, which reflects the didactic aspect of the Tabulaturen. Curiously, Schlick does not include performing instructions, which are commonplace in most later German publications, and furthermore, no texts are included, although most can be found in contemporary sources—there are just three songs unique to the Tabulaturen (Mein lieb ist weg, Philips zwolffpot and All Ding mit radt). Almost all the songs are settings of German polyphonic Lieder on secular texts. There are two exceptions. The first, Metzkin Isaack, may be of Netherlandish origin, and there is a possibility that Schlick learned the piece from Petrucci's Harmonice Musices Odhecaton. This would imply that Schlick borrowed the idea to apply for an imperial privilege for Spiegel and Tabulaturen from Petrucci. The second exception is All Ding mit radt, which is different from every other piece in the Tabulaturen: it relies not on the phrase structure of the song, like other settings, but rather on motivic and harmonic principles. Also, unlike other lute settings, it does not use bar form.

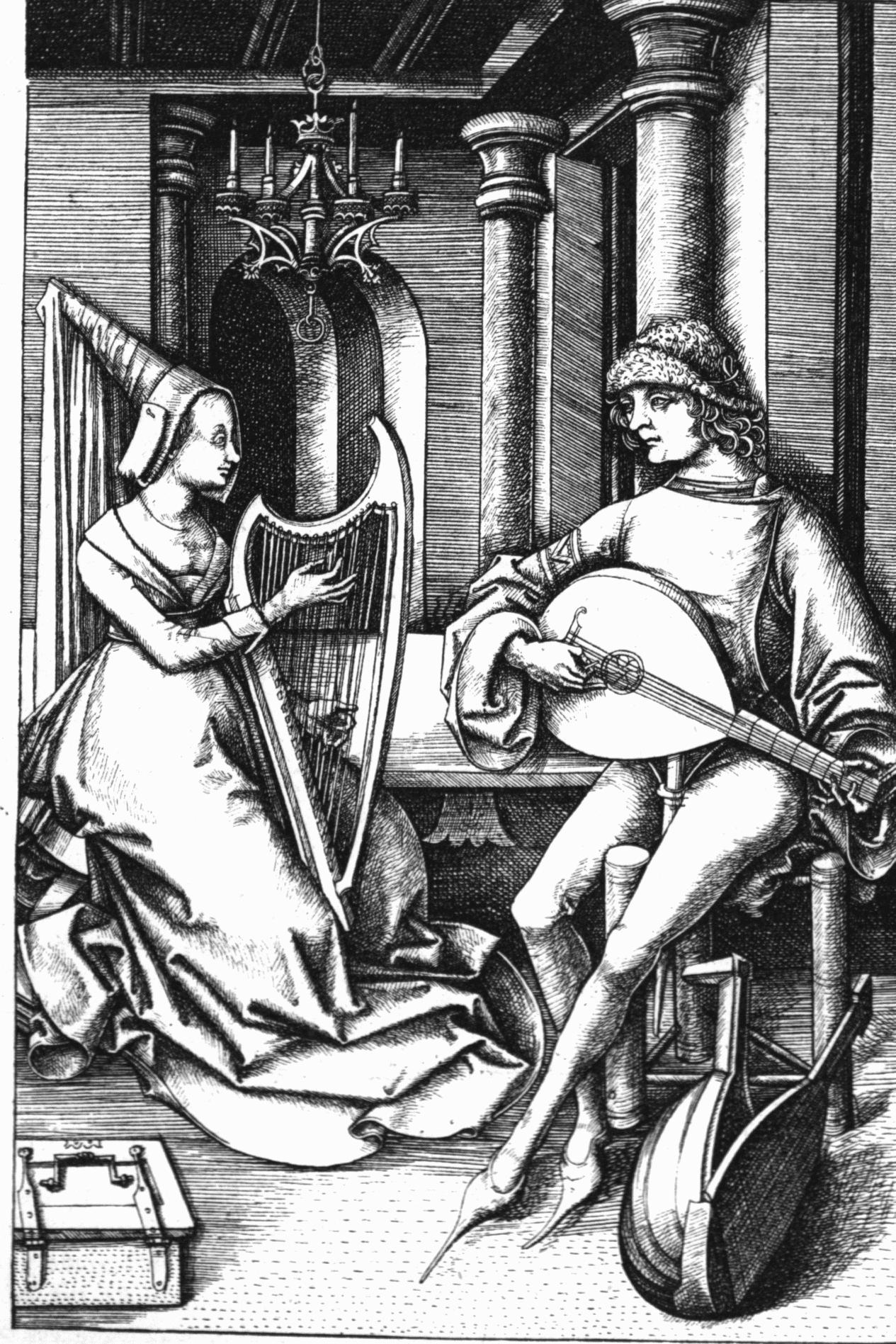
A 15th century print by Israhel van Meckenem. Schlick may as well have participated in such performances: he could play both lute and harp.

In most settings Schlick uses mixed notation: the upper part is notated mensurally, while the lower parts are given in tablature. The practice was rarely used in Germany at the time, but it appears in many contemporary French and Italian sources, such as collections of frottolas by Franciscus Bossinensis (1509–1511) or Marchetto Cara (c. 1520), and Pierre Attaingnant's publications (late 1520s). Another important deviation from the German norm is Schlick's tendency to put the cantus firmus in the highest part, the discantus, whereas the norm for German Lieder was cantus firmus in the tenor.

As is usual for lute intabulations, none of Schlick's settings are completely faithful to their models. The changes range from addition of modest ornaments, as in Nach lust or Vil hinderlist, to insertions of new material, as in Mein M. ich hab and Weg wart dein art. One particularly important change occurs in Schlick's intabulation of Hertzliebstels pild, in which Schlick attempts a type of word painting: the words "mit reichem Schall" ("with rich sound/splendor") are illustrated by an increase in rhythmic activity. The three solo lute settings are all in three voices, and present three distinct ways of three-voice intabulation. All Ding mit radt contains numerous passages in two voices, and so serves as an introduction to playing three-voice music. Wer gnad durch klaff is one of Schlick's most straightforward intabulations, using most of the original material unchanged. Finally, Weg wart dein art is a free intabulation, with numerous ornaments, figuration and other embellishments. The vast majority of Schlick's lute pieces are not exceptionally virtuosic, and are somewhat easier to perform than near-contemporary lute music by Hans Neusidler and Hans Judenkünig; however, the works in the Tabulaturen cannot be used as a basis to judge Schlick's technique, since the book had a didactic aspect, and Schlick planned a second volume with more complex and difficult music.

== Influence ==
Schlick was of the utmost importance in the early history of organ music in Germany. He was a much sought-after organ consultant, and while his blindness prevented him from doing much of the construction he was closely associated with organ-builders as an advisor; he tested new organs, performed widely, and was a strong influence among other composers at the time. His method of weaving contrapuntal lines around a cantus firmus, derived from a chorale tune, can be seen as foreshadowing the development of the chorale prelude in a later age. Schlick can be seen as the first figure in a long line of development which culminated in the music of J.S. Bach more than two hundred years later.

== List of works ==
=== Music ===
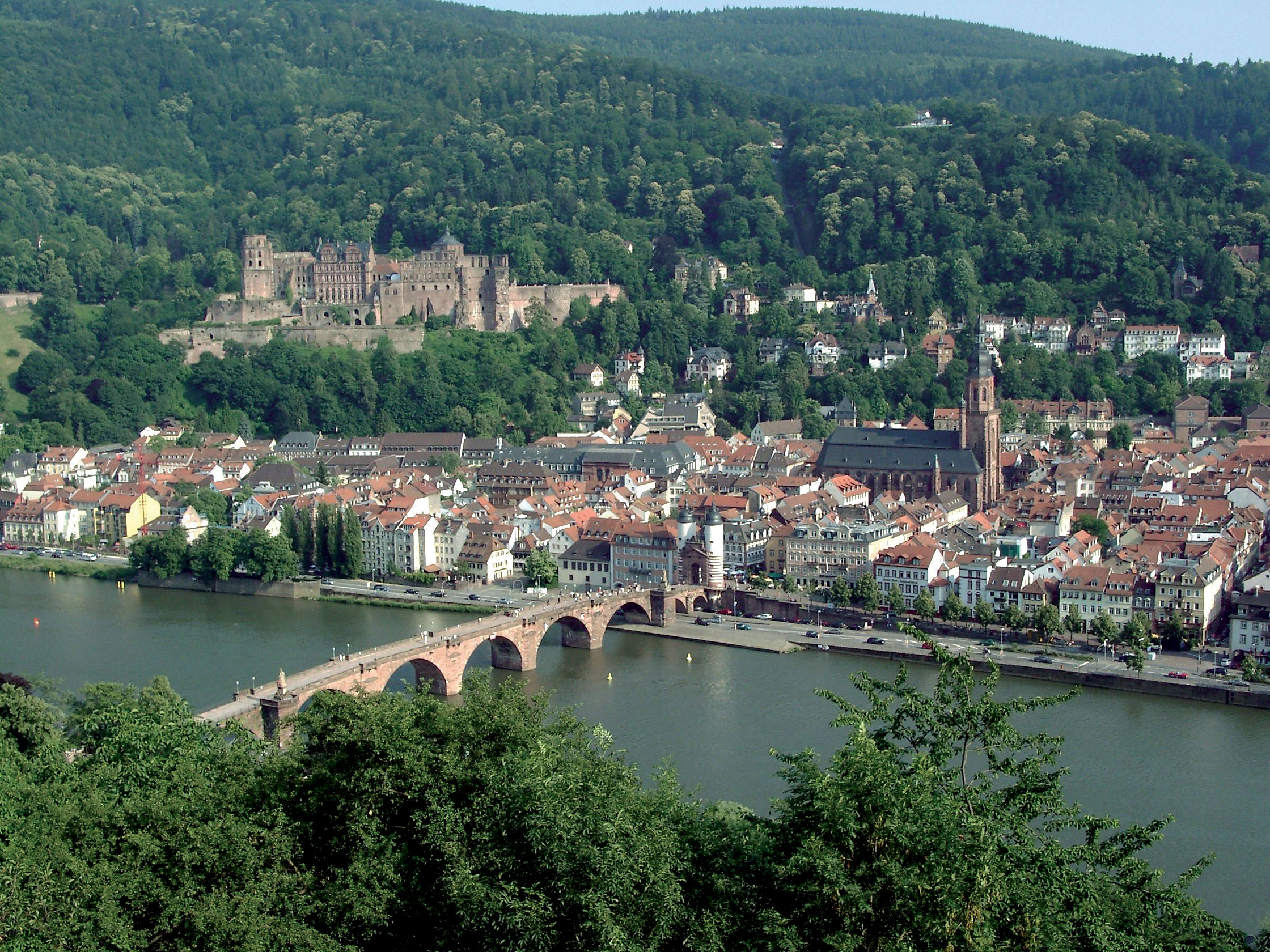
Heidelberg as it appears today. Very little remains from Schlick's time: the city was almost completely destroyed in the late 17th century, and parts of the castle were already ruined by the late 16th.

- Tabulaturen etlicher lobgesang und lidlein uff die orgeln un lauten ("Tablatures of Several Canticles and Songs for the Organ and Lute", Mainz, 1512):
  - Organ works: Salve Regina, Ad te clamamus, Eya ergo advocata, O pia, O dulcis Maria, Pete quid vis, Hoe losteleck, Benedictus, Primi toni, Maria zart, Christe, Da pacem (1), Da pacem (2), Da pacem (3).
  - Works for lute: Mein M. ich hab, Cupido hat, Hertzliebstes pild, Nach lust hab ich, Vil hinderlist, Möcht es gesein, Mein lieb ist weg, Ich schrei und rüeff, Metzkin Isaack, Philips zwölffpot, Nun hab ich all mein tag gehört, Maria zart, All Ding mit radt, Wer gnad durch klaff, Weg wart dein art.
- Letter to Bernardo Clesio (late 1520–early 1521):
  - Ascendo ad Patrem meum a 2, for organ
  - Ascendo ad Patrem meum a 10, for organ
  - Gaude Dei genitrix, 8 settings a 3–5, for organ
- 2 songs, 4vv
- Mi-mi, fragment, possibly from a lost mass setting (only soprano and bass parts survive from a 3- (or more) voice setting)

=== Writings ===
- Spiegel der Orgelmacher und Organisten ("Mirror of Organ Makers and Organ Players", Speyer, 1511)

== Notes, citations and references ==
=== Cited sources and other sources ===
- Apel, Willi. 1972. The History of Keyboard Music to 1700. Translated by Hans Tischler. Indiana University Press. ISBN 0-253-21141-7. Originally published as Geschichte der Orgel- und Klaviermusik bis 1700 by Bärenreiter-Verlag, Kassel.
- Keyl, Stephen Mark. 1989. Arnolt Schlick and Instrumental Music circa 1500. Diss. Duke University.
- Lenneberg, Hans. 1957. The Critic Criticized: Sebastian Virdung and his Controversy with Arnold Schlick, JAMS, x, pp. 1–6.
- Lindley, Mark. 1974. Early 16th-Century Keyboard Temperaments, MD 28, pp. 129–139.
- Marx, Hans Joachim. 1980. Arnolt Schlick, in The New Grove Dictionary of Music and Musicians, ed. Stanley Sadie. 20 vol. London, Macmillan Publishers Ltd. ISBN 1-56159-174-2
- Owen, Barbara. 1999. The Registration of Baroque Organ Music. Indiana University Press. ISBN 0-253-21085-2
- Owen, Barbara & Williams, Peter (2001). "Organ. V. 3: Arnolt Schlick's "Spiegel der Orgelmacher"". In Sadie, Stanley & Tyrrell, John (eds.). The New Grove Dictionary of Music and Musicians (2nd ed.). London: Macmillan Publishers. ISBN 978-1-56159-239-5.
- Lunelli, Renato. 1949. Contributi trentini alle relazioni musicali fra l'Italia e la Germania nel Rinascimento. Acta Musicologica, 21, pp. 41-70 (https://doi.org/10.2307/931534; https://www.jstor.org/stable/931534)
- Pietzsch, Gerhard. 1963. Quellen und Forschungen zur Geschichte der Musik am kurpfälzischen Hof zu Heidelberg bis 1622. Akademie der Wissenschaften und der Literatur, Abhandlungen der geistes- und sozialwissenschaftlichen Klasse, Jahrgang 1963, Nr. 6. Mainz: Verlag der Akademie der Wissenschaften und der Literatur in Mainz. (in German)
- Reese, Gustave. 1954. Music in the Renaissance. New York, W.W. Norton & Co. ISBN 0-393-09530-4
