= Fridolin Sicher =

Swiss composer and organist

Fridolin Sicher (March 6, 1490 – June 13, 1546) was a Swiss composer and organist of the Renaissance. He was born in Bischofszell and began his study of the organ at the age of 13 with Martin Vogelmaier, the organist of Konstanz Cathedral. He then studied theology and in 1510 became a prebend and organist at St Agnes Church in Bischofszell. He later returned to Konstanz for further study with Hans Buchner (a pupil of Paul Hofhaimer). Sicher went on to become the organist of the collegiate church of St Gallen (circa 1516) and of St Michael's Church in Ensisheim (circa 1531). He returned to Bischofszell in 1537, where he was made both organist and chaplain of St Agnes Church.

His St Gallen Organ Book (compiled between 1512 and 1521) contains 176 mainly pieces, predominantly of sacred music, by over 90 Renaissance composers. Of those pieces, 110 are transcriptions of vocal works including his own composition, Resonet in laudibus, as well as works by Busnoys, Josquin, Weerbeke, Agricola, Compère, Isaac, Brumel, La Rue, Mouton, Obrecht, Pipelare and others. In 1546 Sicher had surgery from which he never recovered. He died in the city of his birth at the age of 56.

== Sources ==
- Marx, Hans Joachim (2001). "Sicher, Fridolin". In Sadie, Stanley; Tyrrell, John (eds.). The New Grove Dictionary of Music and Musicians (2nd ed.). London: Macmillan Publishers. ISBN 978-1-56159-239-5.
- Clark, James Midgley, The Abbey of St. Gall as a Centre of Literature and Art, Cambridge University Press, 1926
