= Henry Bredemers =

- Born: 1472
- Origin: Netherland
- Died: May 20, 1522
- Occupation(s): Organist and Music teacher.

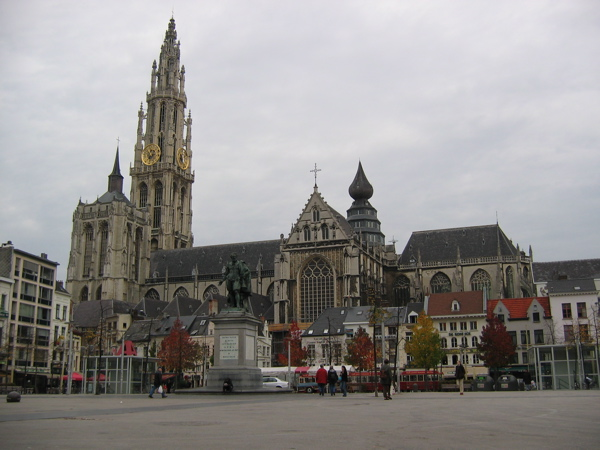
Antwerp's Cathedral of Our Lady, where Bredemers' career started

Henry (Henri, Hendrik) Bredemers (Bredeniers) (c. 1472 – May 20, 1522) was a South Netherlandish organist and music teacher. No compositions by him survive, and his historical importance lies chiefly in his activities as a teacher.

The first recorded reference to Bredemers is in a 1488 document which lists him as one of the singers of Cathedral of Our Lady (Onze-Lieve-Vrouwekathedraal), Antwerp. In 1491–1492 he served as organist of Saint James' Church (Sint-Jacobskerk) of the same city, and in 1493 he occupied a similar position at the Confraternity of Our Lady at Our Lady's church. Bredemers must have attained a considerable reputation in the following years: by 1501 he was distinguished enough to enter the chapel of Philip the Handsome as organist.

The chapel, known then as Grande chapelle, was the main musical establishment of the Burgundian-Habsburg court, and one of the most important court chapels of the Renaissance: it had a long and illustrious history associated with composers of the Burgundian School, particularly Guillaume Dufay. And at the time Bredemers joined it, members of the chapel included important composers such as Pierre de la Rue and Alexander Agricola. He was charged with performance duties as well as organisation of the chapel. Bredemers and other musicians of the chapel travelled with the court on multiple occasions: there were two voyages to Spain (in 1501–1503 and 1505–1506) and one to Heidelberg (in 1503). On the latter occasion Bredemers must have met Arnolt Schlick, court organist to the Electoral Palatinate.

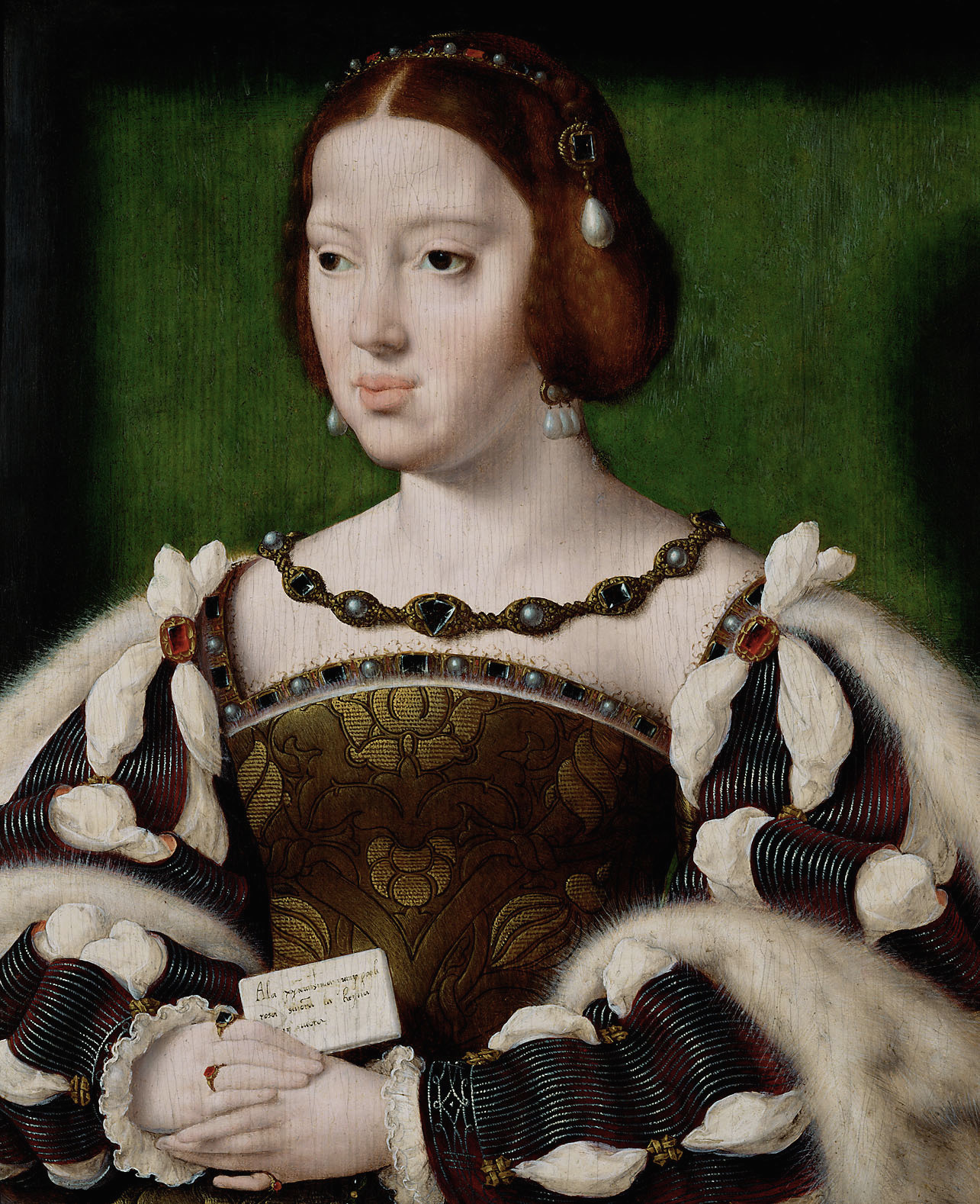
Eleanor of Austria, one of Bredemers' pupils, was reported to be a particularly talented and passionate performer on the clavichord

When Philip died in 1506 at Burgos, Spain, it was Bredemers who arranged for the transport of the chapel's liturgical and music books to Antwerp. Philip's eldest son, Charles, was too young to succeed his father, and so Margaret of Austria was appointed regent. At her court in Mechelen, Bredemers was chosen in 1507 as music teacher of Philip's children (Charles and his sisters Eleanor, Mary and Isabella) and organist of Charles' domestic chapel. He was also to instruct court entertainers and choirboys, as well as purchase and maintain instruments. Bredemers taught Charles and his sisters clavichord daily, as well as other instruments.

Bredemers' influence was spread far by Philip's children. Isabella's lessons came to an end in 1514 when she married Christian II of Denmark, and Eleanor left in 1518, after marrying Manuel I of Portugal (and after Manuel died, she married Francis I). Before leaving, both sisters asked Bredemers to buy them clavichords to take with them; Eleanor was known as a particularly fine performer. Bredemers retired to Lier in 1518, but continued assisting at Margaret's private chapel, and accompanied Charles during his visit to England in 1520–1521. He probably attended Charles' coronation in 1520. In May 1521 Bredemers was made provost at St Aubin's Cathedral, Namur. However, he resigned this position after only a year, in April 1522. He died the following month.

No compositions by Bredemers are known, although two were mentioned by Fétis in his Biographie universelle in the second half of the 19th century. Bredemers' importance lies in the influence he must have exerted over European keyboard music during his voyages to Spain, England and Germany, as well as through his pupils.
