= Verso (music) =

The verso is a genre in Iberian organ music, a local variant of the organ mass verset or alternatim.

The most prominent examples of the verso or verset in Spanish Baroque organ music are the Versos tertii toni of Antonio Cabezón, and Verso para orquesta of Ignacio de Jerusalem with lesser known examples such as Versos de quatro tono of Carmelite friar Pedro Carrera y Lanchares and Versos de Kyrie of Portuguese composer Manuel Rodrigues Coelho. The vocal lines were not always sung, and today usually not performed or recorded.

Modern compositions paying homage to the Baroque verso include Roberto Sierra (b.1953) 4 Versos for cello and orchestra.
