= Alternatim =

Alternatim refers to a technique of liturgical musical performance, especially in relationship to the Organ Mass, but also to the Hymns, Magnificat and Salve regina traditionally incorporated into the Vespers and other liturgies of the Catholic Church. A specific part of the ordinary of the Mass (such as the Kyrie and the Gloria) would be divided into versets. Each verset would be performed antiphonally by two groups of singers, giving rise to polyphonic settings of half of the text. One of these groups may alternatively have consisted of a soloist, a group of instruments, or organ. The missing even- or odd-numbered verses were supplied by plainchant or, perhaps more commonly (to judge by the organ masses of Hans Buchner), by improvisations on the organ. The verso became a particularly prevalent genre in Renaissance and Baroque organ music, both Italian and Iberian, and most of the French classical organ literature consists of alternatim versets.

A large amount of musical repertoire was specifically written for alternatim performance, with Heinrich Isaac and Charles Justin (1830–1873) as notable composers. Alternatim performance of the Mass was common throughout Europe in the seventeenth, eighteenth, and nineteenth centuries. A similar tradition of alternatim performance existed for example also for Magnificat compositions.

Documentation in England is rather slight. The organ involved seems to have been a man-portable instrument, of 1 or so speaking ranks. There is no evidence for the use, in alternatim, of the larger "standing" (on a loft or platform) organ of the English Cathedral.

In the Catholic Church, the practice was banned by Pope Pius X in his 1903 Motu proprio Tra le Sollecitudini. The practice did, however, inform the works of Olivier Messiaen, who wrote pseudo-versets for his many liturgical organ works, especially his Messe de la Pentecôte (1950).
