= Paul Allix =

French classical organist and composer

Paul Allix (17 November 1888 – 27 November 1960) was a French classical organist and composer.

== Biography ==
Born in Paris, Paul Allix studied music at the Institut National des Jeunes Aveugles being himself blind. He worked the organ and music composition with Adolphe Marty and the piano with Maurice Blazy (1873–1933). In 1909 he was appointed organist of the great organ of the Basilique Sainte-Trinité de Cherbourg where he invited several organists, including André Marchal in 1919. There he taught the piano. He died in Cherbourg-Octeville at the age of 72,

== Works ==
Paul Allix composed several pieces for piano, religious motets and some organ pieces:

- Cor Jesu: motet
- Sonate pascale (on the sequence Victimae paschali): sonata for organ.
- Esquisses, five little pieces for piano
- Enfantillages, six pieces for piano, annotated and fingered by Blanche Selva
- Pages anciennes, eight pieces for piano, annotated and fingered by Blanche Selva
- Berceuse et ronde, for piano
- Au soir, for piano
- Communion, piéce pour orgue, publiée 4eme volume "maitres contemporains de l'orgue" recueillies par l'abbé Jos.JOUBERT. (1909?)
- Andantino, piéce pour orgue, publiée 4eme volume "maitres contemporains de l'orgue" recueillies par l'abbé Jos.JOUBERT. (1909?)
