= Valence-d'Albigeois =

- Commune
- Coat of arms
- Location of Valence-d'Albigeois
- Location within France Location within Occitanie
- Coordinates: 44°01′15″N 2°24′18″E
- Country: France
- Region: Occitania
- Department: Tarn
- Arrondissement: Albi
- Canton: Carmaux-1 Le Ségala
- Intercommunality: Val 81

Government
  - Mayor (2020–2026): Christine Deymie
- Area^{1}: 20.47 km^{2} (7.90 sq mi)
- Elevation: 464 m (1,522 ft)
- Highest elevation: 520 m (1,710 ft)
- Lowest elevation: 302 m (991 ft)
- Population (2023): 1,277
  - Density: 62.38/km^{2} (161.6/sq mi)
- Time zone: UTC+01:00 (CET)
  - Summer (DST): UTC+02:00 (CEST)
- INSEE/Postal code: 81308 /81340
- ^{1} French Land Register data, which excludes lakes, ponds, glaciers > 1 km^{2} (0.386 sq mi or 247 acres) and river estuaries.

Valence-d'Albigeois (French pronunciation: [valɑ̃s dalbiʒwa]; Occitan: Valença) is a commune in the Tarn department in southern France.

== See also ==
- Communes of the Tarn department
