= Girolamo Cavazzoni =

Italian organist and composer

Girolamo (Hieronimo) Cavazzoni (c. 1525 – after 1577) was an Italian organist and composer, son of Marco Antonio Cavazzoni. Little is known about his life except that he worked at Venice and Mantua, and published two collections of organ music. These collections only contain music written before about 1549, but are of high quality, and established the traditional form of imitative ricercars and canzonas.

== Life ==
Practically nothing is known about Cavazzoni's life. The approximate year of his birth can be surmised from his remarks in the preface to Intavolatura libro primo, the first collection of his music to be published. The volume was printed in Venice in 1543, and Cavazzoni informs the reader in the preface that he is "not much more than a boy" (anchor quasi fanciullo), which indicates Cavazzoni was around 17 at the time. Cavazzoni's reputation must have been considerably high already at that time, since he was able to secure a privilege from the Venetian council to publish this collection. The second collection of Cavazzoni's music, Intabulatura d'organo, carries no publication date (it appeared somewhere between 1543 and 1549) and contains no biographical details.

By 1552 Cavazzoni may have been working in Urbino, and from 1565 to 1566 he supervised the building of the organ in the court church of S Barbara in Mantua. The composer was apparently on good terms with Guglielmo X Gonzaga, Duke of Mantua, and worked as organist at S Barbara. The last known mention of Cavazzoni is from 1577, naming him as organist of that church.

== Works ==
Cavazzoni's surviving oeuvre comprises two collections published during his lifetime, and two ensemble ricercares. All of this music dates from before 1552, thus Cavazzoni's late work is completely unknown. Cavazzoni's published collections mostly contain liturgical music: hymns, alternatim masses, and alternatim Magnificat settings. Cavazzoni's writing in these works is distinguished by the freedom with which he treats chant melodies: unlike most of his predecessors and contemporaries, who sought to present the chant clearly and without serious changes, Cavazzoni derives multiple themes from a single chant by stretching or omitting notes, changing the rhythmic design, etc. Cavazzoni would also employ innovative structures in his works. For example, in Magnificat settings he treats portions of the chant imitatively, and since each verse is different and presenting a decorated form of the melody, Cavazzoni's settings are effectively miniature variation sets. In hymn settings, Cavazzoni sometimes employs fore-imitation: anticipatory imitative sections before the actual chant is set, and/or between verses.

The most historically important works by Cavazzoni are his ricercars and canzonas, from which the history of imitative ricercars and canzonas starts, as far as is known. The four ricercares of Intavolatura libro primo are multi-sectional works consisting essentially of series of imitative expositions of different subjects. The two surviving ensemble ricercares by Cavazzoni do not share these characteristics: there are no sections, no clearly defined cadential points, and the works are quite short compared to their keyboard counterparts. Cavazzoni's two canzonas, also contained in Intavolatura libro primo, are similar in design. They employ short, lively subjects derived from those in works by other composers.

== List of works ==
- Intavolatura cioe recercari, canzoni, himni, magnificat [...] libro primo (Venice, 1543)
  - Ricercar I
  - Ricercar II
  - Ricercar III
  - Ricercar IV
  - Canzon sopra Il est bel et bon
  - Canzon sopra Faultre d'argent
  - Christe redemptor omnium
  - Ad coenam agni providi
  - Lucis creator optime
  - Ave maris stella
  - Magnificat primi toni
  - Magnificat octavi toni
- Intavolatura d'organo, cioe misse, himni, magnificat [...] libro secondo (Venice c.1543–1549)
  - Missa Apostolorum
  - Missa Dominicalis
  - Missa de Beata Virgine
  - Veni creator Spiritus
  - Pange lingua gloriosi
  - Exsultet coelum laudibus
  - Iste confessor
  - Jesu nostra redemptio
  - Jesu corona virginum
  - Deus tuorum militum
  - Hostis Herodis impie
  - Magnificat quarti toni
  - Magnificat sexti toni
- 2 ensemble ricercares à 4 (1540) and à 3 (1551)

== Editions ==
- Girolamo Cavazzoni: Orgelwerke, Oscar Mischiati (Mainz: Schott, 1959–1961)
