= Intabulation =

Intabulation, from the Italian word intavolatura, refers to an arrangement of a vocal or ensemble piece for keyboard, lute, or other plucked string instrument, written in tablature.

== History ==
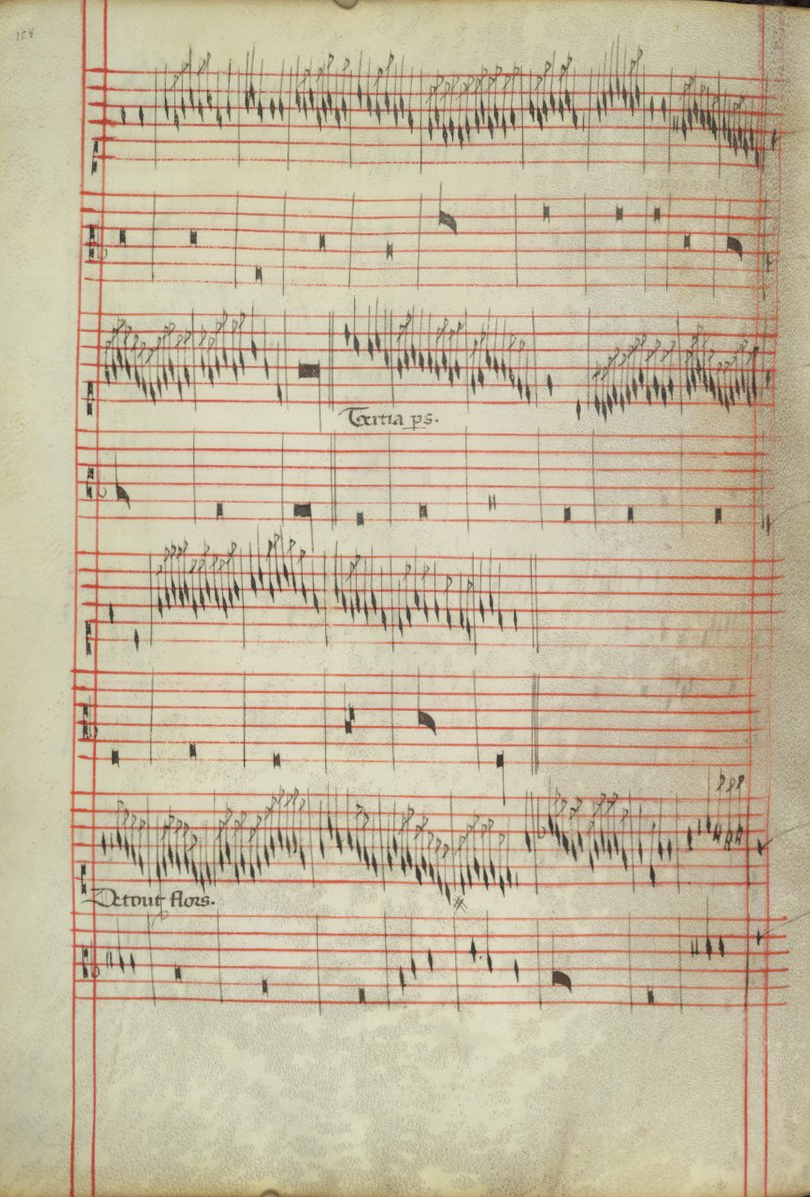
Guillaume de Machault De tout flors (intabulation in the Faenza Codex)

Intabulation was a common practice in 14th–16th century keyboard and lute music. A direct effect of intabulation was one of the early advantages of keyboards, the ability to render multiple instruments' music on one instrument. The earliest intabulation is from the mid-14th century Robertsbridge Codex, also one of the first sources of keyboard music still in existence. Some other early sources of intabulated music are the Faenza Codex and the Reina manuscripts (from the 14th century) and the Buxheim manuscript (from the 15th century). The Faenza manuscript, the largest of these early manuscripts, written circa 1400, contains pieces written or transcribed in the 14th century, such as those by Francesco Landini and Guillaume de Machaut. More than half of its pieces are intabulations. The large Buxheim manuscript is dominated by intabulations, mainly of prominent composers of the time, including John Dunstaple, Gilles Binchois, Walter Frye, and Guillaume Dufay. The term "intabulation" continued to be popular through the 16th century, but fell out of use in the early 17th century, though the practice continued. The exception is the 16th- and 17th-century Italian keyboard pieces which included both vocal and instrumental music. Intabulations contain all the vocal lines of a polyphonic piece, for the most part, although they are sometimes combined or redistributed in order to work better on the instrument the intabulation is intended for, and idiomatic ornaments are sometimes added.

Intabulations are an important source of information for historically informed performance because they show ornaments as they would have been played on various instruments, and they are a huge clue as to the actual performance of musica ficta, since tablature shows where a musician places their fingers, which is less up to interpretation than certain staff notations.
