= Giacomo Fogliano =

Italian composer

Giacomo Fogliano (da Modena; also Jacopo, Fogliani; 1468 – 10 April 1548) was an Italian composer, organist, harpsichordist, and music teacher of the Renaissance, active mainly in Modena in northern Italy. He was a composer of frottole, the popular vocal form ancestral to the madrigal, and later in his career he also wrote madrigals themselves. He also wrote some sacred music and a few instrumental compositions.

== Life ==
Façade of Modena Cathedral. Fogliano was organist here from 1479 to 1497.

Giacomo Fogliano was the older brother of Lodovico Fogliano (c. 1475 – 1542). Lodovico, also a composer, was better known as a theorist. Giacomo was born in Modena, where he evidently spent most of his career. Details of his life are sketchy, but most of his years of employment and at least one of his journeys are known. Early in his life he was praised for his mastery of various instruments, particularly the organ and the harpsichord, and in 1479 he became organist at Modena Cathedral – an unusual achievement for a musician of 11. The records of the cathedral list him as maestro di cappella (singing master) also starting in that year, ending in 1497, at which time he vanished from the record, reappearing again in 1504, from which year he held the dual post of organist and maestro di cappella until his death in 1548. For the period between 1497 and 1504 he may have been in Siena; a reference to a similarly named individual in the records of Siena city archives from 1498 has been tentatively identified as the Fogliano. His first published composition, a frottola in one of Ottaviano Petrucci's earliest prints, dates from 1502 (Venice). Among his duties at Modena was teaching, and from 1512 to 1514 he instructed Giulio Segni on organ and harpsichord. Late in his career, in 1543, he went to Parma to investigate the organ they had installed there. The cathedral in Modena contains a plaque in his honor.

Modena at this time was part of the domain of the House of Este, at that time centered in Ferrara. While the town was not a major center of music-making, as it lacked a local aristocratic court, it still had a substantial cathedral which kept an up-to-date repertory of polyphonic music. Fogliano was maestro di cappella at this institution during the period of its collection, and also during the time when Cardinal Giovanni Morone, one of the principal reformers of the Council of Trent, began the process of simplification of polyphony in order to make the text understandable to listeners. Most of Fogliano's sacred music predates this time.

== Music and influence ==
Of his music, three motets, two laude, 13 frottolas (one of which is attributed in one source to Bartolomeo Tromboncino), 29 madrigals, and four keyboard ricercars have survived. That one of the frottolas was published by Petrucci only one year after the invention of music printing shows the esteem in which it was held, at least by that Venetian printer; Alfred Einstein, writing in The Italian Madrigal, describes the same piece (Segue cuor e non restare) as "remarkably awkward". Two of the other frottolas published by Petrucci as anonymous have since been attributed to Fogliano.

Most of his frottolas were probably composed around 1500, which was around the peak time of production of that popular musical form. Like other frottolas, his were for four voices, using a simple homophonic texture, with the melody in the topmost voice. The two inner voices were usually filler and lacking in melodic interest, while the highest and lowest voices frequently moved in parallel tenths.

Fogliano began to write madrigals sometime in the mid-1530s, although dates of the individual works cannot be determined precisely. He published his one collection of madrigals, for five voices, in 1547. Stylistically many of these madrigals are like the frottolas he had written forty years before; a few others use a polyphonic style akin to the motet. While most of his madrigals are for five voices, most published in his one book, he wrote several for three voices. At least one of his madrigals appears in a Roman print by Andrea Antico dated 1537, an anthology of madrigals for three voices which includes works by Jacques Arcadelt and Costanzo Festa. One or two of the madrigals without attribution in the same collection may be by Fogliano as well.

Fogliano evidently wrote his motets and laude in the early 16th century, probably intending them to be performed by the singers at the cathedral. They are relatively simple and uncluttered in texture compared to similar works of the time from other musical centers, and are singable by amateurs or lightly trained musicians. As the singers in the provincial establishment at Modena were unlikely to have attained the levels of virtuosity found in places such as Ferrara and Venice, these pieces were well suited for this choir.

The keyboard ricercares, composed in the 1520s or 1530s and among the earliest examples of the form, are contrapuntal, in the manner of contemporary vocal music, but with shorter points of imitation. They include occasional ostinatos and scalewise flourishes, foreshadowing developments later in the century. Four of these pieces have survived, and were published in the 1940s in I classici musicali italiani (Milan).
