= Giulio Segni =

Italian composer

Giulio Segni da Modena, also Julio Segni and Biondin (Modena, 1498- Rome, 1561) was an Italian composer known for his ricercars in Musica Nova (Venice 1540). He was a pupil of Giacomo Fogliano and became second organist at St Mark's Basilica, San Marco, Venice, in 1530.
