= Lazare-Auguste Maquaire =

French organist and composer (1872–1906)

Lazare-Auguste Maquaire (25 October 1872 – 16 August 1906) was a French organist and composer. A student of Charles-Marie Widor, he is known for a few works for the organ, most notably his First Organ Symphony in E-flat major, Op.20, his only published work.

== Life ==
Maquaire was born in Lyon on 25 October 1872 to a family of embroiderers.

At Paris Conservatory he studied under Charles-Marie Widor, and subsequently became his assistant at Saint-Sulpice. In 1905, he composed his most well-known work, Première Symphonie pour Orgue, Op. 20, better known as the First Organ Symphony in English. He dedicated the work to his teacher.

His other works include the Fugue in G minor, composed in 1901, which was neither published nor given an Opus number. Its manuscript is currently stored at the Bibliothèque nationale.

Shortly after writing his First Organ Symphony, Maquaire died in 1906.
