= Marco Antonio Cavazzoni =

Italian composer

- Born: c. 1490
- Died: c. 1560
- Era: Renaissance
- Known for: Earliest known ricercars
- Notable work: Recerchari, motetti, canzoni [...] libro primo (1523)
- Children: Girolamo Cavazzoni

Marco Antonio Cavazzoni (c. 1490 – c. 1560) was an Italian organist and composer. He was the father of composer Girolamo Cavazzoni.

All of his extant music is contained in the print Recerchari, motetti, canzoni [...] libro primo, which was published in Venice in 1523. Included are the earliest known ricercars—they are not yet imitative, and are essentially written down improvisations, but there is a considerable amount of thematic development. The rest of the works in the collection are either arrangements of vocal pieces by Cavazzoni or other composers. Their style is firmly rooted in the Renaissance vocal chanson tradition.

== Published works ==
- 2 Ricercari
- 2 Mottetti: Salve Virgo, o Stella maris
- 4 Canzoni: Perdone moi sie folie, Madame vous aves mon coeur, Plus ne regres, Lautre yor per un matin.

A single piece for keyboard Recercada de maca in bologna, now kept in the parochial archives of Castell’Arquato (Piacenza) in Emilia-Romagna (ms. Musicale n. 2, cc. 5v-6v).
