= Codex Faenza =

15th-century musical manuscript

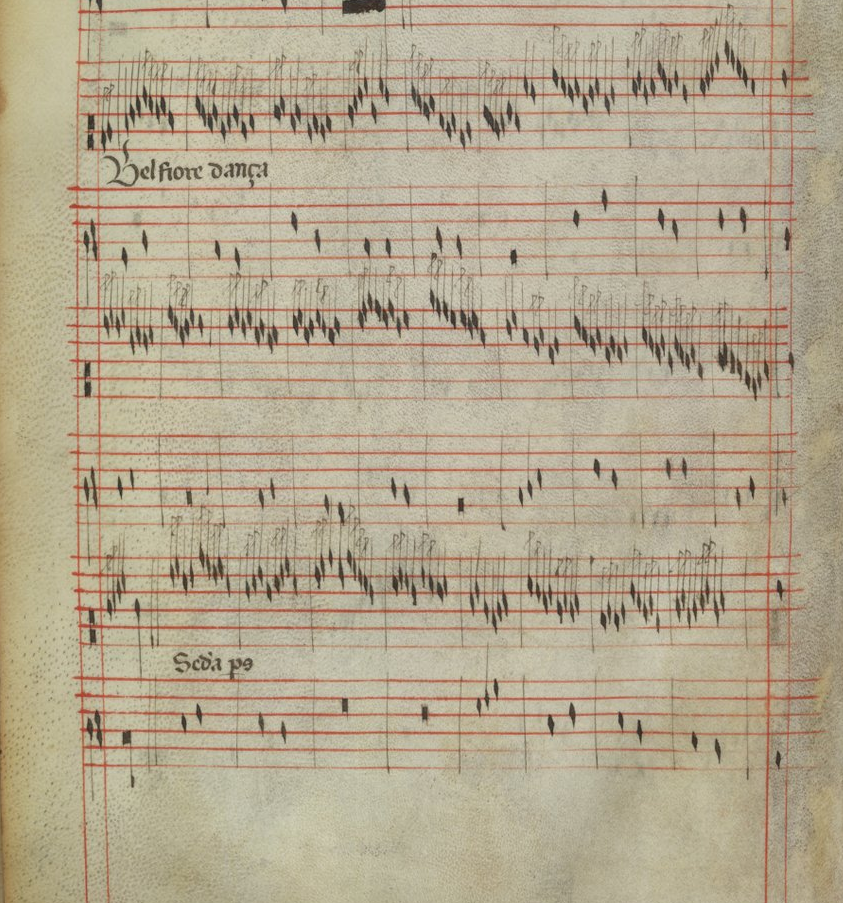

Bel fiore dança
Bel fiore dança (keyboard)

The Codex Faenza (Faenza, Biblioteca Comunale 117) abbreviated as "(I-FZc 117)", and sometimes known as Codex Bonadies, is a 15th-century musical manuscript containing the oldest large collection of keyboard music along with additional vocal pieces and music theoretical works by John Hothby. The Codex Faenza fully appeared in modern notation on Keyboard Music of the Late Middle Ages in Codex Faenza 117 (Corpus Mensurabilis Musicae, Band 57) by Dragan Plamenac, American Inst. of Musicology (1972). The manuscript is held at the Biblioteca Comunale di Faenza, near Ravenna. A facsimile of the complete manuscript with commentary by Pedro Memelsdorff was published by LIM in 2013.

The works of the manuscript are detailed below. The codes in the "Recordings" column are specified in the "Discography" section. The works added by Johannes Bonadies are specified with different color in the list.

| Nº | Folio | Work | Voices | Composer | Musical form | Concordances | Recordings | Comments |
|---|---|---|---|---|---|---|---|---|
| 1 | 2-3 | Kyrie | 2 | | intabulation | | CLE, PUN |
| 2 | 3v-5 | Gloria | 2 | | intabulation |
| 3 | 5v-6 | Kyrie | 3 | John Hothbi | Kyrie |
| 4 | 6v-7 | Et exultavit spiritus meus | 4 | Bernhard Ycart | Magníficat |
| 5 | 7v-8 | Et exultavit spiritus meus | 4 | Bernhard Ycart | Magníficat |
| 6 | 8v-9 | Kyrie | 4 | Bernhard Ycart | Kyrie |
| 7 | 9v-11 | Et in terra pax hominibus | 4 | Bernhard Ycart | Gloria |
| 8 | 11v | Fuga trium temporum | 3 | anonymous | fuga | | | Fuga without text |
| 9 | 20v-21 | Cantus grecus Christus surrexit | 4 | anonymous |
| 10 | 27v-28 | Ora pronobis | 3 | John Hothbi | motet |
| 11 | 28v-29 | Ave regina | 3 | Johannes de Erfordia | motet |
| 12 | 29v-30 | Kyrie | 3 | Johannes de Erfordia | Kyrie |
| 13 | 30v-31 | Sanctus | 3 | Johannes de Erfordia | Sanctus |
| 14 | 36-36v | Indescort | 2 | | intabulation | | FON, FRA | Diminution based on the anonymous ballade A discort sont Desir et Esperance |
| 15 | 37-37v | Hont paur | 2 | | intabulation | | STU, ORG, TRE, UNI, FAE, FRA, EGB, CAM | Based on a vocal work by Guillaume de Machaut |
| 16 | 37v-38v | De tout flors | 2 | | intabulation | | SCB, MHS, EML, LIB, ORG, TRE, FAE, ALT, DIS, ECG | Based on a vocal work by Guillaume de Machaut |
| 17 | 38v-39 | Aspire refus | 2 | | intabulation | EST | UNI |
| 18 | 39-40 | Elas mon cuer | 2 | | intabulation | | ORG, UNI, POL |
| 19 | 40-40v | De ce fol penser | 2 | | intabulation | | TFL, HAU, PAG | Based on a vocal work by P. des Molins |
| 20 | 40v-41v | J'ay grant espoir | 2 | | intabulation | | ORG, UNI |
| 21 | 41v-42 | Constantia | 2 | | intabulation | | FON, ORG, DUF, ECG, FER, GVO |
| 22 | 42-43 | Le ior | 2 | | intabulation | | ORG, UNI, POL, GOT, GVP |
| 23 | 43-43v | Iorlevie (Jour e jour la vie) | 2 | | intabulation | | FRO |
| 24 | 43v-44v | Viver ne puis | 2 | | intabulation |
| 25 | 44v-46v | Elas mon cuor | 2 | | intabulation | | | See #18 above. |
| 26 | 46v-48 | Deduto sey a quel che may | 2 | | intabulation | | ORG | Based on a vocal work by Antonio "Zachara" da Teramo |
| 27 | 48v-49 | Or sus, vous dormés trop | 2 | | intabulation | | AFR, MAR, NBC, ALB |
| 28 | 49v | (untexted) | 2 | | intabulation | | DUF, ECG, CPA |
| 29 | 50 | J'aime la biauté | 2 | | intabulation |
| 30 | 50-50v | Iorlevie (Jour meur la vie) | 2 | | intabulation | | | = obra No 23 |
| 31 | 50v-52 | Roseta che non canci mai colore | 2 | | intabulation | | | Based on a vocal work by Antonio 'Zachara' de Teramo |
| 32 | 52v-54 | Tupes | 2 | | intabulation |
| 33 | 54 | Sangilio | 2 | | intabulation | | VOI, CLE, AMC |
| 34 | 54-56 | (untexted) | 2 | | intabulation |
| 35 | 56v-57 | Biance flour | 2 | | intabulation | | RES, MUN, UNI |
| 36 | 57-58 | Benedicamus Domino | 2 | | intabulation | | DUF, VOI, SIX, PUN |
| 37 | 59v-60 | Kyrie | 2 | Johannes Bonadies | Kyrie |
| 38 | 63 | Que est ista | 4 | John Hothbi | motete |
| 39 | 63v-65 | Et exultavit spiritus meus | 3 | John Hothbi | Magnificat |
| 40 | 65v-66 | Et exultavit spiritus meus | 3 | Bernhard Ycart | Magnificat |
| 41 | 66v-67v | Et exultavit spiritus meus | 3 | John Hothbi | Magnificat |
| 42 | 68-69v | Soto l'imperio del posente prinçe | 2 | | intabulation | | | Based on a madrigal by Jacopo da Bologna |
| 43 | 69v-70v | Qualle leçe move | 2 | | intabulation | | | Based on a vocal work by Bartolino da Padova |
| 44 | 71-72 | La dolçce sere | 2 | | intabulation | | NBC, LON, TET | Based on a vocal work by Bartolino da Padova |
| 45 | 72-73 | O ciecho mondo | 2 | | intabulation | | DUF, TRE, HUE | Based on a vocal work by Jacopo da Bologna |
| 46 | 73-74v | Aquila altera | 2 | | intabulation | | PAN, LIB, ORG, REV, TRE, UNI, TFO, BER, CLA, RAY | Based on a vocal work by Jacopo da Bologna |
| 47 | 74v-77 | Inperial sedendo | 2 | | intabulation | | RSU | Based on a vocal work by Bartolino da Padova |
| 48 | 77-78 | Io me son uno che per le frasche | 2 | | intabulation | | PAN, ORG, TRE, RIE | Based on a vocal work by Jacopo da Bologna |
| 49 | 78-79 | Non na el so amante | 2 | | intabulation | | RIC, PAN, GVO, TRE, PUN | Based on a vocal work by Jacopo da Bologna on a text by Petrarch |
| 50 | 79-79v | Kyrie | 2 | | intabulation | | SYN, DUF, MAR, PUN |
| 51 | 79v-80v | Che pena questa | 2 | | intabulation | | ORG, ECG, FAE | Based on a vocal work by Francesco Landini |
| 52 | 80v-81 | Bel fiore dança | 2 | | intabulation | | DUF, UNI, ECG, LAM, NBE, MAR, BAM, WIT, PER, RIE, EMA, CIN, SIG, AFA, AMC, DEA |
| 53 | 81-81v | Non arà may pietà questa mia dona | 2 | | intabulation | | RES, BIN, UNI, ECG | Based on a vocal work by Francesco Landini |
| 54 | 82-82v | Un fior gentil | 2 | | intabulation | | TRE | Based on a vocal work by Antonius 'Zachara' de Teramo |
| 55 | 82v-83v | Rosetta che non canbi may colore | 2 | | intabulation | BOL, LUC, PAR | TRE | Based on a vocal work by Antonius 'Zachara' de Teramo |
| -- | 82v-83v | Roseta che non canci mai | 2 | | intabulation | | | Based on a vocal work by Antonius 'Zacharias' de Teramo |
| 56 | 84 | Diva panthera | 3 | John Hothbi | motete |
| 57 | 84v-85 | Tard' il mio cor | 3 | John Hothbi | | | | Secular work in Italian |
| 58 | 85v | Ave sublime triumphale | 3 | John Hothbi | motete |
| 59 | 86-86v | Amor | 3 | John Hothbi | | | | Secular work in Italian |
| 60 | 87 | Non so se'l e la mia culpa | 3 | Johannes de Erfordia | | | | Secular work in Italian |
| 61 | 87v | Doloroso mi tapinello io son | 3 | Johannes de Erfordia | | | | Secular work in Italian |
| 62 | 88-90 | Kyrie | 2 | | intabulation | | DGO, PUN |
| 63 | 90-92v | Gloria | 2 | | intabulation | | SIX, PUN |
| 64 | 93-94 | (untexted) | 2 | | intabulation | | DUF, PUN | [Deus in adjutorium meum intende] |
| 65 | 94v | (untexted) | 2 | | intabulation | | ECG, PUN |
| 66 | 95 | (untexted) | 2 | | intabulation | | DUF |
| 67 | 95-95v | (untexted) | 2 | | intabulation |
| 68 | 96-96v | (untexted) | 2 | | intabulation |
| 69 | 96v-97 | Ave maris stella | 2 | | intabulation | | DUF, VOI, SIX, TFO, EST, RVD, LEI, HUE, PUN, FOR |
| 70 | 97-97v | Benedicamus Domino | 2 | | intabulation | HUE |
