= Hans Buchner =

German organist and composer (1483-1538)

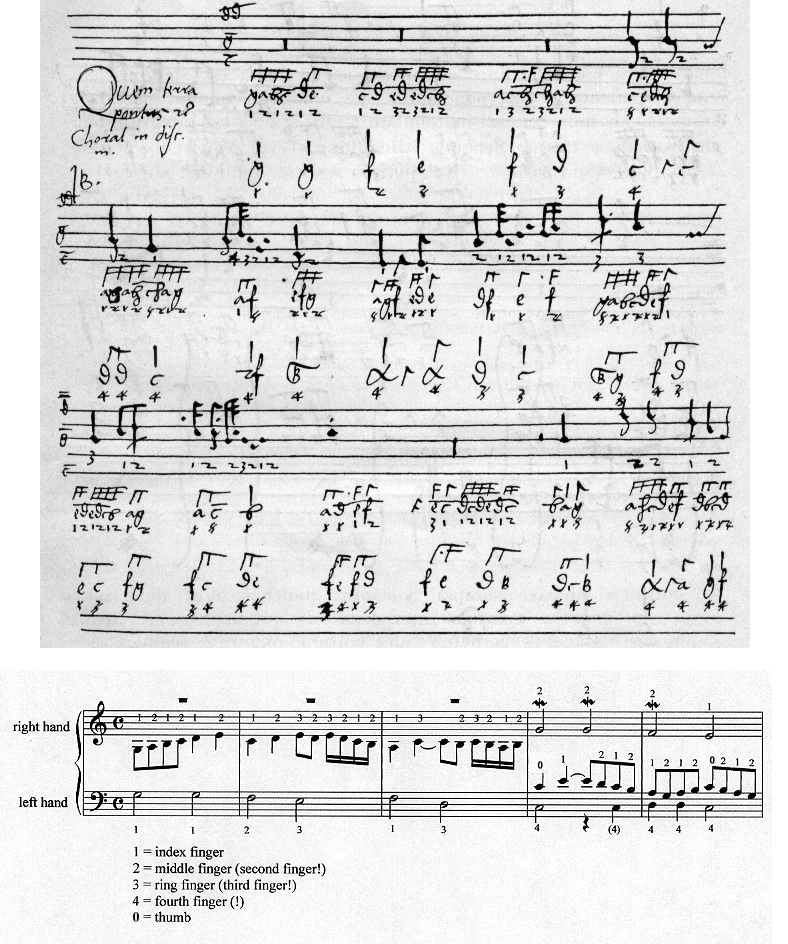
Fingered setting of Quem terra, pontus, the pre-tridentine office hymn for the Assumption (A second setting by Buchner is also found in the ms. Basel FI 8a)

Hans Buchner (also Joannes Buchner, Hans von Constanz; 26 October 1483 – March 1538) was a German organist and composer.

== Biography ==
Buchner was born on 26 October 1483 in Ravensburg. He was a student of Paul Hofhaimer, and may have worked for the emperor Maximilian I while Hofhaimer was away. From 1506 he worked in Konstanz as the cathedral organist. His relationship with Heinrich Isaac is unclear, but three of the odd-numbered sequence verses he set are in the same transpositions as the Choralis Constantinus (he also set Victimae paschali laudes, whereas Isaac used a different Easter sequence, Laudes salvatori). When, in the course of the Reformation, the bishop was forced to move his seat to Meersburg, Buchner followed him to continue in his post, while maintaining a residence in Konstanz. In 1529 he applied for a position at Speyer, but apparently demanded too high a salary. He was often called to inspect new organs, such as those of Zürich and Heidelberg. He died in March 1538, probably in Konstanz.

His most important legacy is the Fundamentbuch, a collection of organ music that also includes an introduction to the techniques of playing and improvising on plainchant. Buchner's Collected Organ Works (Sämtliche Orgelwerke) are edited by Jost Harro Schmidt as volumes 54 & 55 of Das Erbe deutscher Musik (Litolff/Frankfurt, 1974) Amongst his pupils was the Swiss organist and composer, Fridolin Sicher.
