= Pedro Carrera y Lanchares =

Spanish Carmelite friar, organist and composer

Fray Pedro Carrera y Lanchares (1760s - c.1815) was a Spanish Carmelite friar, organist and composer. Carrera was pupil of D. Joseph Lidon, organist of the Capilla Real de Madrid, then organist of the Monasterio de las Descalzas Reales (Madrid).
