= André Marchal =

French organist and organ teacher

- Birth name: André Louis Marchal
- Born: 6 February 1894; Paris, France
- Died: 27 August 1980 (aged 86); Saint-Jean-de-Luz, France
- Occupation(s): Organist, organ teacher
- Instrument: Pipe organ

André Louis Marchal (6 February 1894 – 27 August 1980) was a French organist and organ teacher. He was one of the great initiators of the twentieth-century organ revival in France and one of the cofounders of the Association des amis de l'orgue alongside Norbert Dufourcq.

== Biography ==
Marchal was born blind in Paris. Undaunted by this handicap, he studied the organ under Eugène Gigout at the Paris Conservatoire and there, in 1913, won First Prize in organ-playing. Four years later he also won the prix d'excellence for fugue and counterpoint.

Marchal concertized widely, both in France and abroad. He played a series of recitals at the Cleveland Museum of Art in late 1947 and early 1948. Marchal taught organ at the Institut National des Jeunes Aveugles in Paris, in addition to serving as titular organist of the Abbey of Saint-Germain-des-Prés (1915–1945) and Saint-Eustache (1945–1963). He resigned from Saint-Eustache in 1963, his departure being brought about over a conflict concerning the correct organ builder to be hired to restore Saint-Eustache's instrument.

He was an unparalleled improviser and was recognized as such by Fauré. Among his students were many distinguished musicians such as Jean Langlais, Peter Hurford, Louis Thiry and Jean-Pierre Leguay, one of three titulaires du grand orgue of Notre-Dame de Paris.

He died in 1980 in Saint-Jean-de-Luz at the age of 86.

== Awards and recognition ==
- Officer of the Légion d’honneur (1960)
- Officer of the Ordre des Arts et des Lettres (1965)
- National Patron of Delta Omicron
