= Paul Hofhaimer =

Austrian organist and composer (1459–1537)

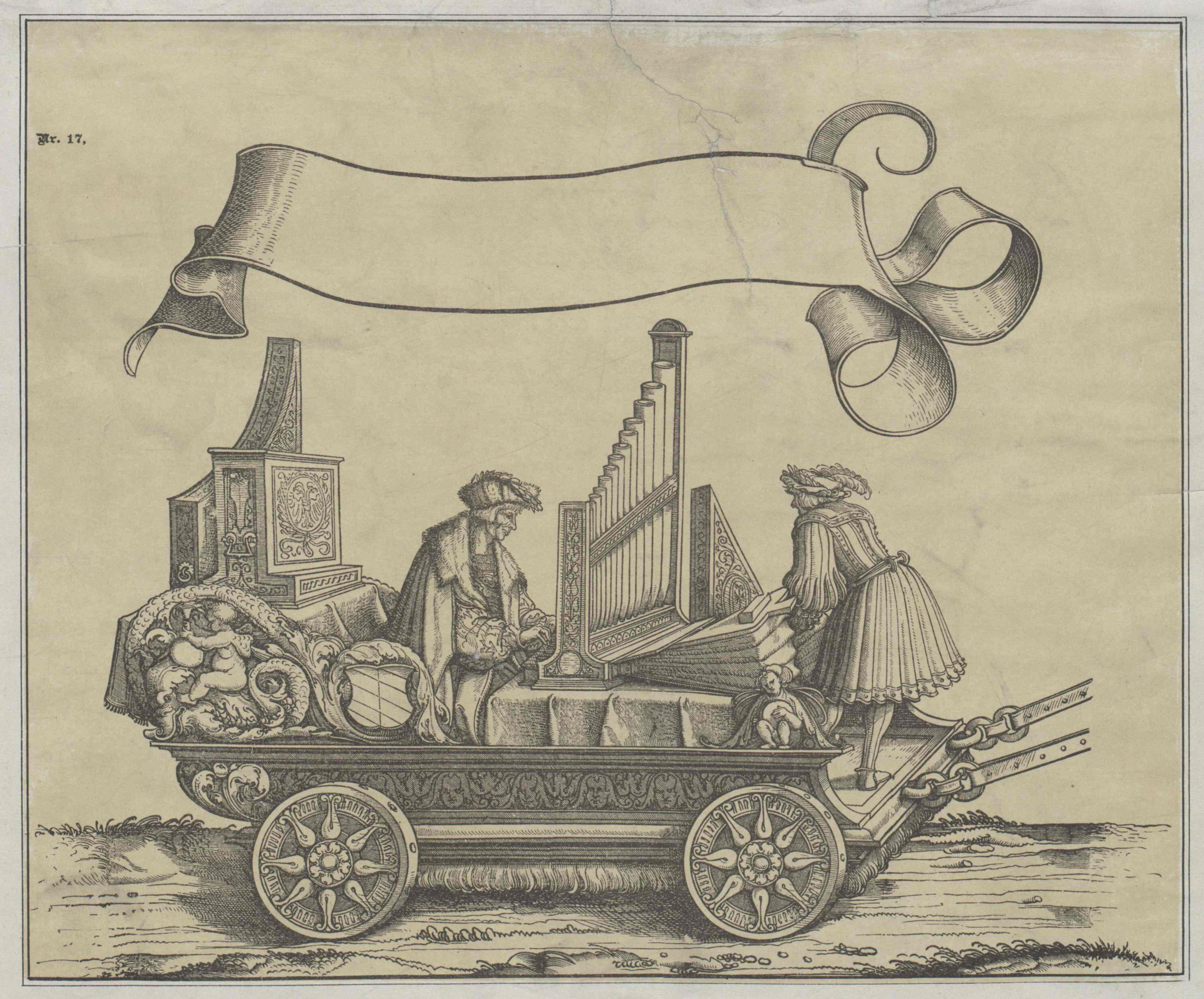
Paul Hofhaimer on a wagon with positive organ

Paul Hofhaimer (25 January 1459 – 1537) was an Austrian organist and composer. He was particularly gifted at improvisation, and was regarded as the finest organist of his age by many writers, including Vadian and Paracelsus; in addition he was one of only two German-speaking composers of the time (Heinrich Isaac was the other) who had a reputation in Europe outside of German-speaking countries. He is grouped among the composers known as the Colorists.

== Life ==
He was born in Radstadt, near Salzburg. Sources are somewhat contradictory on his early life, with Vadian asserting that he was self-taught, and the Nuremberg humanist Conrad Celtes saying that he acquired his technique at the court of Emperor Frederick III. Hofhaimer went to Innsbruck in 1478, and so impressed Archduke Sigismund of Tyrol that he was given a lifetime appointment as court organist in 1480. He almost certainly knew Heinrich Isaac well while he was in Innsbruck, since Isaac became court composer there later that decade.

In 1489 he began serving Maximilian I as organist, but he did this in addition to his Innsbruck service. In 1498, after several years of travel, during which he visited the Saxon court of Elector Frederick the Wise, he moved to Passau, and in 1507 he moved to Augsburg, where he could be closer to Maximilian. Maximilian and the king of Poland made him a knight and nobleman in 1515, conferring on him the title of "First Organist to the Emperor". Hofhaimer's last move was to Salzburg, where he remained as organist at Salzburg Cathedral until his death.

Life as a travelling musician at the peripatetic imperial court was harsh. Hofhaimer had to move frequently between Augsburg, Vienna, Innsbruck and other cities. The musicians even encountered mortal danger as they followed the Emperor during his military campaigns. Later, in 1524, when he had already joined the service of the Archbishop of Salzburg, Hofhaimer claimed in a letter to Vadian: Ich dannck got, das ich nymmer wye ayn zigeyner umraysen bedorff. [I thank God that I no longer have to travel like a gypsy.]

== Music and influence ==
Hofhaimer was a spectacularly gifted improviser, and witnesses attested to his unequaled gift; he could play for hours, never repeating himself: "one would wonder not so much how the ocean gets all the water with which to feed the rivers, but how this man gets the ideas for all his melodies." Not only was he a performing musician, though, he was the teacher of an entire generation of German organists: and the famous school of German organists of the Baroque era can trace much of its lineage to Hofhaimer. In addition, some of the organists he trained went on to Italy, for example Dionisio Memno, who became organist at St. Mark's in Venice, and there passed on technique learned from Hofhaimer to the organists who were part of the early Venetian school.

While he was most prolific as a composer for organ, little of that music has survived in its original form. Most of the surviving works are either lieder in three or four voices, or arrangements (intabulations) of them for either keyboard or lute. The large quantity of surviving copies of his songs from different locations in Europe, usually in arrangements, attests to their popularity. The handful of pieces for organ which have survived show Hofhaimer's gift for composing polyphonic lines around a cantus firmus.

His German lieder are typical of the time, and usually in bar form, with one section being polyphonic and the other being more chordal. He rarely used the smooth polyphonic texture then being cultivated by the Franco-Flemish composers such as Josquin or Gombert, a style he probably first encountered in Innsbruck with the music of Isaac.

Hofhaimer was also well known as an organ consultant, and frequently advised on the building and maintenance of organs.

== Commemoration ==
From 1969, (the 450th anniversary year of Emperor Maximilian I's death), the city of Innsbruck has awarded the Paul Hofhaimer Prize for interpretations of organ compositions by old masters. An international competition takes place every three years for the prize.
