= Harald Vogel =

German organist and organologist

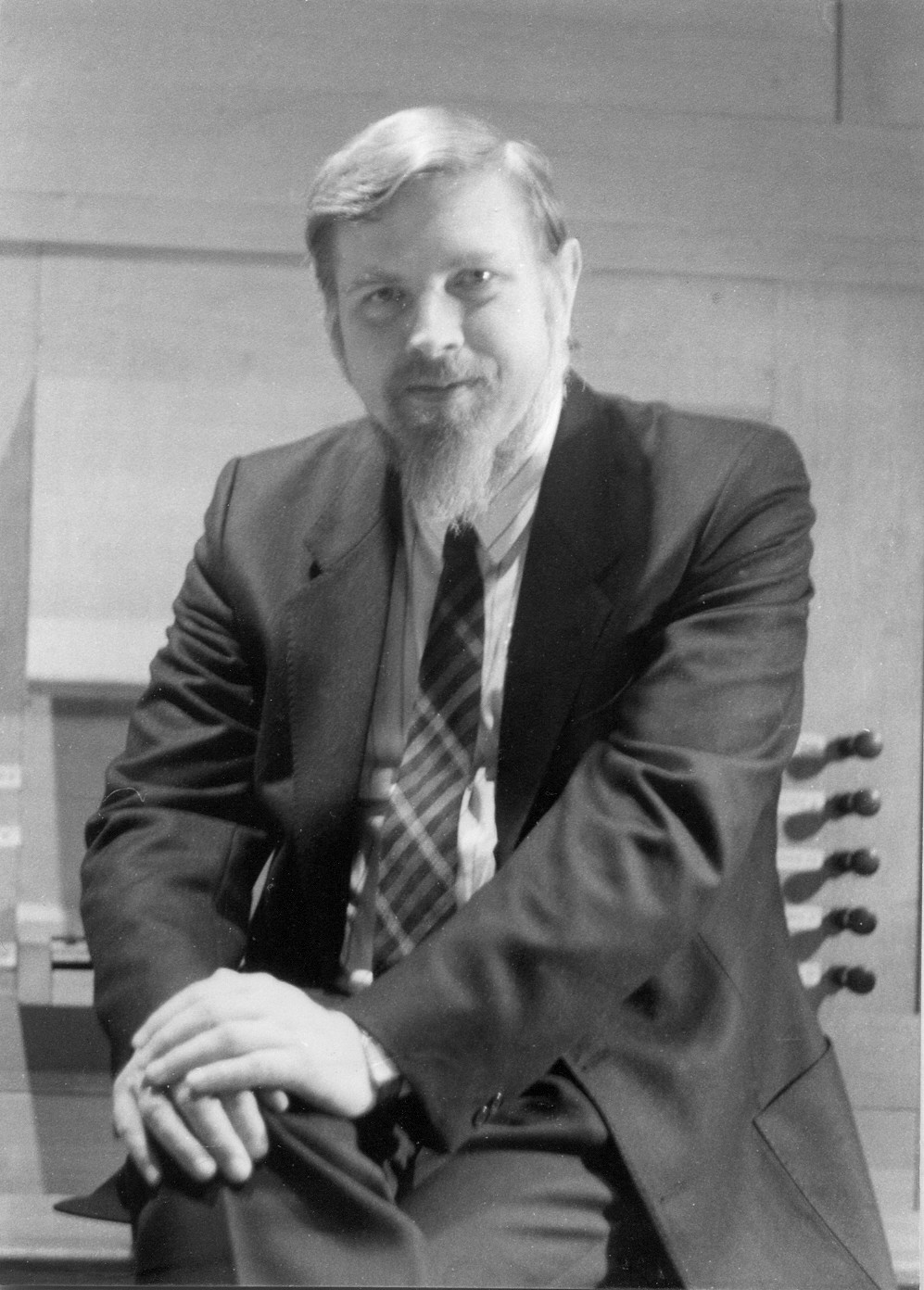
Vogel in 1990

Harald Vogel (born 21 June 1941 in Ottersberg) is a German organist, organologist, and author. He is a leading expert on Renaissance and Baroque keyboard music. He has been professor of organ at the University of the Arts Bremen since 1994.

== Books & articles ==
- "Acht kleine Präludien und Fugen von Johann Sebastian Bach," Musik und Kirche. No. 68, 1998. pp. 274–275.
- Arp Schnitger und sein Werk: Bildband mit den erhaltenen Orgeln und Prospekten Arp Schnitgers. Cor H. Edskes and Harald Vogel. Bremen: Hauschild, 2009. ISBN 978-3-89757-326-0
  - Dutch version: Arp Schnitger en zijn werk: fotoboek met de bewaard gebleven orgels en orgelfronten van Arp Schnitger. ISBN 978-3-89757-472-4
- Das Steinhaus in Bunderhee. Leer: Verlag Gerhard Rautenberg, 1978.
- "Dedesdorf, ein unbeachtetes Modell des norddeutschen Orgelbaus," Ars Organi. 48:4, 2000. pp. 213–216.
- Den Nordtyska Barockorgeln I Örgryte Nya Kyrka. Paul Peeters and Harald Vogel. Göteborg: Göteborgs Universitet, 2000.
- Denkmal Orgeln Teil 1. Backemoor - Groothusen. Beiträge zur Orgelkultur in Nordeuropa, 1, A. Fritz Schild and Harald Vogel. 2005. Wilhelmshaven: Noetzel.
- Denkmal Orgeln Teil 2. Hage - Wiesens. Beiträge zur Orgelkultur in Nordeuropa, 1, B. Fritz Schild and Harald Vogel. 2005. Wilhelmshaven: Noetzel.
- Die Neue "französische" Orgel: Kreuzkirche Stapelmoor. Stapelmoor: Ev.-reformierte Kirchengemeinde, 1997.
- "Die Norddeutsche Orgelakademie. Entstehung und Programm," Ostfriesland. No. 2, 1978. pp. 21–27.
- European Organ Tour, Bach and France: January 04–18, 1988. Westminster Choir College and Norddeutsche Orgelakademie. Bunde: Steinhaus Bunderhee, 1988.
- "Gedanken zur Kirchenmusik," Musik und Kirche. No. 68, 1998. p. 255ff.
- "Geleitwort," Hans Henny Jahnns Einfluss auf den Orgelbau. Thomas Lipski. Wiesbaden: Olms, 1997. pp. IX-XI. ISBN 3-487-10321-4.
- Hamburg's Role in Northern European Organ Building. Gustav Fock, Harald Vogel (foreword and appendix), Lynn Edwards, and Edward C. Pepe. Easthampton, MA: Westfield Center, 1997. ISBN 978-0-9616755-3-0
- "Het orgel te Anloo en de Noord-Duitse en Nederlandse orgelkunst in de 17e en 18e eeuw," Opus Magnum in de Magnuskerk te Anloo. Ed Panman, Henk van Eeken, and Harald Vogel. Anloo: Stichting Muziek in Anloo, 2002. ISBN 90-72938-23-2.
- "Historische Instrumente und Orgelbau heute," Musik und Kirche. No. 74, 2004. pp. 280–284.
- Kleine Orgelkunde: Dargestellt Am Modell Der Führer-Orgel in Der Altreformierten Kirche in Bunde. Wilhelmshaven: Hinrichshofen, 1981 R/2008. ISBN 3-7959-0334-3.
- "Mitteltönig – Wohltemperiert. Der Wandel der Stimmungsästhetik im norddeutschen Orgelbau und Orgelrepertoire des 17. und 18. Jahrhunderts," Jahrbuch Alte Musik. Band 1. Ed. Thomas Albert and Gisela Jaacks. Wilhelmshaven: Florian Noetzel, 1989. pp. 119–151. ISBN 3-7959-0543-5.
- "North German organ building of the late seventeenth century: registration and tuning," J. S. Bach As Organist: His Instruments, Music, and Performance Practices. Ed. George B. Stauffer and Ernest May. Bloomington: Indiana University Press, 1986. ISBN 978-0-253-33181-6
- "Organ restoration in the twentieth century," The North German Organ Research Project at Göteborg University. Ed. Joel Speerstra. Göteborg, Sweden: Göteborg Organ Art Center, Göteborg University, 2003. ISBN 978-91-972612-1-0
- Organs of Arp Schnitger: July 8–17, 1998. Harald Vogel and Lynn Edwards. Easthampton, MA: Westfield Center, 1998.
- Orgelgids Van De Eems-Dollard-Regio. Harald Vogel, Reinhard Ruge, Stef Tuinstra, and Enno Schmidt. Aurich: Arbeitsgemeinschaft Fremdenverkehrswerbung Ostfriesland, 1989.
- Orgellandschaft Ostfriesland. Harald Vogel, Reinhard Ruge, Robert Noah, and Martin Stromann. Norden: Soltau-Kurier, 1995. ISBN 3-928327-19-4, ISBN 978-3-928327-19-0
- Orgeln in Niedersachsen. Volkhard Hofer (photos) and Harald Vogel. Bremen: Hauschild, 1997. ISBN 3-931785-50-5, ISBN 978-3-931785-50-5
- "Sweelincks Orfeo. Die Fantasia Crommatica," Musik und Kirche. No. 75, 2005. p. 98ff.
- "The genesis and radiance of a court organ," The Organ As a Mirror of Its Time: North European Reflections, 1610-2000. Ed. Kerala J. Snyder. Oxford: Oxford University Press, 2002. pp. 48–59. ISBN 978-0-19-514414-7, ISBN 978-0195144154
- "The mixtures of the Örgryte organ," The North German Organ Research Project at Göteborg University. Ed. Joel Speerstra. Göteborg, Sweden: Göteborg Organ Art Center, Göteborg University, 2003. ISBN 91-972612-1-1, ISBN 978-91-972612-1-0
- "The romantic clavichord," Proceedings of the Göteborg International Organ Academy 1994. Hans Davidsson and Sverker Jullander. Göteborg: Department of Musicology, Göteborg University, 1995.
- Wegweiser Zu Den Orgeln Der Ems-Dollart-Region. Harald Vogel, Reinhard Ruge, and Stef Tuinstra. Aurich: Sehwege, Regionalagentur für Kulturtourismus der Ostfriesischen Landschaft, 1992.
- "Zur instrumentalen Aufführungsweise des Motettenrepertoires unter besonderer Berücksichtigung der Orgelintabulierungen," Orgel und Orgelspiel im 16. Jahrhundert. Ed. Walter Salmen. Rum: Helbing, 1978. p. 93–101. ISBN 3-85061-030-6.
- "Zur Interpretation des barocken Orgelrepertoires. Anmerkungen zum Verhältnis von Artikulation und Fingersatz," Der Kirchenmusiker. No. 33, 1982. pp. 4–11.
- "Zur Stimmung der Orgel in der Deutschen Kirche in Stockholm," Övertorneåprojektet. Om dokumentationen av orgeln i Övertorneå och rekonstruktionen av 1684 års orgel i Tyska kyrkan. Ed. Lena Weman Ericsson. Luleå: Musikhögskolan i Piteå, 1997. p. 27–65. ISBN 91-630-6095-7.

== Festschrift ==
- Orphei Organi Antiqui: Essays in Honor of Harald Vogel. ed. Cleveland Johnson. 2006. Orcas, WA: Westfield Center. ISBN 0-9778400-0-X.

== Scholarly editions ==
- Nicolaus Bruhns. Sämtliche Orgelwerke = Complete Organ Works. Wiesbaden: Breitkopf & Härtel, 2008.
- Vincent Lübeck. Sämtliche Orgelwerke = Complete Organ Works. Wiesbaden: Breitkopf & Härtel, forthcoming
- Jacob Wilhelm Lustig. XXIV Capricetten voor 't Clavier. Utrecht: Koninklijke Vereniging voor Nederlandse Muziekgeschiedenis, 2008. ISBN 978-90-6375-190-6.
- Samuel Scheidt. Tabulatura nova Teil I [1624]. Wiesbaden: Breitkopf & Härtel, 1994. ISBN 978-3-7651-8565-6.
- Samuel Scheidt. Tabulatura nova Teil II [1624]. Wiesbaden: Breitkopf & Härtel, 1999. ISBN 978-0-00120035-7.
- Samuel Scheidt. Tabulatura nova Teil III [1624]. Wiesbaden: Breitkopf & Härtel, 2002. ISMN 979-0004181225.
- Jan Pieterszoon Sweelinck Sämtliche Wercke für Tasteninstrument = Complete Keyboard Works. Ed. Harald Vogel and Pieter Dirksen. Wiesbaden: Breitkopf & Härtel, 2004.
  - Vol. 1 (Vogel), Toccatas; Vol. 2 (Dirksen), Fantasias; Vol. 3 (Vogel), Choral- und Psalmvariationen; Vol. 4 (Dirksen), Lied- und Tanzvariationen: SWV
- Michael Johann Friedrich Wiedeburg. Dritter Theil Des Sich Selbst Informirenden Clavier=spielers Worin Gezeiget Wird, Wie Ein Liebhaber Der Music Bey Fleissiger Selbst=information Nicht Allein Nach Und Nach Zum Fantasiren Auf Der Orgel Und Dem Clavier, Sondern Auch Zu Einer Geschichtlichkeit, Allerley Musicalische Stücke Zu Seinem Und Anderer Vergnügen Zu Verfertigen Und Zu Componiren Gelangen Kan [1767]. Band A & B. Ed. Reinhard Ruge and Harald Vogel. Wilhelmshaven: F. Noetzel, 2007. Band A: ISBN 3-7959-0881-7, ISBN 978-3-7959-0881-2; Band B: ISBN 3-7959-0882-5, ISBN 978-3-7959-0882-9

== Recordings (CD & LP) ==
- Arp Schnitger in Groningen. 1989. Rotterdam: Lindenberg Boeken & Muziek, LBCD12. Harald Vogel and Stef Tuinstra. Vogel perform works by J. S. Bach, Georg Friedrich Händel, Johann Mattheson in Godlinze (NL); Stef Tuinstra performs works by Matthias Weckmann, Jan Adam Reincken, Johann Pachelbel, Georg Böhm, in Eenum (NL).
- Arp Schnitger opera omnia. Vol. 1. 1990. [Hamburg]: Organa, ORA 3001. Works by Johann Adam Reincken, Samuel Scheidt, Heinrich Scheidemann, Johann Sebastian Bach
- Das Gesamtwerk für Orgel Harald Vogel spielt an der Cosmae-Orgel (1675) in Stade. 1984. Hamburg: Organa. Complete organ works of Vincent Lübeck
- D. Buxtehude and his time Harald Vogel plays on the dual-temperament Fisk-Organ at Stanford University. 1980. Hamburg: Organa, ORA 3208. Works by Johann Sebastian Bach, Nicolaus Bruhns, Dietrich Buxtehude, Heinrich Scheidemann.
- Die niederlandische Orgelkunst Jan P. Sweelinck und seine Zeit. 1984. Hamburg: Organa. Works by Jan Pieterszoon Sweelinck, Claude Goudimel, et al.
- Die Norddeutsche Orgelkunst I Harald Vogel spielt Werke von H. Scheidemann und M. Schildt an der St. Cosmae-Orgel (1675) in Stade. 1982. Hamburg: Organa.
- Die Norddeutsche Orgelkunst II Das goldene Zeitalter der norddeutschen Orgelkunst. 1986. Solingen, West Germany: Organa, ORA 3207. Works by Heinrich Scheidemann, Hieronymus Praetorius, Samuel Scheidt, Dietrich Buxtehude, et al. performed on the Arp Schnitger organ in Norden, Germany.
- Die Schnitgerorgel in der Aa-Kerk zu Gronigen Harald Vogel spielt norddeutsche Orgelmusik. 1970. Grevenbroich: Delta-Acustic. Works by Heinrich Scheidemann, Samuel Scheidt, and Johann Adam Reincken
- Die Spätgotische Orgelkunst Harald Vogel spielt an der Orgel zu Rysum (1457). 1982. Hamburg: Organa. Works by Pierre Attaingnant, Paul Hofhaimer, tablature of Adam Ileborgh, Leonhard Kleber, Hans Kotter, Conrad Paumann, and Arnolt Schlick.
- Dietrich Buxtehude Orgelwerke, Vol. 1. 1987. Musikproduktion Dabringhaus und Grimm, MD+G L 3268. Organs (Germany): Stellwagen in St. Jakobi, Lübeck; Arp Schnitger, Norden. BuxWV 138, 142, 143, 157, 161, 178, 185, 188, 192, 199, 212, 213, 217, 219, 222
- Dietrich Buxtehude Orgelwerke, Vol. 2. 1988. Musikproduktion Dabringhaus und Grimm, MD+G L 3269. Organs (Germany): Huß/Schnitger in St. Cosmæ, Stade; Arp Schnitger in Weener. BuxWV 136, 137, 139, 150, 164, 169, 172, 177, 180, 184, 187, 201, 207, 214, 215
- Dietrich Buxtehude Orgelwerke, Vol. 3. 1988. Musikproduktion Dabringhaus und Grimm, MD+G L 3270. Organs (Germany): Arp Schnitger in Grasberg; Wiese in Damp. BuxWV 76, 144, 145, 156, 159, 160, 171, 174, 186, 193, 194, 198, 202, 205
- Dietrich Buxtehude Orgelwerke, Vol. 4. 1991. Musikproduktion Dabringhaus und Grimm, MD+G L 3424. Organs (The Netherlands): Arp Schnitger in Noordbroek; Arp Schnitger in Der Aa-kerk of Groningen. BuxWV 141, 146, 149, 155, 167, 173, 189, 192, 197, 203, 206, 209, 220, 221, 223
- Dietrich Buxtehude Orgelwerke, Vol. 5. 1993. Musikproduktion Dabringhaus und Grimm MD+G L 3425. Organs (Germany): Grotian in Pilsum; Richborn in Buttforde; Kröger/Huß in Langwarden; Herbst/Gercke in Basedow; Hantelmann in Groß Eichsen. BuxWV 141, 146, 147, 151, 152, 168, 170, 175, 182, 183, 191, 211, 224, 245, 246
- Dietrich Buxtehude Orgelwerke, Vol. 6. 1993. Musikproduktion Dabringhaus und Grimm, MD+G L 3426. Organs (Denmark): Roskilde, Helsingør, and Torrlösa. BuxWV 143, 151, 154, 158, 162, 175, 176, 179, 195, 200, 204, 208, 225, 249, 250
- Dietrich Buxtehude Orgelwerke, Vol. 7. 1993. Musikproduktion Dabringhaus und Grimm, MD+G L 3427. Arp Schnitger organ in St. Jacobi of Hamburg, Germany. BuxWV 139, 140, 148, 153, 166, 181, 190, 198, 210, 218
- Guest recital: Harald Vogel, organ, May 27, 1973. Eugene: University of Oregon, School of Music.
- Historische Orgels 1. 2000. Ottersberg: Organeum, OC-39902. Works by Harald Vogel (improvisation), Johann Adam Reincken, Samuel Scheidt, Heinrich Scheidemann, Johann Sebastian Bach
- Historische Orgels 2. Radeker/Garrelsorgel Magnuskerk Anloo. 2006. Ottersberg: Organeum, AS-280406. Works by Jan Pieterszoon Sweelinck, Hendrik Speuy, Claude Goudimel, Antoni van Noordt, G. Havingha, Georg Böhm, Johann Willem Lustig.
- Johann Sebastian Bach Orgelwerke 1, Harald Vogel an der Ahrend-Orgel in San Simpliciano, Milano. 1991. Freiburg: Deutsche Harmonia Mundi, RD77202. BWV 535, 564, 572, 590, 700, 701, 710, 722, 723, 729, 990.
- M. Weckmann, D. Buxtehude, J.G. Walther, J.L. Krebs. 1989. Beilen: VLS Records, VLC 1189. Jan Jongepier improvises in Zuidbroek (NL); Harald Vogel performs works by Matthias Weckmann, Dietrich Buxtehude, Johann Gottfried Walther, and Johann Ludwig Krebs in Noordbroek (NL).
- Motets and Organworks. 1996. Georgsmarienhütte [Germany]: Classic Produktion Osnabrück, CPO 999215-2. Works of Jacob Praetorius, with Manfred Cordes and Weser-Renaissance
- Orgelland Ostfriesland. 1989. Deutsche Harmonia Mundi, HM 939-2. Organs in Norden, Uttum, Rysum, Westerhusen, Marienhafe, Weener. Works by Dietrich Buxtehude, Claude Goudimel, Jan Pieterszoon Sweelinck, Samuel Scheidt, Conrad Paumann, Arnolt Schlick, tablature of Adam Ileborgh, Paul Hofhaimer, Heinrich Isaac, Hans Leo Hassler, Georg Böhm, Johann Sebastian Bach.
- Orgeln in Ostfriesland. Vol. 1. 1996. Ottersberg: Organeum, OC-09601. Organs in Buttforde, Groothusen, Neermoor, Osteel, and Veenhusen, Germany. Works by Carl Philipp Emanuel Bach, Johann Ludwig Krebs, Johann Pachelbel, Heinrich Scheidemann, Samuel Scheidt, John Stanley, Jan Pieterszoon Sweelinck, Matthias Weckmann
- rereleased as The organs of Ostfriesland. (Northwest Germany). Volume I. 1999. Seattle, WA: Loft Recordings.
- Orgeln in Ostfriesland. Vol. 2. 1997. Ottersberg: Organeum, OC-09602. Organs in Marienhafe, Norden, Rysum, and Uttum, Germany. Works by Georg Böhm, Claude Goudimel, Paul Hofhaimer, Heinrich Isaac, Hans Kotter, Conrad Paumann, Heinrich Scheidemann, Arnolt Schlick, Hendrik Speuy, Jan Pieterszoon Sweelinck
- Portrait einer fürstlichen Orgel Harald Vogel spielt die Compenius-Orgel (1610) auf Schloss Frederiksborg. 1972. Hamburg: Organa. Works by Wolff Heckel, Melchior Neusidler, Heinrich Scheidemann, Jan Pieterszoon Sweelinck, Manuscript of Susanne van Soldt, et al.
- Recital at Church of the Ascension. 2000. Seattle, WA: Rezound, RZCD 5001. Works by Harald Vogel (improvisation), Johann Kaspar Kerll, Johann Pachelbel, Dietrich Buxtehude, Georg Böhm, Carl Philipp Emanuel Bach, Johann Sebastian Bach et al.
- Rund um Bach. Vol 1. 1998. Ottersberg: Organeum, OC-29701. Pedal clavichord. BWV 533, 535, 553, 554, 555, 556, 557, 558, 559, 560, 572, 599, 604, 614, 626, 629, 641, 642
- rereleased as The Bach Circle. Vol. 1. 2000. Seattle: Loft Recordings
- Rund um Bach. Vol 2. 1998. Ottersberg: Organeum OC-29702. Treutmann organ in Grauhof, Germany. Works by Johann Sebastian Bach, Georg Friedrich Kauffmann, Johann Ludwig Krebs, Georg Philipp Telemann, Harald Vogel (improvisation), and Johann Gottfried Walther
- rereleased as The Bach Circle. Vol. II. 2000. Seattle: Loft Recordings
- Rund um Bach. vol 3. 1998. Ottersberg: Organeum OC-29703. Arp Schnitger organ in Noordbroek, The Netherlands. Works by Elias Nikolaus Ammerbach, Carl Philipp Emanuel Bach, Johann Sebastian Bach, Gottfried August Homilius, Vincent Lübeck, Samuel Scheidt
- rereleased as The Bach Circle. Vol. III. 2000. Seattle: Loft Recordings
- Rund um die Welt. 1996. Ottersberg: Organeum OC-19601. John Brombaugh organ in Gothenburg, Sweden. Works by Johann Sebastian Bach, John Blitheman, Dietrich Buxtehude, Juan Cabanilles, Johann Nicolaus Hanff, Tarquinio Merula, Johann Pachelbel, François Roberday, Heinrich Scheidemann, Samuel Scheidt
- The Fisk organ at Wellesley College a revival of the meantone tradition : Harald Vogel plays works by Scheidt, Praetorius, Scheidemann and Buxtehude. 1985. Solingen: Organa. Works by Samuel Scheidt, Michael Praetorius, Jacob Praetorius, Heinrich Scheidemann, Dietrich Buxtehude
- The organ as a mirror of its time north European reflections, 1610-2000. 2002. New York, NY: Oxford University Press. Performers Hans Fagius, Harald Vogel, Alf Linder, Sverker Jullander, Erik Boström, and Hans Davidsson. Works by Dietrich Buxtehude (Vogel), dances from the Lublin tablature (Fagius), J. S. Bach (Linder), César Franck (Jullander), Bengt Hambraeus (Boström), and Matthias Weckmann (Davidsson)
- The Young Bach. 1999. Seattle, WA: Loft Recordings, LRCD 1009. BWV 531, 553-560, 709, 742, 767, 914, 1119, 1120.
- Vom Himmel hoch: weihnachtliche Kantaten und Motetten norddeutscher Meister. 1989. Freiburg: Freiburger Musik Forum; Ars Musici AME30062. Heinz Hennig (direction), Harald Vogel (Arp Schnitger organs in Weener and Norden), Knabenchor Hannover, and Fiori Musicali.
