= Cleveland Johnson =

Cleveland Thomas Johnson (born November 3, 1955) is an American academic, administrator, music historian, and early-music performer. He retired as President/CEO of the Morris Museum (Morristown, New Jersey) in 2022. Previously, he was Director of the National Music Museum (2012-2017, Vermillion, South Dakota), Executive Director of the Thomas J. Watson Fellowship (2008-2012, New York, New York), Dean of the School of Music at DePauw University (2006-2008, Greencastle, Indiana), Professor of Music at DePauw University (1985-2012), and Music Librarian at Old Dominion University (1983-1985; Norfolk, Virginia). DePauw University awarded him the title, Professor Emeritus of Music, in 2012.

== Education ==
Johnson received the B.Mus. degree in 1977 with majors in Music History and Organ Performance from the Oberlin College Conservatory of Music, where he studied organ with Fenner Douglas and William Porter. With a Thomas J. Watson Fellowship, he studied historic performance practice from 1977 to 1978 at the Norddeutsche Orgelakademie (Bunderhee, Germany) with Harald Vogel and Klaas Bolt on the historic pipe organs of East Frisia (Germany) and the Province Groningen (Netherlands). Early in his career, he introduced English-speaking scholars to the potential research value of historic organs in Ostfriesland (East Frisia) in the journal, Early Music. Much later, he covered this topic for The Organ: An Encyclopedia. On the occasion of Harald Vogel's 65th birthday, Johnson compiled a Festschrift in his honor, Orphei Organi Antiqui. Essays in Honor of Harald Vogel, containing research by Bolt, Porter, and many former Vogel students and colleagues.

To remain in close proximity to the sources of his academic research and performance, focused primarily on the organ culture of northern Europe, Johnson remained in Europe and was enrolled at Oxford University (Christ Church College) from 1978—studying with Denis Arnold, Anthony Baines, John Caldwell, Simon Preston, and Alan Tyson, receiving the Doctor of Philosophy in Music in 1984, with a dissertation on 16th- and 17th-century organ tablatures.

He conducted doctoral research in Germany during the years 1980–82, including a year in East Frisia, as research assistant to Harald Vogel, and a year at the University of Göttingen under Wolfgang Boetticher, funded by the German Academic Exchange Service. During this period, Johnson also performed with the Groningse Bachvereiniging, specializing in historic choral performance practice, and with the baroque chamber ensemble, Fiori musicali, [directed by Thomas Albert (baroque violin), with Niklas Trüstedt (viola da gamba), and Stephen Stubbs (lute)], recording for Radio Bremen and Récreation Records.]

Rather than an exhaustive manuscript study of a single source, which was a common research practice of the period, Johnson's dissertation looked broadly at a complete corpus of 58 related manuscript tablatures (as well as 9 printed tablatures) and may be considered an early example of the data-mining methodology often used in the field of Digital Humanities, made possible by early word-processor technology. This dissertation was the first digitally-produced thesis in Music at Oxford and included in the series, Outstanding Dissertations in Music from British Universities (ed. John Caldwell, New York/London: Garland Publishing, 1989). Part Two of his dissertation, a catalog of the contents—approximately 6000 compositions—contained in the sources he studied, was later organized into an online database to be easily accessible and searchable by scholars.

== Academic career ==
Johnson returned to the United States in 1982, where his first professional position was as music librarian at Old Dominion University (Norfolk, Virginia.) He entered the professoriate in 1985 at DePauw University (Greencastle, Indiana), where he spent his entire teaching career, beginning as assistant professor in 1985, tenured as associate professor in 1991, promoted to full Professor in 2000, University Professor in 2007, and Professor Emeritus in 2012. Despite his organist training, he did not teach organ but spent his career in the classroom and seminar room, teaching primarily Music History, Music Appreciation, and advanced topics courses in Musicology. He was an early advocate for first-year-experience education at DePauw, and taught many years in that program—both in January-term as well as semester-long courses, both in Music as well as non-Music topics. He also brought Music into the Honors Scholar Program at DePauw, teaching a course on the “Art and Politics of Weimar and Nazi Germany,” examining the place of art, drama, literature, and music in the first four decades of twentieth-century Germany.

During his early academic career, Johnson's research concentrated on the historic North-European pipe organ, its literature, as well as its unique tablature notation, about which he published. He continued to leverage early digital technology for his research, such as an article on a rare, keyboard diminution manual of his discovery.

He realized and tapped the potential of the early internet to publish a manuscript study—impossible to present in printed-journal format—that, using color-coded image overlays, revealed how multiple layers of music notation accreted over time in a manuscript from Samuel Scheidt or his circle of students.

His interest in active-learning pedagogy and classroom technology was supported directly by grants from the Lilly Foundation and, through DePauw, with support from the Great Lakes College Association and the Mellon Foundation and DePauw's internal Fisher Fellowships. Johnson was an early adopter of web-based technology in the university classroom. His course, “Virtual Vienna,” first taught in 1997, involved students in producing online content while preparing them for overseas study in Vienna, Austria. His courses in Music History and South-Asian music also involved students, already in the 1990s, in producing digital anthologies and research papers with embedded images and (later) audio and video.

Johnson's work on the historic organs and literature of North Germany culminated in a recording project of six CDs for Calcante Recordings, recorded in 1996 and 1997. Having transcribed and edited Heinrich Scheidemann's motet intabulations for Heinrichshofen Verlag, he documented, together with the German organist, Claudia Wortman, the complete organ works of Heinrich Scheidemann, on historic German organs of the period: St. Cosmas and Damian, Stade, built by Berendt Huß and Arp Schnitger from 1668 to 1675, and St. Stephen's, Tangermünde, completed by Hans Scherer (“the Younger”) completed in 1624. A third organ was also involved in the project, namely the historically-designed instrument in Houghton Chapel, Wellesley College, completed in 1981 by Charles Fisk.

Johnson remained active as a performer, in addition to his teaching and research, until 2006. He was an organist/choirmaster for numerous congregations, often spearheading projects for new organ installations, including First Presbyterian (Huron, OH), Calvary United Methodist (Brownsburg, IN), and St. Andrew's Episcopal (Greencastle, IN). He concluded his church-music career as a professional alto in the Men and Boys Choir of Christ Church Cathedral (Indianapolis, Indiana), one of the last such choirs in the United States preserving the Anglican cathedral choral tradition.

== Research in India ==
In 1999, the Indiana Network for the Development of India Awareness funded Johnson to take a five-week study trip to South India, where he first encountered Carnatic music. In 2001-2002 he returned to India for a sabbatical year, funded by the National Endowment for the Humanities through the American Institute of Indian Studies. During that year, the first of many extended research trips, he studied the history and performance practice of the South-Asian harmonium, conducting oral interviews with the major Hindustani harmonium performers in North India, including Tulsidas Borkar, Manohar Chimote, Appa Jalgaonkar, Vidyahar Oke, and Arvind Thatte, and harmonium builders, such as Pratap Ghosh of the Dwarkin & Son company. Despite his research in the North, Johnson lived in the southern city of Chennai, studying carnatic singing and participating in the 155th Tyagaraja Aradhana in Thiruvaiyaru. As a visiting Western scholar, he was also invited to perform an inventory of the British-era pipe organs in Chennai for the Church of South India and, through his presentations on this topic to the British Institute of Organ Studies and the American Guild of Organists, helped attract support to restore several historic instruments in Chennai, including the organs in St. Mary's Church of Fort St. George, Chennai, and St. Andrew's Church, Chennai. He also served as a consulting advisor for the foundation of the KM Music Conservatory in Chennai, launched by A.R. Rahman in 2008, and recruited several early faculty members.

His time in India led to a complete shift in his research and teaching interests. At DePauw University, he brought the teaching of a non-Western music tradition into the curriculum for the first time. With funding from the ASIANetwork, in 2003–2004, he involved a small team of DePauw School of Music students in a digital-humanities project in Chennai, India, gathering data from over 2400 compositions in almost 300 live concerts during the Madras Music Season, revealing the relatively small number of ragas actually used in performance from among the thousands of theoretically-possible ragas. This database and analysis was published online for open access.

== Non-profit career ==
In 2008, having served as Dean of the School of Music at DePauw since 2006—during which time he oversaw the move of the School of Music into the new Joyce and Judson Green Performing Arts Center—Johnson took a leave of absence to become executive director of the Thomas J. Watson Fellowship (New York, New York) Johnson was the last in a series of sixteen alumni directors, each of whom served two- or three-year terms, administering the same organization that had funded them, post-baccalaureate, early in their careers. He was executive director during the Great Recession in the United States, and oversaw a needed reduction in the number of Watson-affiliated colleges and universities. At the end of his term, he assembled previous Watson directors to evaluate how the fellowship program had evolved during more than four decades of serial leadership.

From 2012 to 2017 he was Director of the National Music Museum in South Dakota, after retiring officially from DePauw as Professor Emeritus. Johnson, following the NMM's founding director, André Larson, of almost forty years, was tasked with building the high-functioning organization and facilities that the NMM's collection required. Johnson shifted focus, from the aggressive collecting of his predecessor, to institution building. The NMM received a new public face (through the launch of its Facebook page in February 2013, its Google Cultural Institute page, and a new website), and international visibility, through strategic loans (Berlin, Musikinstrumenten-Museum; Brussels, Musée des Instruments de Musique; New York, Metropolitan Museum of Art, etc.) and national media attention. Under his leadership the Museum became a Smithsonian Affiliate.

He concluded his museum career at the Morris Museum in Morristown, New Jersey as President/CEO, serving from 2017 through 2021. He led the institution, home to the Murtogh D. Guinness Collection of Mechanical Musical Instruments and Automata, to adopt a new mission that explores intersections of "art, sound, and motion," leveraging that collection of historical technology to examine contemporary topics such as robotics, music-on-demand, binary coding, artificial intelligence, and video gaming. Under his leadership the Museum became a Smithsonian Affiliate, mounted the first exhibition of graffiti painted directly on museum walls, "Aerosol," presented the first solo museum exhibition of the Safarani Sisters (Farzaneh and Bahareh Safarani), and established a partnership with "Art in the Atrium," a non-profit supporting the work of African-American artists such as David Driskell, Willie Cole, Deborah Willis, Benny Andrews, Elizabeth Catlett, Bisa Butler, Janet Taylor Pickett and Faith Ringgold. Johnson retired in 2022. with his final exhibit being "Joie De Vivre" by the multimedia artist, Federico Solmi, for which he edited the exhibition catalog.

== Publications (selected) ==
- Cleveland Johnson, “The Madras Microtone Harmonium” in the Galpin Society Journal 78 (2025): pp. 73-93.
- Cleveland Johnson (ed.): Federico Solmi: Escape into the Metaverse (London: Black Dog Press, 2022). ISBN 978-1-912165-47-6
- Cleveland Johnson, “The Origins of the ‘Indian’ Harmonium: Evidence from the Colonial Press and London Patent Office” in the Journal of the American Musical Instrument Society 44 (2018): pp. 144–178.
- Cleveland Johnson, “An All-but-Extinct Piano Plays Once More” in The New York Times (August 31, 2018).
- Cleveland Johnson (ed.): Orphei Organi Antiqui. Essays in Honor of Harald Vogel (Ithaca: Westfield Center, 2006). ISBN 0-9778400-0-X. Vogel's early students are identified in the article, “Harald Vogel: Teacher” by Elizabeth Harrison, pp. 9–31.
- Cleveland Johnson, “The First All-India Music Conferences and the advent of modern Indian musicology.” In: Zdravko Blažeković, Barbara Dobbs Mackenzie (eds.): Music’s Intellectual History. (New York: Répertoire International de Littérature Musicale, 2009), ISBN 978-1-932765-05-2, pp. 551–557.
- Girolamo Frescobaldi, Fiori musicali. Calvert Johnson (ed.) in the series, Music’s Intellectual History (Colfax: Wayne Leupold Editions, 2008), with contributions by Cleveland T. Johnson.
- Cleveland Johnson, “Ems-Dollart Region.” in Douglas E. Bush, Richard Kassel (eds.): The Organ. An Encyclopedia (New York, London: Routledge, 2006), ISBN 0-415-94174-1, pp. 170–172.
- Cleveland Johnson, “Tabulatur.” in Douglas E. Bush, Richard Kassel (eds.): The Organ. An Encyclopedia (New York, London: Routledge, 2006), ISBN 0-415-94174-1, pp. 555–558.
- The Madras Season of 2003/04: A Searchable Database of Featured Ragas, Composers, and Compositions 2004 Online (2004)
- "Vocal Compositions in German Organ Tablatures, 1550-1650: A Searchable Database" Online (2003)
- Cleveland Johnson, "In the Trenches with Johann and Caspar Plotz: a rediscovered Gebrauchstabulatur from the Scheidt Circle," 2001 Online
- Cleveland Johnson (ed.), Heinrich Scheidemann: 12 Orgelintavolierungen, 3 vols. (Wilhelmshaven: Heinrichshofen Verlag, 1990–1993).
- Cleveland Johnson, "A Keyboard Diminution Manual in Bártfa Ms. 27: Keyboard Figuration in the Time of Scheidt" in Church, Stage, and Studio. Music and its Contexts in Seventeenth-Century Germany (Ann Arbor: UMI Research Press, 1990), pp. 279–347. ISBN 978-0835719384
- Cleveland Johnson, Vocal Compositions in German Organ Tablatures, 1550-1650. A Catalogue and Commentary, in the series, Outstanding Dissertations in Music from British Universities. (New York: Garland Publishing, 1989), ISBN 082402012X.
- Cleveland Johnson, “New German Organ Tablature. Its Rise and Demise.” In: Charles Brenton Fisk. Essays in his Honor. Easthampton, Massachusetts: The Westfield Center for Early Keyboard Studies, 1987, ISBN 978-0961675516, pp. 93–109.
- Cleveland Johnson, Keyboard Intabulations Preserved in Sixteenth- and Seventeenth-Century German Organ Tablatures. A Catalogue and Commentary. (Dissertation, Oxford University, 1984).
- Cleveland Johnson, “A Modern Approach to the Historic Organ,” in Early Music. vol. 8/2, April 1980, pp. 173–177.

== Discography ==
- The Organ Works of Heinrich Scheidemann. Vol. 1. Calcante Recordings. CAL-023. 1999. 2 CD (Cleveland Johnson and Claudia Heberlein Johnson in Stade/St. Cosmae, Tangermünde, and Wellesley
- The Organ Works of Heinrich Scheidemann. Vol. 2. Calcante Recordings. CAL-024. 1999. 2 CD (Cleveland Johnson and Claudia Heberlein Johnson in Stade/St. Cosmae, Tangermünde, and Wellesley)
- The Organ Works of Heinrich Scheidemann. Vol. 3. Calcante Recordings. CAL-025. 2003. 2 CD (Cleveland Johnson and Claudia Heberlein Johnson in Stade/St. Cosmae, Tangermünde, and Wellesley)
- Italienische Solomusik um 1630. Récreation. TGS 302. 1982. LP (Works of D. Castello, G.B. Fontana, C. Merula, A. Piccinini, G. Frescobaldi).
- Samuel Scheidt: “Ich ruf zu dir;” from the Lüneburger Tabulatures: “O Lamm Gottes,” and “O wir armen Sünden;“ and (with the Groningse Bachvereniging) Christoph Demantius, Johannespassion, Groningse Bachvereniging cassette recording, 1981.

== Public presentations (selected) ==
- “The Madras ‘Sruti’ Harmonium and its Precedents” at the joint annual conference of the American Musical Instrument Society and the Galpin Society (Edinburgh, UK) 2017.
- “How Indian is the Indian Harmonium: Evidence from the Colonial Press and London Patent Office” at the joint annual conference of the Galpin Society and CIMCIM (Oxford, England) 2013.
- “The Soldier’s Musical Arsenal” at the CIMCIM annual conference and ICOM general assembly (Milan, Italy) 2016.
- “The Historical Collector as Entrepreneur: Reasons, Means, and Background for Collecting” at the CIMCIM annual conference (Stockholm, Sweden) 2014.
- “The Ground Bass as an Organizing and Generating Form for Western Improvisation” at the Third International Conference for Music and Dance (Theme: “Classical Forms in World Music” – Bangalore, India) 2014.
- “The State of the Pipe Organ in South Asia Today” at the 2006 national convention of the American Guild of Organists (Chicago, IL)
- “The First ‘All-India’ Music Conferences and the Advent of Modern Indian Musicology” at the conference “Music’s Intellectual History: Founders, Followers, and Fads,” the first conference of the Répertoire International de Littérature Musicale (New York, NY) 2005.
- "The Victorian Organ in Colonial and Post-Colonial India" at the 2003 conference, "The Organ in Context" of the British Institute of Organ Studies, Barber Institute of Fine Arts, Birmingham, England.
- “Teaching with Technology ‑ The Roles People Play” (panelist) at the Consortium of Liberal Arts Colleges, annual meeting, Wabash College/DePauw University, 2000.
- “An Approach to Integrating World Music, Improvisation, and Music History into a Single Course for First-Year Music Students” at the College Music Society, Great Lakes Chapter meeting, 2000 (Ball State University).
- “Virtual Vienna: On-Campus Preparation for Off-Campus Study” at the conference, “Best Practices in International Studies," of the Indiana Consortium for International Programs, Indianapolis, IN. 2000.
- “Virtual Vienna: On-Campus Preparation for Off-Campus Study” at the Great Lakes College Association conference, “The World is Our Campus,” Albion College, MI. 2000.
