= St. Mary's Church, Himmelpforten =

St. Mary's Church
- German: Sankt Marienkirche; Low German: Sünt Marienkark
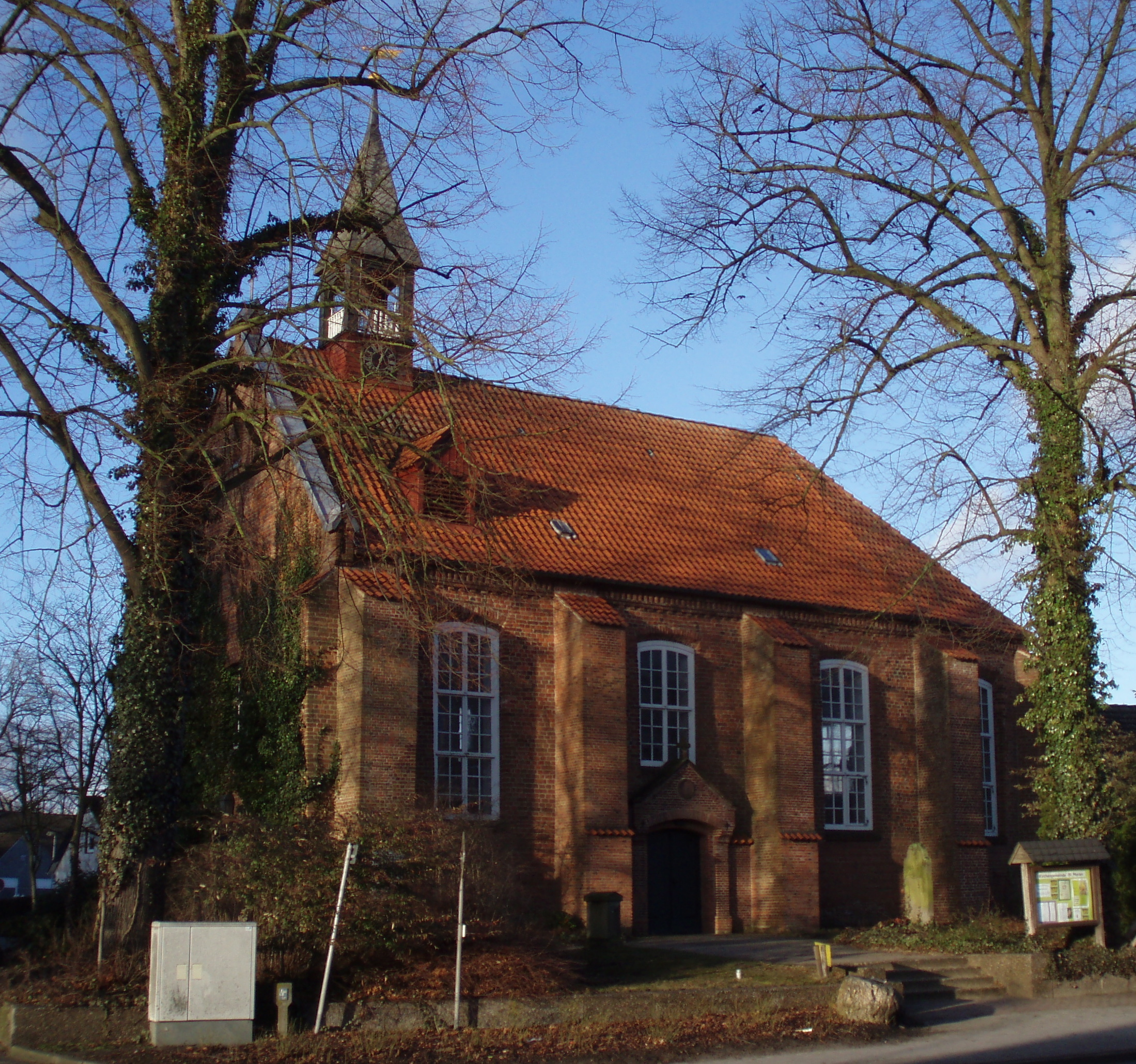
- St. Mary's Church, southern façade seen from the Main Street

- Location within Lower Saxony Location within Germany
- 53°36′52″N 09°18′17″E
- Location: Himmelpforten
- Country: Germany
- Denomination: Lutheran
- Website: www.kirchenkreis-stade.de/gemeinden/himmelpforten

History
- Former name: Dreifaltigkeitskirche (Trinity Church)
- Status: Parish church
- Dedication: St. Mary

Architecture
- Functional status: Active
- Architects: Otto Heinrich von Bonn (design); Christian Götze (construction)
- Architectural type: aisleless church quire oriented
- Groundbreaking: 1737
- Completed: 1738

Specifications
- Length: 23.5 m (77 ft)
- Width: 11.75 m (38.5 ft)
- Materials: Brick

Administration
- Diocese: Stade diocese
- Deanery: Stade deanery
- Parish: Himmelpforten

Clergy
- Pastor: Christian Plitzko

The Saint Mary's Church (Low German: Sünt Marienkark, German: Sankt Marienkirche) is a Lutheran parish church used and owned by the Lutheran parish in Himmelpforten, Lower Saxony, Germany. The Himmelpforten parish forms part of the Stade deanery (Kirchenkreis) within the Stade diocese of the Lutheran Church of Hanover. The church was completed in 1738 and covers the eastern half of the foundations of the demolished abbey church of the former Himmelpforten Convent.

== History ==
Today's church was erected in 1738 using rests of the former abbey church which had mostly been torn down due to dilapidation in 1737. The previous Cistercian church building was the abbey of the former Conventus Porta Coeli, in 1255 relocated to Himmelpforten on the instigation of the Prince-Archbishop of Bremen. From the beginning on the abbey church served also as the parish church of the local parish (Kirchspiel Himmelpforten).

Noble families from the Elbe–Weser triangle (Bremian ministerialis) bestowed land and dues on the Cistercian nunnery, enabling it to sustain their unmarried kinswomen. The nuns, and later the Lutheran conventuals (after the Reformation), elected a provost as their legal male representative to the outside. The provost was entitled to nominate the candidates (ius nominandi) to be appointed as pastors in the parishes of Großenwörden, Himmelpforten, and Horst upon Oste.

Prince-Archbishop Christopher the Spendthrift's financially burdensome reign (1511–1547 and again 1549–1558) and prodigal lifestyle fostered the spreading of the Reformation in the Prince-Archbishopric of Bremen. The conversion of the nuns followed the spreading of Lutheranism among the noble families from whom they originated. By 1550/1555 the Porta Coeli nunnery had transformed into a Lutheran Damsels' Convent, since its aim - to sustain unmarried noble women - was to be maintained. In 1556 Provost Engelbert Gripenstroet/Griepenstroth nominated the first Lutheran preacher for the abbey of Porta Coeli, whom then the competent archdeacon, in personal union the provost of the Bremen Cathedral chapter, invested according to his ius investiendi.

Between 1628 and 1629 during the Catholic Leaguist conquest and subsequent occupation of the Prince-Archbishopric in the course the Thirty Years' War most Protestant preachers fled the area or were exiled. So also Himmelpforten's Lutheran preachers Hermann Marsmann and Ludolphus Eggebert(us) fled.

On 19/29 November^{O.S./N.S.} Jacob Brummer and Wilhelm Schröder, subdelegates of the Restitution Commission ordered the Prioress Gerdruth von Kampe to deliver all liturgical devices which they appropriated in favour of the commission. On 22 November/ 2 December 1629^{O.S./N.S.} all the seized liturgical devices of Himmelpforten's church were handed over to the Jesuit Father Matthias Kalkhoven, and disappeared with the Jesuits in April 1632. Only one chalice from 1422, preserved until today, remained with the convent.

Since 1630 the Himmelpforten Convent had been deprived of its revenues, first in favour of the Jesuits, subsequently in favour of the Administrator regnant John Frederick, then of the new seigniorial local lord Count Gustaf Adolf Lewenhaupt/Löwenhaupt and his son, and finally thereafter in favour of the general government of Swedish Bremen-Verden, succeeding the Prince-Archbishopric since 1648. So for lack of funds and maintenance the convent buildings and the church fell into decay.

In 1681 Samuel Friedrich Riedell, bailiff of the seigniorial Amt Himmelpforten, informed Bremen-Verden's Governour-General Henrik Horn about the expert report of Master Mason Daniel Sommer from Stade that many of the vaults and the western gable of the abbey church were on the verge to collapse, the same was true for most of the outside walls, already giving way to the pressure by the deranged vaults. In 1684 the Bremen-Verdian general government ordered a greater repair of the decayed church, and also the remaining convent buildings were restored to some extent, all carried out by the socage farmers.

During the vacancy of the pastorate (1696–1703), on 13 May 1699 representatives of the Himmelpforten parish handed in an expertise by the judges Johann Schröder (Großenwörden), Erich Schlichting (Breitenwisch), Master Carpenter Erich Dede and Master Mason Hinrich Vörder, describing the former abbey church as being well preserved. According to their report the abbey's external dimensions measured Bremian feet 141 (40.8 metres [134 ft]) in length and Br. ft 46 (13.31 metres [43.7 ft]) in width, whereas its vault ceiling reached a height of Br. ft 44 (12.73 metres [41.8 ft]). The abbey comprised seven bays with 21 pillars carrying the vaulted ceiling. However, the aim of this expertise was to urge the General Government to restaff the pastorate. On 21 January 1706 the new Pastor Michael Schreiner reported the bad shape of the pastorate to his superiors.

Now Bremen-Verden's General Government reacted and began rebuilding the whole convent compound. In 1732 the old pastorate was replaced by a new building recycling preserved parts of the old pastorate and the old bailiff's office. Otto Heinrich von Bonn (1703–1785), Landbaumeister (i.e. State Construction Master, about public works architect) planned to renovate the existing church, and calculated cost of Rixdollar (Rtlr) 2,290:26:00.

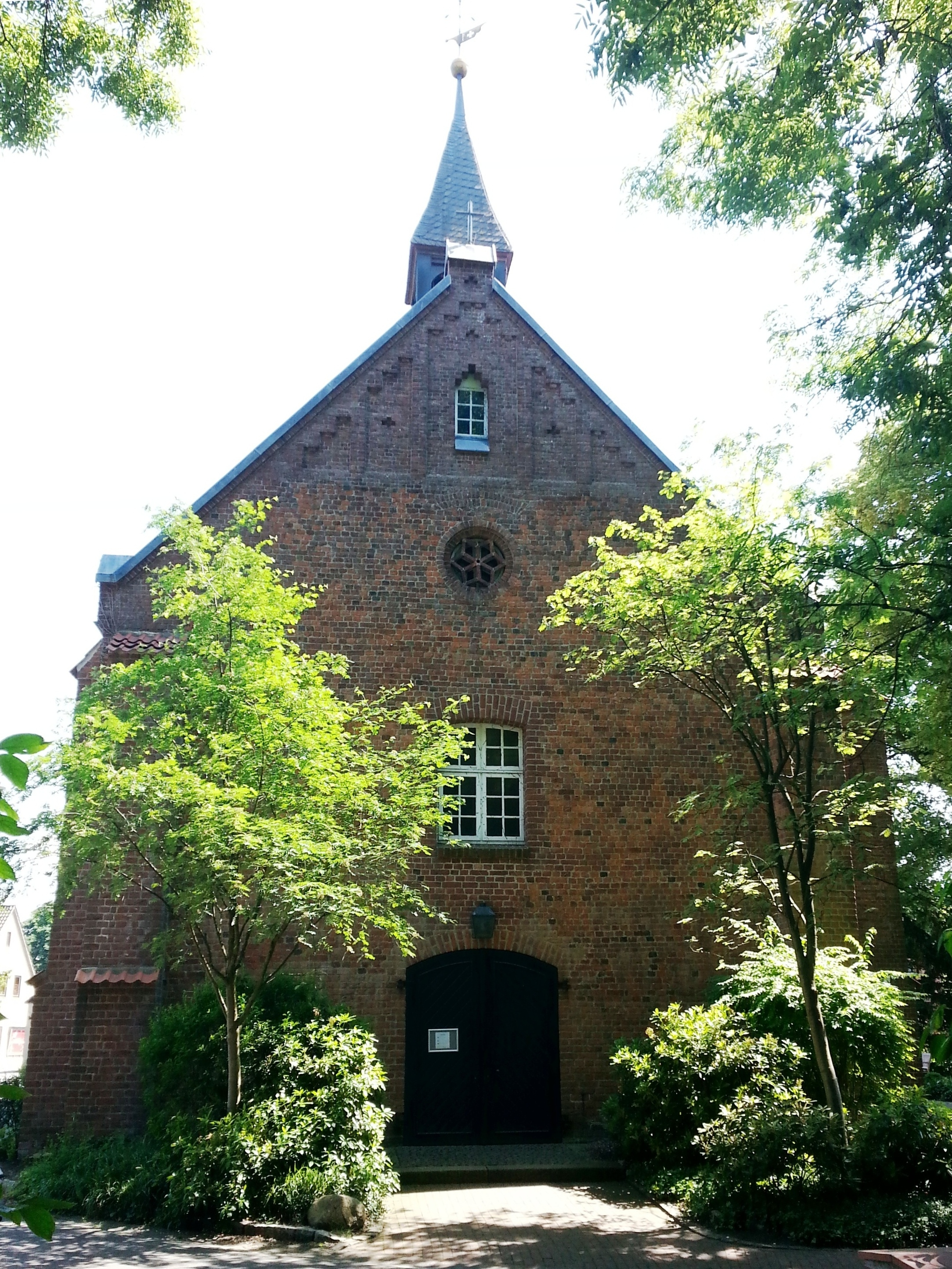
The western façade

== Building and furnishings ==
=== Current building ===
However, Bonn's plan was not acknowledged by the general government of British-Hanoverian Bremen-Verden and thus the old church was mostly torn down in 1737, and rebuild to half of its previous length and slightly narrower. In 1738 Master Mason Christian Götze led the new construction. The new church was inaugurated in the same year and dedicated to the Holy Trinity. Like the abbey the present church is oriented. The eastern part of the northern wall and the adjacent part of the apsis wall of the old abbey church were maintained and thus integrated into the else new structure of today's St. Mary's. Generally the present church has smaller windows than the abbey, so that the bigger window openings in the preserved northern wall are now partially blocked up to fit the smaller windows.

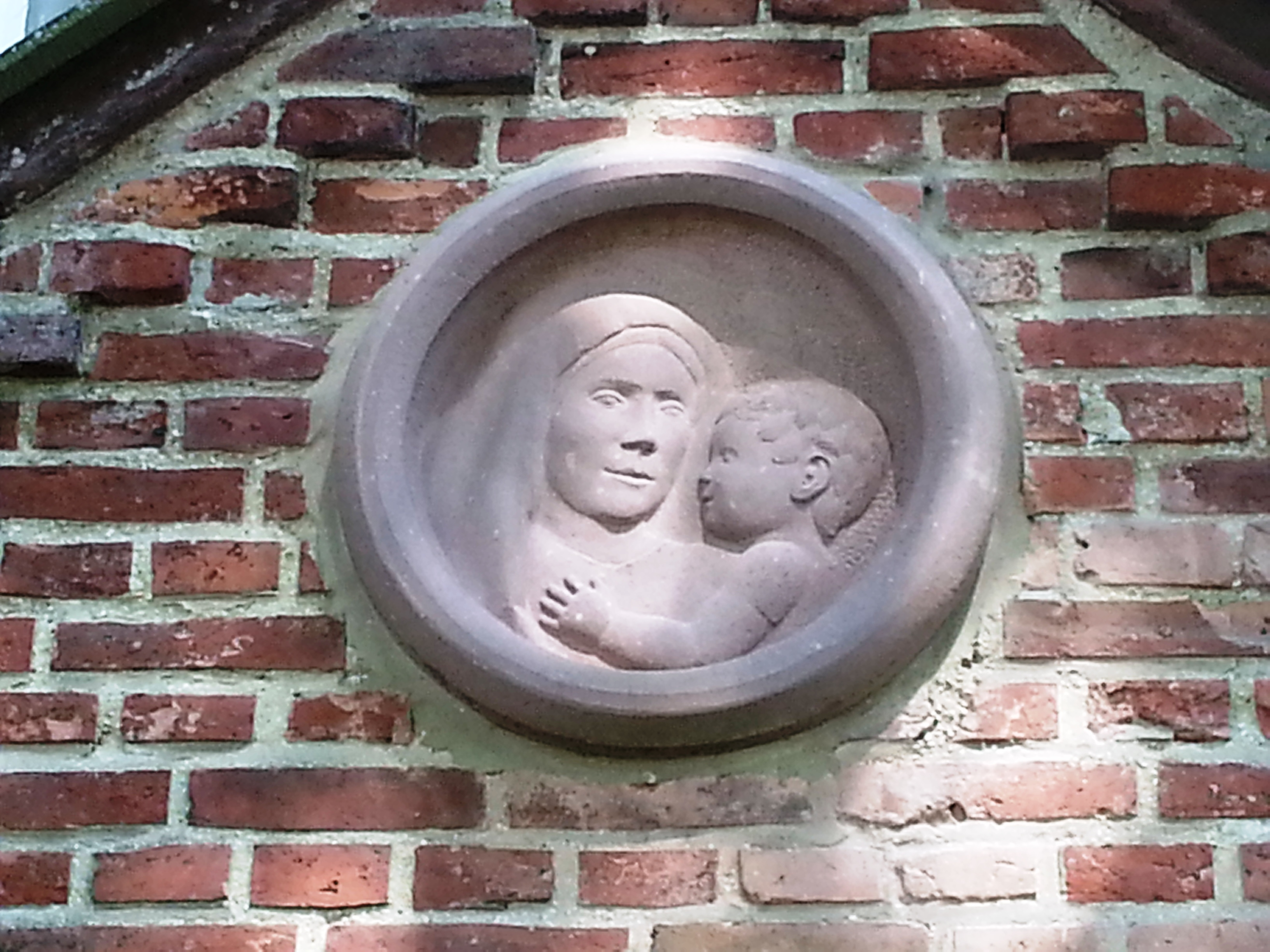
Relief medallion of Madonna and child above the southern entrance

The new western façade was partially built with brick in Klosterformat gained from the rubble of the demolished abbey. Since the apsis is at its original location the western façade of the shorter new church (23.5 m [77 ft]) stands within the scope of the length of the former abbey (40.5 m [133 ft]). The present church is also slightly narrower than the abbey, which is why today's apsis, including a northern section of that of the previous abbey, is somewhat irregular. Like the previous church of a mendicant Cistercian order the new church has no spire but only a wooden ridge turret. The ceiling is completely flat. In 1759 the Amt Himmelpforten adjusted the church attic as a seigniorial granary for the dues in kind it collected, a wheel of the crane of which is preserved under the roof until today. In 1877 the southerly entrance was added a brick portico with a sandstone cross and plaque.

=== Furnishings ===
Inside, above the western door there is a decorated relief monogrammed with the initials G.R.II in honour of the then Supreme Governor of the Lutheran church, George II, King and Elector of Great Britain and Hanover. The congregation owns two chalices, one from 1422 and another donated by the convent's last Prioress Gerdruth von Kampe in 1636. Furthermore, there are a paten granted by the Conventual Anna Voss in 1648, and a silver, internally gilded jug, created in 1780 fulfilling the last will of the widow of Bailiff Tiling, née Prilop (d. 1779).

In 1684 on the occasion of the renovation of the abbey, during the term of Bailiff Lothar Feindt, an unknown donator granted a wooden putto which was later translated to the new church. The offertory box is a massive oaken chest, created at the turn of the 16th and 17th century. On the southern wall is a mounted sandstone epitaph for Prioress Maria von Weyhe (officiating between 1591 and 1616), translated from the old church and dating from the first half of the 17th century displaying the Weyhe family coat of arms, baroque figural allegories of Faith, Hope and Charity, reliefs of the Transfiguration of Jesus and of Jesus with the five wise virgins. The altar bible, edited by Caspar Holwein and printed in 1702 in Stade, is a valuable print from the Swedish era.

There are two crypts underneath the church floor discovered in 1964 at installing a modern heating and a pertaining boiler room. The older one, located in front of the altar, is built from brick of obsolete size and buried with rubble from the demolition of the abbey in 1737. Findings of rests of women's hair portend the burial crypt of the convent's donators, the Brobergen family. Close to the western entrance the second burial crypt (called the Amtsgruft, i.e. bailiff's crypt) was found under the aisle, estimated to an age of more than 200 years. The prominent barrel vault of the bailiff's crypt is why the church floor, elevated with rubble, is now 0.9 m (3.0 ft) higher than that of the former abbey.

The six richly decorated zinc and lead coffins in the bailiff's crypt contain the remains of Bailiff Ernst Friedrich Pflueg, of his wife Margaretha Elisabeth Pfluegen, of Bailiff Johann Hermann Meyer, of his wife Anna Maria Meyer, as well of the grandchildren of Bailiff Heinrich Wilhelm Rautenberg, who died from a feaver when in 1788 they visited their grandparents in Himmelpforten. After being examined also the bailiff's crypt was buried again with sand.

Being a typical 18th-century aisleless church (Saalkirche) the 1737/1738 eye-catching typically Protestant pulpit altar by Joachim August Relling dominates the inside scene. The pulpit altar is topped by the Tetragrammaton יהוה in an auriole. Left and right the pulpit is flanked by veil-like carved elements bearing the Latin inscription «Vere hic est nihil aliud - nisi domus Dei et porta coeli» (English: Here is none other than the house of God, and the gate of Heaven.), paraphrasing verse 28:17 from the Book of Genesis and alluding to the name of Himmelpforten (English: Gate of Heaven), derived from that of the former local convent. The former abbey still had three altars, one high altar and two side altars.

In 1794, on the occasion of redistricting Hammah, Hammahermoor and Mittelsdorf into the Himmelpforten parish, galleries (lofts) were installed to seat the additional parishioners. Since the installations of the galleries, men sat above and women at grade. Traditionally women from Himmelpforten (including its components Löhe, Ochsenpohl, and Ramels) sat southerly of the middle aisle, whereas northerly those from Hammah, Hammahermoor and Mittelsdorf.

In 1798 Himmelpforten parish bought a second bell from Harsefeld. The first line of pews on the northern gallery used to be the stand of the choir boys. Close to the pulpit altar stood the individual pews for influential and wealthy families such as those of the bailiff, the preacher, the innkeeper Hancken, the post-office keeper Wehber and the great cotter von Issendorff, the first lines of pews north of the aisle were reserved for officials of the bailiwick and other clerks of church or municipality.

When in 1834 Stade's merged St. Cosmae-St. Nicolai parish sold the old St. Nicholas Church in Stade for demolition the Himmelpforten parish bought several furnishings from that church. Among them are 15 paintings of the Passion of Jesus of Nazareth, bought for Rtlr 206 and 14 good groats, created around 1620. Since 1985 they are hung on the parapet of the northern gallery beginning with the triumphal entry into Jerusalem and ending with the descent from the Cross, with each painting showing the coats of arms of the donating families from Stade's St. Nicholas parish (such as Marschalck von Bachtenbrock, Stade's then burgomaster Heinrich Hintze [1576–1646], Johann von der Medem [1580–1644]) and canting arms of craftspeople. The paintings had later been covered and forgotten and only rediscovered in 1933 on the occasion of a renovation.

In 1844 the parish acquired a church clock for the ridge turret. In 1894 the congregation installed an oven heating. Between 1982 and 1985 the church underwent a thorough renovation, removing the southern gallery in order to gain more light through the sunny side, faulty façade bricks were replaced by tailored replicas from the Netherlands, the galleries were altered and the interior walls newly rendered.

=== Organ ===
The pipe organ on the west gallery is one of the oldest and most valuable in the Stade County dating to the 16th century. It was built by Hans Scherer the Elder and Antonius Wilde for Stade's St. Nicholas' Church between 1587 and 1590. In the years 1609 and 1667 to 1669 not known organ builders repaired the instrument most likely also altering disposition and technical details. In 1677 Arp Schnitger rebuilt the organ on the occasion of a general reshape of the interior of St. Nicholas, applying a new case and adding more voices. He employed 151 pounds of lead and received a salary of Hamburg mark 200. In 1709 Schnitger's competitor Otto Diedrich Richborn repaired the organ, likely on behalf of the former.

More repairs are recorded for the years 1736, 1749/1750 (by Dietrich Christoph Gloger), 1759 (Gloger again?), 1801 (by Georg Wilhelm Wilhelmy) and 1808 (by his son Wilhelm). Gloger mentioned the organ having 33 stops. In 1834 the Himmelpforten parish bought 24 of the then 35 stops of the organ from organ builder Peter Tappe, who had acquired the pipes from Stade's St. Cosmas-St. Nicholas parish renovating and rearranging them behind new case and façade in 1835. Tappe also changed the specification. It is not recorded that there ever was an organ in Himmelpforten before the purchase of the Scherer organ.

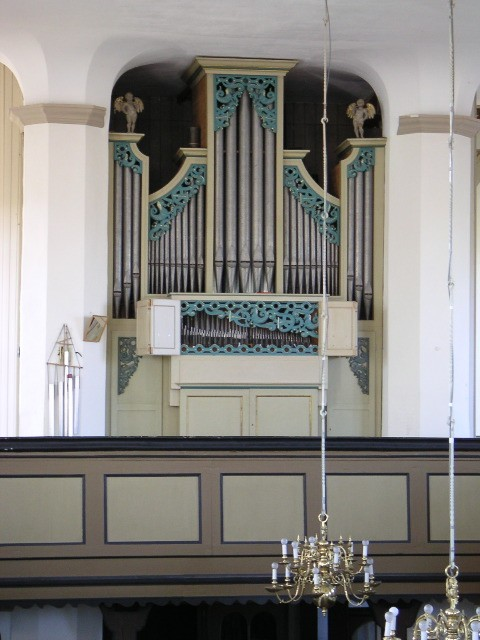
Organ in its present case.

In 1890 and 1892 Heinrich Röver repaired the organ. In 1955/1956 Paul Ott - under consultation by Alfred Hoppe - renovated Himmelpforten's organ, including many changes to case, action, pipe work and console. The new organ case follows the design of the architect Dr. Wolf from Hanover. Ott added a modern wind system to the organ, replaced the front pipes from the old case and gave the organ a new intonation. In 1973 Ott returned for a repair of the organ. During massive constructions in order to repair the roof and to enforce the stability of the ridge turret, accompanied by a general refurbish of the church interior, from 1982 to 1987, Alfred Führer completely disassembled the pipes, overhauled them in a safe place, and reassembled them afterwards.

==== Disposition of the organ ====
Today's organ comprises 24 stops and is of equal temperament. The manual ranges from CDE to c‘‘‘, whereas the pedal ranges from CDE to d'.

Hauptwerk
Quintadena	16' (mostly old pipes)
Prinzipal	8' (new)
Rohrflöte	8' (many old pipes)
Octave	4' (mostly old pipes)
Blockflöte	4' (gedeckt; old)
Nasat	2 2/3' (conic; old)
Oktave	2' (old)
Mixtur 4-6 fold	(new)
Terzimbel 3 fold	(new)
Trompete	8' (C to Gis old resonators; else new)
Vox humana	8' (new)

Brustwerk
Gedackt	8' (wood; old; F sharp and G sharp new)
Flöte	4' (wood; old; F sharp and G sharp new)
Blockflöte	2' (conic; old; F sharp and G sharp new)
Regal	8' (old; F sharp and G sharp new)
Scharff 2 fold	(new)

Pedal
Subbaß	16' (C to G sharp 7 wooden pipes, else metall pipes; new)
Oktave	8' (new)
Oktave	4' (some old pipes)
Nachthorn	1' (new)
Mixtur 5 fold	(new)
Posaune	16' (new; resonators, blocks, boots and shallots partially old)
Trompete	8' (new; resonators partially old)
Cornet	2' (new)

== Parish ==
Today's parish comprises the villages Himmelpforten (with Löhe, Ochsenpohl, Ramels, but without Breitenwisch and Kuhla, the former a part of the St. Peter's parish in Horst, the latter of the St. Martin's parish in Oldendorf), Düdenbüttel, Weißenmoor (both until 1895 part of Oldendorf parish), Hammah, Hammahermoor, and Mittelsdorf (the latter three until 1794 part of the Oldendorf parish).

Neighbouring parishes are clockwise in the Northwest St. Peter's in Horst upon Oste and St. Mary's in Großenwörden, in the North Ss. John's and Catherine's in Drochtersen, in the Northeast Assel parish and St. Nicholas in Bützfleth, in the East Ss. Cosmae et Damiani-St. Nicholas in Stade, in the Southeast Mark Church in Stade, and in the Southwest St. Martin's in Oldendorf.

Before the relocation of the nunnery to Eulsete (today's Himmelpforten) the local parishioners formed part of the St. Martin's parish in Oldendorf. Traditionally the parish was very poor, allowing only a small salary for the pastor, which is why at times the pastorate was not staffed. In reaction to Bailiff Heinrich Philip(p) Tiling's earlier criticism (a poor salary would only attract poorly skilled pastors) in 1794 the villages Hammah, Hammahermoor and Mittelsdorf were redistricted from Oldendorf parish to that of Himmelpforten, providing its parish with more parishioners and thus more revenues.

By the Peace of Westphalia in 1648 the prince-archiepiscopal elective monarchy had been secularised as the heritable Duchy of Bremen, which was jointly ruled with the new Principality of Verden, as Bremen-Verden, since both imperial fiefs were bestowed on the Swedish crown. By the 1650s the previous religious bodies, such as the Lutheran Bremen cathedral chapter or the archdeaconries, had been abolished, their revenues mostly confiscated, with only few of them not granted to Swedish war veterans. The general government of Swedish Bremen-Verden thus created new ecclesiastical structures. On 2/12 September 1651^{O.S./N.S.} the general government appointed the first general superintendent for the new General Diocese of Bremen-Verden, the Lutheran state church of Bremen-Verden, presiding over the consistory in Stade. Lutherans made up by far the majority of the population.

In 1848 the Lutheran parishes were democratised by the introduction of presbyteries (parish councils; Kirchenvorstand in Hanoverian terminology), elected by all major male parishioners and chairing each parish in co-operation with the pastor, previously being the sole chairman. This introduction of presbyteries was somewhat revolutionary in the rather hierarchically structured Lutheran church. However, the kings of Hanover remained the Supreme Governor of the Lutheran Church (summus episcopus). In the 1850s revivalism played a major role among Lutherans. Following the Hanover Catechism Strife of 1862, when the royal administration tried to impose an unwelcome old-fashioned catechism, King George V dismissed his complete cabinet.

Then Carl Lichtenberg, the new Hanoverian minister of cult and education (1862–1865), for the first time convened the long withheld church legislative assembly, called the Vorsynode (i.e. proto-synod). The proto-synod gathered synodals from all the then seven separate Lutheran state churches within the Kingdom of Hanover, thus marking the birth of today's Evangelical Lutheran State Church of Hanover. The General Diocese of Bremen-Verden thus became a subdivision of that church. The Estates Assembly of the Kingdom of Hanover (the kingdom's parliament) approved the proto-synod's decisions and cast them in the legislative mold, establishing the state synod (Landessynode, the proto-synod's successor) as the church's ordinary parliament.

After the Prussian conquest in 1866, on 19 September 1866, the day before the official Prussian annexation took place and with George V already in exile, the Kingdom's six regionally competent consistories formed a central umbrella state consistory (Landeskonsistorium). The Lutheran state church became a stronghold of Hanoverian tradition and self-confidence and therefore somewhat politicised. The relation between the Lutheran State Church of Hanover and the united Protestant monarch of Prussia was rather reserved. Thus the Hanoverian church coped better with the cessation of the summepiscopate (supreme government) by the monarchs in 1918 and the separation of state and religion in 1919.

However, also the Hanoverian church was part of the Struggle of the Churches against Nazi government intrusion into religious affairs and between Nazi-submissive clergy and church functionaries against their coreligionists upholding the unadulterated Lutheran confession. On 24 June 1933 the Prussian Nazi government appointed a State Commissioner for all the eight regional Protestant churches in Prussia and imposed an unconstitutional premature reelection of all presbyteries and synods (legislative assemblies), on all levels such as the deaneries, dioceses (for Hanover: Sprengel) and central bodies (for Hanover: Landessynode).

So on 23 July also in Himmelpforten the presbytery was reelected. In the Stade deanery proponents of the Nazi-submissive Kirchenpartei called Faith Movement of German Christians won two thirds of the seats in the deanery synod (Kreissynode) and - on the average - in the presbyteries (Kirchenvorstand in Hanoverian terminology), however, with individual presbyteries fully, mostly, partially or not at all staffed with German Christians. Lutheran Hanoverian groups opposing the German Christians founded the new nominating group called Landeskirchliche Sammlung (i.e. Regional Church Rally).

Whereas Pastor Pape of St. Peter's in Horst aligned with the Emergency Covenant of Pastors against the Nazi persecution of pastors with Jewish ancestry, and the pastor of St. Mary's in Großenwörden succeeded to convince his parishioners to elect a majority of Rally-aligned presbyters, Himmelpforten parish showed the average elective pattern in the Stade deanery. The fact that, unlike in the synod of the Stade deanery, the Regional Church Rally won the majority in the all-Hanoverian Landessynode, allowed its pre-1933 leadership, including Landesbischof August Marahrens to stay in office. However, while Marahrens opposed the adulteration of Lutheran faith within his church, he kept a low profile against the general Nazi dictatorship. In 1934 the Regional Church Rally, led by Marahrens, joined the Reich-wide Confessing Church movement.

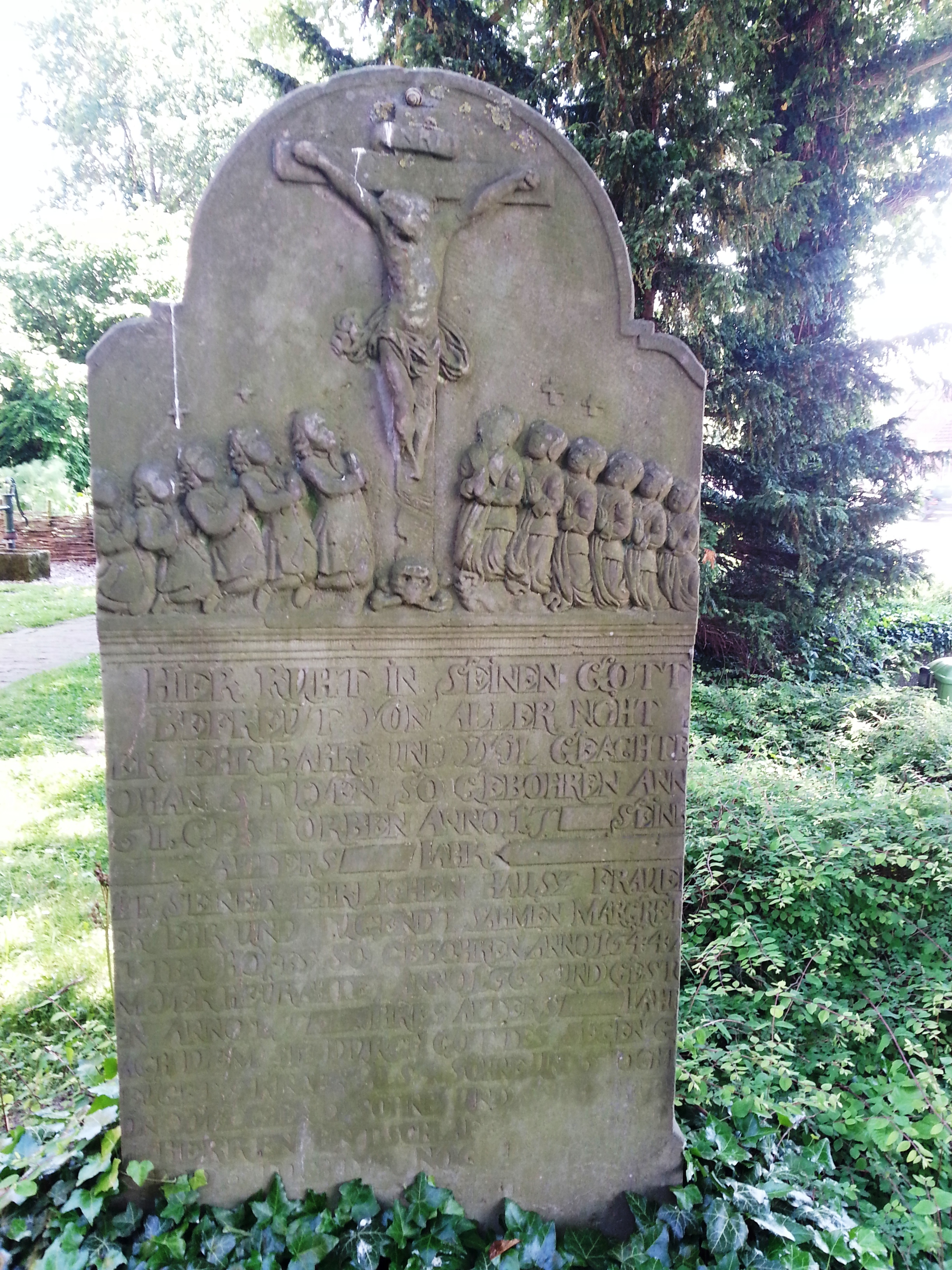
Grave of Johann Stüven on the churchyard old cemetery

Whereas 1933 twelve out of 33 Lutheran pastors in the Stade deanery had joined the German Christians, five - Gustav Mohr among them - were even Nazi party members, in 1935 two thirds of them aligned themselves with the Confessing Church. German Christians in the presbyteries had often resigned or jumped ship so that the Nazis mostly gave up capturing the church from within through compliant collaborators but intensified the control from outside by secret police, denunciators and general criminalisation. The declared German Christian Pastor Gustav Mohr was infamous for even wearing his Nazi party badge on his gown while preaching. Until early 1935 he held the second pastorate at Ss. Cosmae et Damiani in Stade, when the Confessing-Church member Hermann Ubbelohde replaced him. In 1938, after a certain furlough, Mohr became pastor at St. Mary's, succeeding Himmelpforten's retired Pastor Wilhelm Arfken. Mohr died on 16 March 1945.

== Cemeteries ==
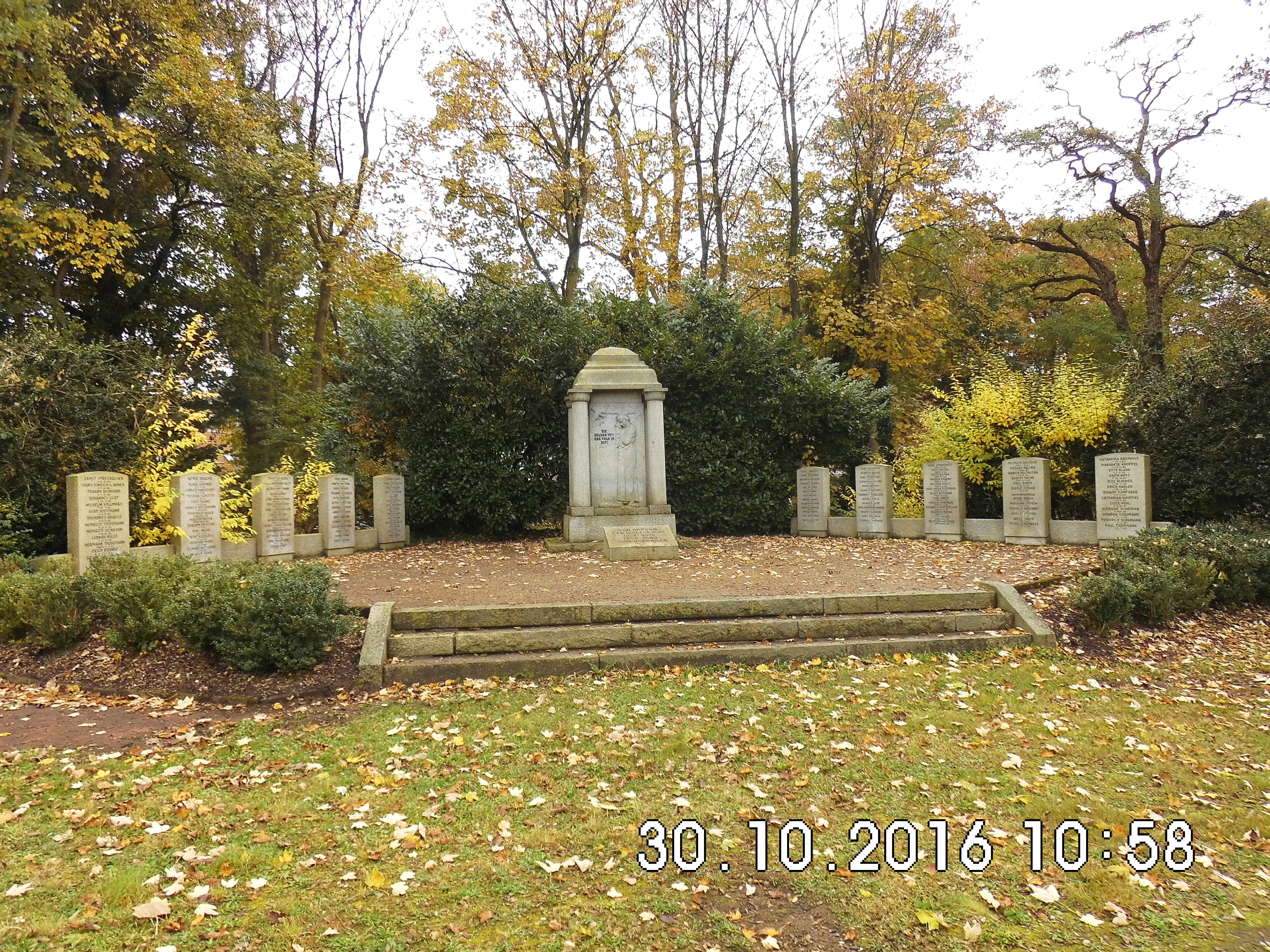
Memorial for the dead of the two World Wars on the new cemetery

The initial cemetery was a churchyard northerly and southerly adjacent to the church building, with the northerly section, the Nonnenfriedhof (i.e. nuns' cemetery), reserved for the nuns or conventuals, respectively. After the 1794 redistricting the Himmelpforten parish needed a bigger cemetery. Therefore, the old cemetery was closed in 1797/1798 and later levelled, except of few graves, such as those of Jenny von Goeben (d. 1820), spouse of Drost Carl August Diedrich von Goeben, of Hinrich Jungen and Johann Stüven, the latter two from the baroque period.

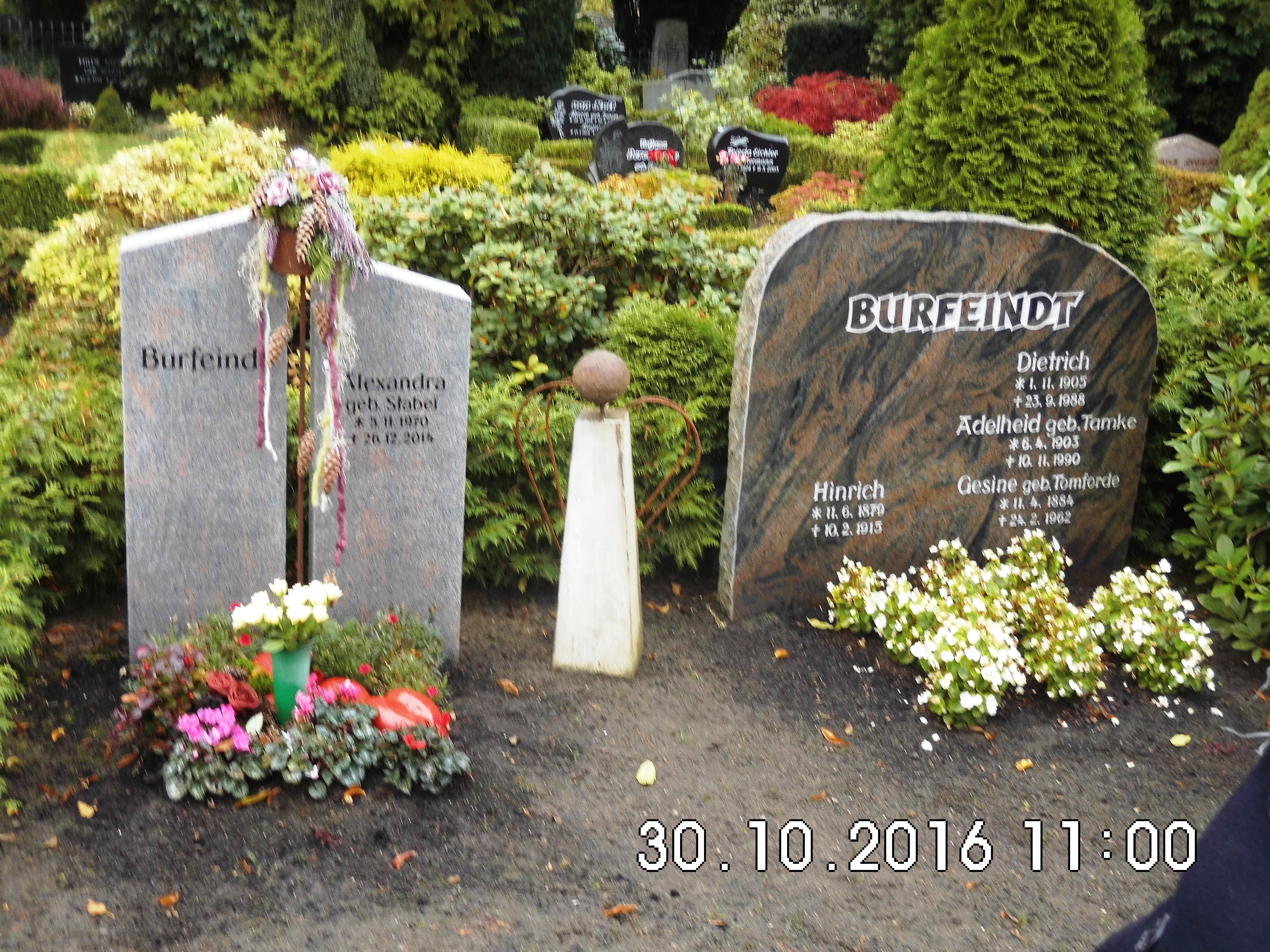
Graves in the new cemetery

A new, still functioning, cemetery was opened further east on the Main Street at the corner of Am Friedhof. The timber-framed mortuary was erected in 1839 on the new cemetery. Clergy, sextons and municipal officials are buried close to the Main Street, where there also are two war memorials for the soldiers killed in action in the Franco-German war and in the two World Wars. The section stretching northerly is divided by a central avenue, east of it residents of Himmelpforten are buried, west thereof gravesites serve the people from the other parish villages. At the northern end of the cemetery there is a section of forest, where in 1976 the architect Uwe Oellerich from Himmelpforten built the cemetery chapel on behalf of the municipality of Himmelpforten. The chapel was renovated in 2013.

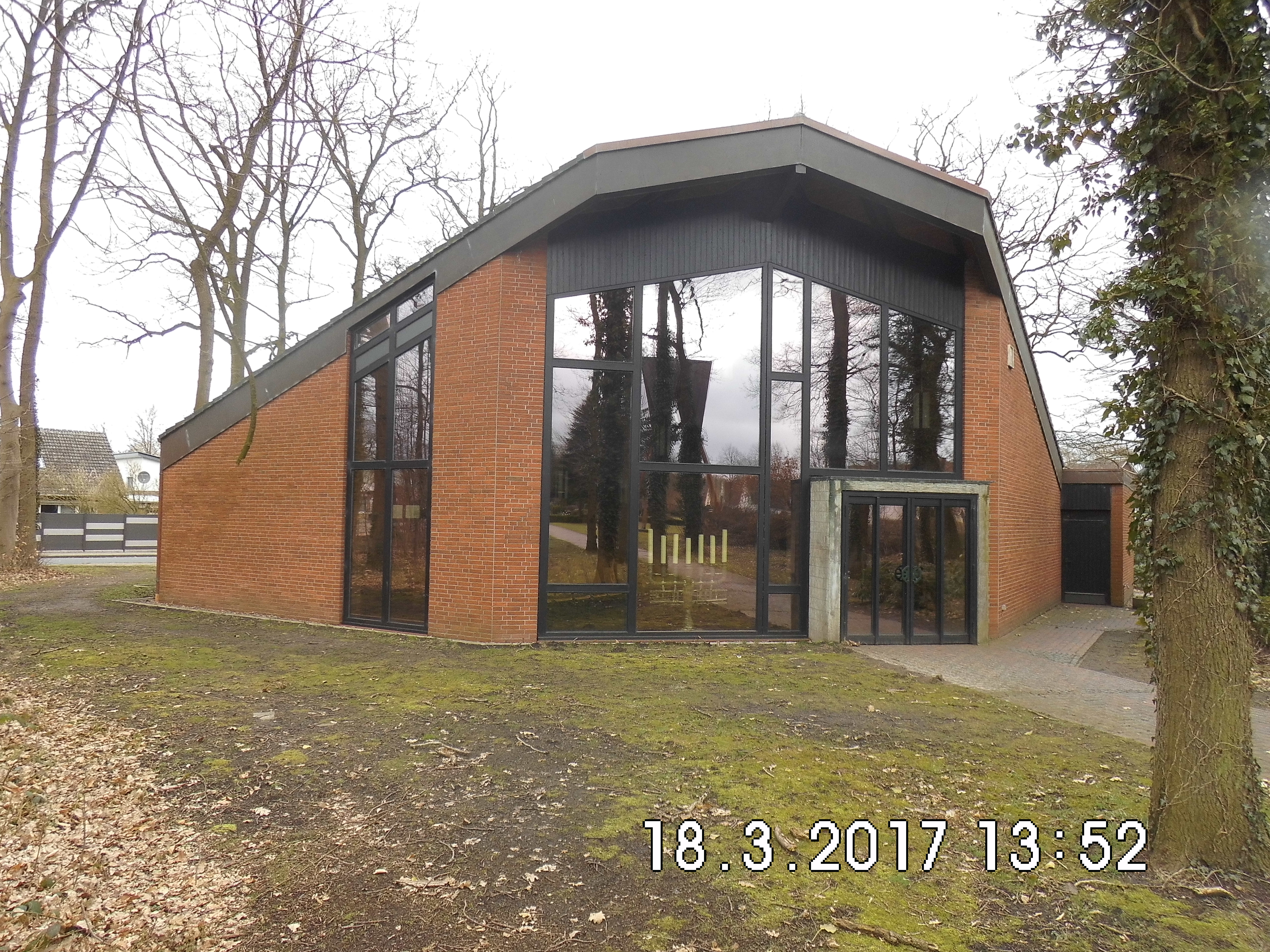
Cemetery Chapel from south, 2017

== Pastors and other clerks ==
Traditionally the pastors, like the schoolmaster and the sexton, were paid from the convent's revenues. After the alienation of the convent's revenues by secular rulers the advowson and the ius patronatus passed onto them too. The actual revenues of the pastors formed a combination of a seigniorial appanage and dues by the parishioners.

However, due to its poverty the parish was often in arrears with the salary. In 1778 Bailiff Tiling criticised that in view of the small salary only third-class preachers, who hardly passed the examination, could be employed. In 1780 the pastoral salary comprised leases from the leaseholders of glebe, Ablösen from former leaseholders, fees for peat cutting on glebe land (Torfgrabgeld), the geese fee (Gänsegeld) at St. Martin's Day, and parishioners' dues in kind (rye and eggs), certain farmers were further obliged to provide fares and hauls to and from Stade on behalf of the pastor.

Since 1788, after Tiling's criticism, pastor (preacher), schoolmaster, and sexton were salaried by the bailiwick (Amt Himmelpforten). Besides this salary the sexton received other revenues, such as dues on the occasion of Advent and Easter (shilling [s] 5 1/2 and six eggs per household in Himmelpforten proper, s 11 and twelve eggs per household in the outlying parochial villages, hay from the cemetery, 6 Himten of rye from the seigniorial granary of the Amt Himmelpforten, additional rye from the owners of certain farmsteads). Only after 1911 the positions of schoolmaster and sexton were not staffed in personal union any more.

- 1556–1562: Peter Schlichting, first Lutheran preacher, transferred to Geversdorf
- 1562–?: Hinrich Schlichting
- before 1618–1630: Ludolphus Eggebert(us) (d. in 1660), fled the imperial restitution commission to Sankt Margarethen, returned as a retired man to his daughter and son-in-law Adolph Bremer, (ad)vocate of the Himmelpforten Convent.
- ?–1629: Hermann Marsmann, fled the imperial restitution commission
- 1632–1658: Christian Kattner, first preacher after the retreat of the Jesuits
- 1658–1669: Kaspar Gottfried Schepler, studied at the Wittenberg University, took on pastorate in Hohenkirchen in Frisia
- 1669–1679: Ernst Kirchhof (d. in 1669), before field chaplain of the Swedish Guard
- 1679–1692: Joachem Henricus Schovelius (d. in 1692)
- 1692–1696: Philipp Martin Klein, studied at Wittenberg and Kiel University, started oldest preserved registries of baptisms, burials and other rites de passage, transferred to Steinkirchen in Altes Land
- 1696–1703: vacancy
- 1703–1727: Michael Schreiner (d. in 1730 in Himmelpforten) from Annaberg in Saxony, not ordained but with a permit for Sunday preaches
- 1727–1742: Eberhard Christoph Wolff from Rotenburg in Hanover, transferred to Padingbüttel
- 1742–1790: Franciscus Johannes Steller (d. in 1790) from Selsingen, studied at Helmstedt University
- 1792–1839: Georg Daniel Eichhoff (d. in 1839) from Wremen, before pastor in Oberndorf in Hadeln
- 1839–1851: Friedrich Heinrich C. Eickenrodt, elevated to superintendent and moved to Oldendorf
- 1851–1866: Heinrich Christoph Willemer from Grünendeich
- 1867–1879: Carl Justus Sattler, already as auxiliary since 1866

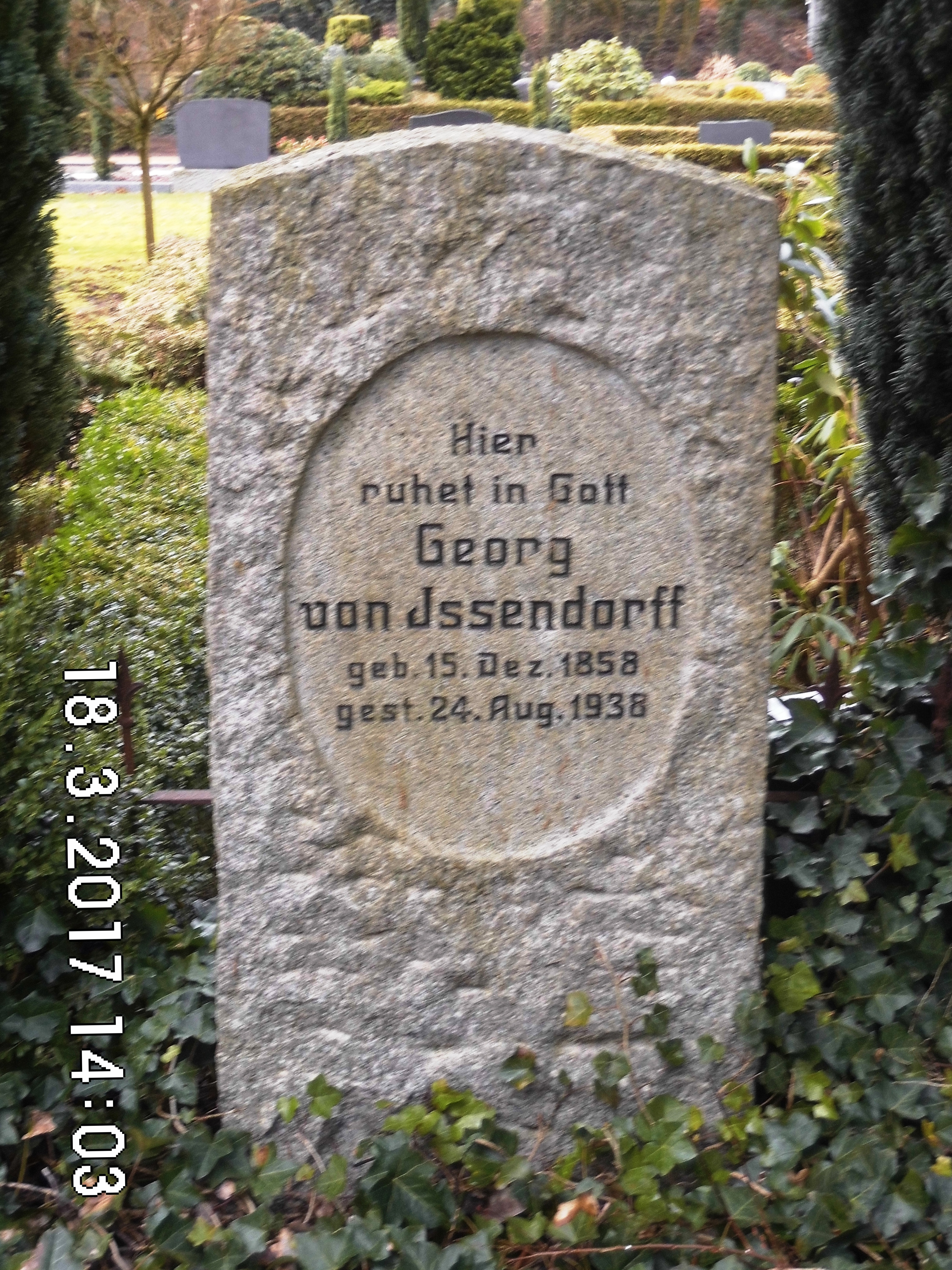
Grave of Georg von Issendorff, local chronicler

- 1880–1884: August Diedrich Ziegler from Meyenburg, later pastor in Riede
- 1885–1937: Wilhelm Theodor Arfken (d. in 1943 in Stade) from Mittelnkirchen
- 1938–1945: Gustav Elias Berthold Mohr (1880–1945), before pastor in Stade and Sievershausen
- 1946–1967: Christoph Hajo Schomerus (d. in 1979 in Stade) from Hage in East Frisia, before pastor in Einbeck and Everode, preacher at Loccum Abbey
- 1968–1978: Friedhelm Klein, later military chaplain, then pastor in Grasdorf in Hanover district
- 1978–2011: Udo Garve (pastorate II), pensioned
- 1978–2011: Reinhard Klingbeil (pastorate I), now in Uelzen
- 2011: Uwe Baumhauer (per pro)
- 2011: Ines Bauschke (per pro)
- 2011–: Rainer Klemme (pastorate I), before in Hattendorf in Schaumburg
- 2011–: Christian Plitzko (pastorate II)
