= Vincent Lübeck =

German composer and organist (1654–1740)

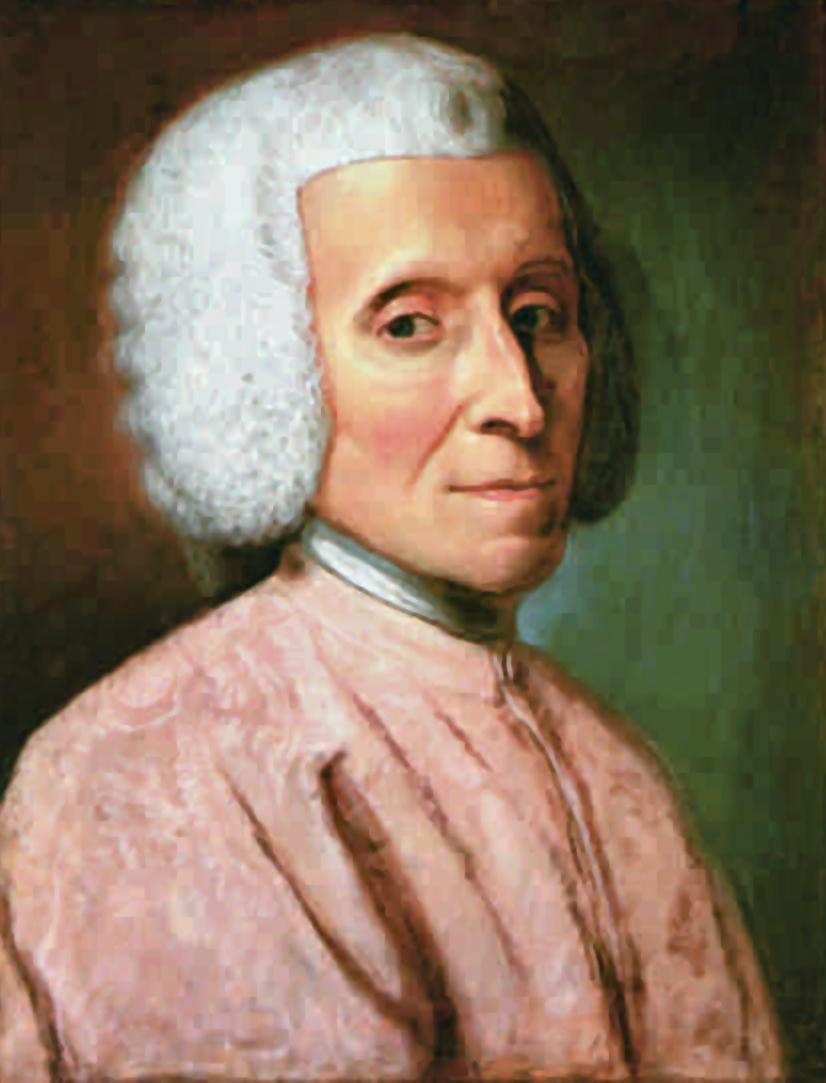
An oil painting of Lübeck, executed between 1724 and 1734.

Vincent Lübeck (c. September 1654 – 9 February 1740) was a German composer and organist. He was born in Padingbüttel and worked as organist and composer at Stade's St. Cosmae et Damiani (1675–1702) and Hamburg's famous St. Nikolai (1702–1740), where he played one of the largest contemporary organs. He enjoyed a remarkably high reputation in his lifetime, and had numerous pupils, among whom were two of his sons.

Despite Lübeck's longevity and fame, very few compositions by him survive: a handful of organ praeludia and chorales in the North German style, a few cantatas and several pieces for harpsichord, some of which were published during the composer's lifetime. Of his works, the organ pieces are the most important: influenced by Dieterich Buxtehude and Johann Adam Reincken, Lübeck composed technically and artistically sophisticated works, with frequent virtuosic passages for pedal, five-voice polyphony, and other devices rarely used by most of the composers of the period.

== Life ==
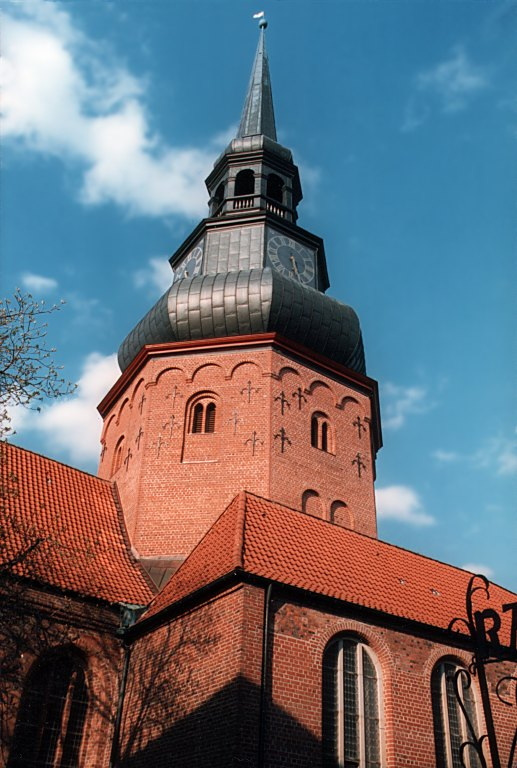
The tower of St. Cosmae, Stade, where Lübeck worked for 18 years from 1675 to 1702

Lübeck was born in Padingbüttel, a small town some 70 km north of Bremen. His father, also named Vincent, worked as organist first at Glückstadt and then, from 1647, at the Marienkirche in Flensburg, where he was succeeded in 1654 by Caspar Förckelrath. Lübeck's father died that year, and Förckelrath married the widow; it follows that he must have been young Lübeck's first teacher. According to scholar Wolfram Syré, Lübeck may have also studied under Andreas Kneller, whose influence is palpable in Lübeck's surviving keyboard works. In late 1675 Lübeck became organist of St. Cosmae et Damiani in Stade. The city had been a prominent member of the Hanseatic League, but by 1675 it was being slowly eclipsed by nearby Hamburg. Nevertheless, St. Cosmae had an organ built by the celebrated Arp Schnitger (which still survives, although it has been reconstructed). Upon accepting the post, Lübeck married, as was custom in some parts of North Germany, the daughter of his predecessor, one Susanne Becker.

The only dated works by Lübeck are two cantatas composed in Stade in November 1693, both commissioned by the Swedish administration in Stade in memory of Ulrike Eleonora of Denmark. Aside from these pieces, we know very little about the composer's activities at Stade. His reputation as organist, organ consultant and teacher grew steadily, and finally landed him the position at St. Nikolai in Hamburg in 1702; he was succeeded in Stade by his son, Peter Paul (1680–1732). Hamburg was already one of the largest cities in Germany and had a long organ tradition associated first with pupils of Jan Pieterszoon Sweelinck: Heinrich Scheidemann, Jacob Praetorius, and others. A number of other important composers worked in Hamburg in the late 17th century: among them Matthias Weckmann, who helped organize the concert life of the city, and the aforementioned Reincken, one of the most celebrated organists of his time. However, by the time of Lübeck's arrival, only Reincken was still alive, and the musical life of the city, as well as its economic position, was in a slow decline. In 1720 Johann Sebastian Bach applied for a post at the Jacobikirche, but withdrew the application after acquainting himself with the local circumstances.

Nevertheless, Lübeck's position in Hamburg was a prominent one. St. Nikolai was one of the city's most important churches, and the organ was not only another Schnitger but also one of the largest organs in the world: a four-manual instrument with 67 stops. Johann Mattheson, writing in 1721, named both the organ and the organist "extraordinary", alluding to Lübeck's apparently great fame: "But how to extol someone who is already greatly renowned? I need only give his name, Vincent Lübeck." Unfortunately, Lübeck's St. Nikolai did not survive into the 20th century: the church was destroyed during the Great Fire of 1842.

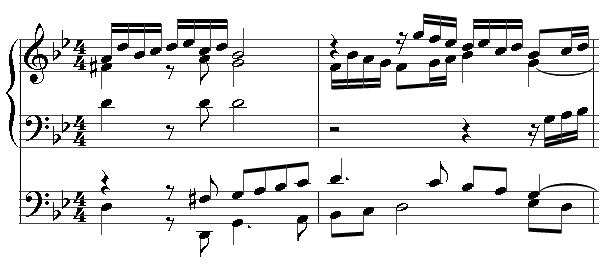
Example 1. An example of five-voice texture with double pedals from the first section of Prelude and Fugue in G minor (bars 17–18)

Lübeck remained organist of St. Nikolai until his death in 1740. One of his sons (also named Vincent, 1684–1755) assisted him from 1735 and succeeded him. During much of his career, Lübeck was a renowned teacher and organ consultant (passing judgements on, among others, Schnitger instruments). But we know little about his teaching activities; his pupils, aside from the two sons, included Michael Johann Friedrich Wiedeburg, a renowned keyboard pedagogue. Although J.S. Bach may have been influenced by Lübeck, they almost certainly never met. Lübeck's works were quickly forgotten with much of the rest of 17th and 18th century organ music. The first modern edition of the composer's work appeared in 1921 in Germany (G. Harms (Klecken, 1921)). A school in Stade was named in his honor, the Vincent Lübeck Gymnasium.

== Music ==
Prelude and Fugue in C minor (5:24)

Prelude and Fugue in E major (6:32)

Only a few pieces by Lübeck survive: five preludes and fugues (one possibly incomplete, and there is also a spurious sixth prelude and fugue), two chorale settings (one incomplete), a single harpsichord suite published in 1728, and five cantatas. Lübeck's organ works, predictably enough, show the influence of Reincken, as well as that of Buxtehude. The preludes and fugues are remarkably varied, and each has a distinct structure:

- Prelude and Fugue in C major: Toccata – Fugue 1 – Fugato manualiter – Fugue 2
- Prelude and Fugue in C minor: Toccata – Fugue (possibly incomplete)
- Prelude and Fugue in D minor: Toccata – Fugue 1 – Toccata
- Prelude and Fugue in E major: Toccata – Fugue 1 – Fugato – Fugue 2 – Toccata
- Prelude and Fugue in G minor: Toccata – Fugue 1 – Fugue 2 – Toccata – Fugue 3

Buxtehude's impact is apparent in some of Lübeck's fugue subjects, as well as the five-section structure of the E major work. The free sections often feature virtuosic pedal solos, and the G minor work includes double-pedal passages (see Example 1) of a type which is to be found several times in Reincken's output but which is absent from Buxtehude's. Most of Lübeck's fugues have an obbligato countersubject, commonly introduced during the first statement of the subject:

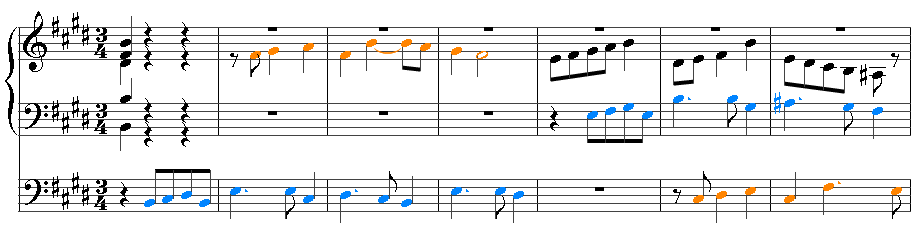
Example 2. Opening bars of the second fugue of Prelude and Fugue in E major. This is the manner in which Lübeck almost always treats countersubjects. The subject is highlighted in blue, the countersubject in orange.

The F major and G major preludes and fugues are now attributed to Lübeck's son, whose name also was Vincent. Both have a simple two-section structure (i.e., Toccata and Fugue) and show no trace of the virtuosity apparent in the fully authenticated works.

An organ fantasia on Ich ruf zu Dir, Herr Jesu Christ is the only existing complete chorale prelude definitely by Lübeck. At 271 bars, it is one of the largest known examples of the genre. There are twelve clearly defined sections, covering the entire first stanza of the chorale; numerous techniques are employed, including multiple instances of advanced hand-crossing, another feature periodically found in Reincken but not in Buxtehude. Lübeck's variations on Nun lasst uns Gott dem Herren survive incomplete, with only the first six verses set, although these are enough to indicate the composer's skill; his rich variation technique at times almost dispenses with the melody, elaborating only on the harmonic framework of the chorale.

Gott wie dein Nahme (11:46)

Hilff deinem Volck (13:32)

Lübeck's Clavier-Übung of 1728 consists of a single harpsichord suite, in which the traditional dances (allemande, courante, sarabande and gigue) are preceded by a prelude and fugue, and a chaconne, which is a simplistic two-voice piece, in which the chorale melody Lobt Gott, ihr Christen allzugleich by Nikolaus Herman is combined with an eight-bar ostinato. The suite, on the other hand, is much more advanced and exhibits some of the virtuosic qualities found in Lübeck's organ works.

Of Lübeck's surviving cantatas, Gott wie dein Nahme, Hilff deinem Volck and Willkommen süsser Bräutigam are the less important ones, probably intended for small, average ensembles. The remaining two works, commissioned by the Swedish administration in Stade, include separate instrumental movements, choruses and ritornello arias; they also feature more advanced writing.

== List of works ==
=== Organ music ===
- Prelude and Fugue in C major
- Prelude and Fugue in C minor (possibly incomplete)
- Prelude and Fugue in D minor
- Prelude and Fugue in E major
- Prelude and Fugue in F major (possibly by Lübeck's son, also named Vincent Lübeck)
- Prelude and Fugue in G major (possibly by Lübeck's son, also named Vincent Lübeck)
- Prelude and Fugue in G minor
- Chorale fantasia Ich ruf zu Dir, Herr Jesu Christ
- Chorale prelude Nun lasst uns Gott (incomplete, only the first 6 verses survive)

=== Harpsichord music ===
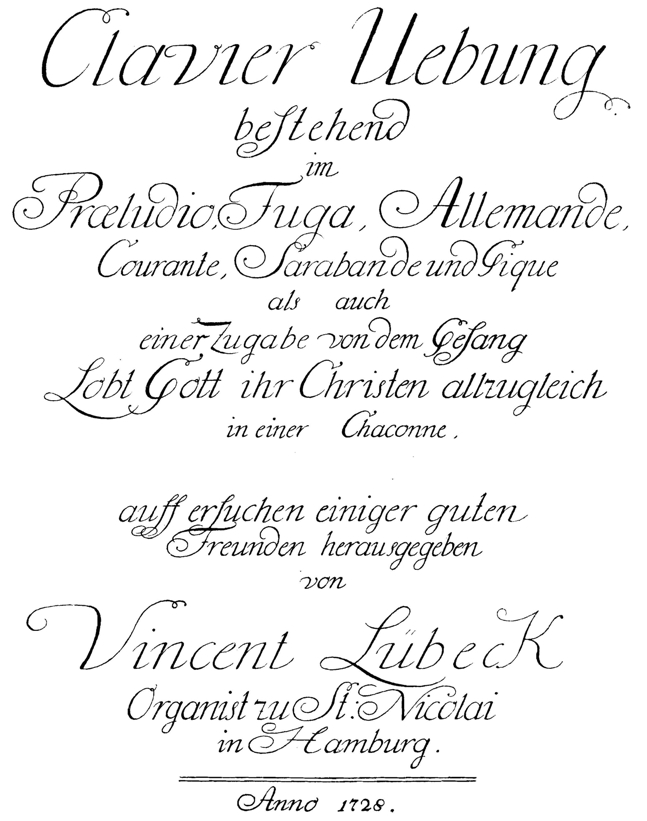
Title page of Lübeck's Clavier Übung

- Clavier Übung bestehend im Praeludio, Fuga, Allemande, Courante, Sarabande und Gigue als auch einer Zugabe von dem Gesang Lobt Gott ihr Christen allzugleich in einer Chaconne (Hamburg, 1728):
  - Prelude and Fugue in A minor
  - Suite in G minor
  - Chaconne on Lobt Gott ihr Christen, in F major
- Works from Handschrift S.M.G. 1691, attributed to Lübeck and published in the recent Bärenreiter edition of his works:
  - Praeludium (in D major) and Chaconne (in D minor)
  - Chaconne in A major
  - Suite in A minor
  - March and Menuet in F major

=== Sacred vocal music ===
- Es ist ein grosser Gewinn, wer gottselig ist (4vv, 2 vn, 2 b viol, 2 ob, bn, bc; dated 10–14 November 1693)
- Gott wie dein Nahme (3vv (ATB), 3 instruments, bc)
- Hilff deinem Volck (4vv, 2 violins, 2 b viol, bc)
- Ich hab hier wenig guter Tag (4vv, 2 vn, 2 b viol, 2 ob, bn, bc; dated 10–14 November 1693)
- Willkommen süsser Bräutigam (2vv, 2 vn, bc)
- 14 more cantatas and a Passion, known from titles and/or texts (all lost)
