= Berendt Hus =

German organ builder (c.1630–1676)

Berendt Hus (also Huß or Huss; c. 1630 – February 1676) was a pipe organ builder from what is now Germany. His organbuilding philosophy resonated with that of the early North German Baroque school, being influenced by these environments as well as that of the late Renaissance period.

Hus was the teacher and uncle of Arp Schnitger.

== Life and work ==
=== Early life ===
Hus was born around 1630 around Oldenburg in Lower Saxony (present-day northwestern Germany), which was then a county of the Holy Roman Empire. Although with certain variations, his surname is still common there today. He was raised and baptised Lutheran, practising the religion throughout his life.

=== Organbuilding career ===
The earliest record of his activity comes from 1650, when he assisted his master, Hermann Kröger, in building a two-manual instrument in Langwarden, Butjadingen. This organ has been largely preserved in its original disposition, with fourteen out of its twenty-one stops originating from master and pupil.

Shortly following the completion of the organ of the City Church of Saint Mary in Celle, where he worked in 1653 as a journeyman under Kröger on the organ's façade, Hus concluded his apprenticeship and opened his own organbuilding workshop. His first independent project was to build an organ in Diepholz, which he did from 1655 to 1656. He later moved to Glückstadt.

Hus is best known as having taught organbuilding to his nephew Arp Schnitger. Schnitger apprenticed with his uncle between 1666 and 1671 and thereafter worked for him as a journeyman (having received an unusually high salary). From 1661 through 1665, Schnitger assisted Hus in augmenting the organ of Glückstadt City Church, which the latter built, by expanding it with a third manual division (Brustwerk). Their most significant collaboration, the organ in the Church of St. Cosmas and Damian (a contract originally signed by Hus alone) in Stade, was built from 1668 through 1673.

In 1673, Hus signed what would become his final contract: a commission to build an organ for the Church of Saint Wihaldi and Stade. He died in February 1676, while this instrument was being built, in February 1676. The instrument, which would eventually be burnt in a fire in 1724, was completed by his surviving nephew Arp Schnitger (who had already completed his apprenticeship with Hus).

=== Personal life ===
In 1654, Hus married Maria Fritzschen in Oldenburg, becoming a citizen of the city. Baptisms of their four children were recorded between 1656 and 1671.

=== Legacy ===
Throughout his career, Hus built five organs of his own, and rebuilt or repaired several others.

Arp Schnitger renovated his uncle's first instrument in Langwarden from 1704 through 1705, augmenting it by revoicing the reeds, replacing parts of them, and strengthening the mixture-ranks. However, these efforts were mostly undone by reconstruction efforts by Schmid, who eliminated almost all of Schnitger's pipework, in the nineteenth century. The pipework were later restored to the state of Hus by Alfred Führer, an organbuilder from Wilhelmshaven.

== Currently known works ==
year	town	church	picture	manuals	stops	notes
1650	Langwarden	St. Laurentius		II/P	21	collaboration with his master Hermann Kröger; organ largely preserved
1653	Celle	Stadtkirche St. Marien	Foto der Orgel	III/P	35	collaboration with Hermann Kröger, especially on the façade (which has been preserved); pipes reconstructed by Rowan West (presently III/P/49)
1655–1656	Diepholz	Stadtkirche		II/P	16	first independent organbuilding project
1658–1659	Mariendrebber	St. Marien und Pankratius		II/p	17	enlarged in 1857 by Gebrüder Haupt with the addition of a pedal division (II/P/22); reconstructed 1991
1658–1660	Eckwarden	St. Lamberti		II/p		
1661–1665	Glückstadt	Stadtkirche Glückstadt		II/P	27	enlarged by Hus and Schnitger with the addition of a new division (Brustwerk) in 1674–1675; prospect preserved, now in St. Nicholas (Burg auf Fehmarn) (pictured)
1667	Jade	Trinitatiskirche		I/p	11	attribution
1668–1673	Stade	St. Cosmae et Damiani (Stade)	Foto der Orgel	III/P	42	collaboration with his nephew and apprentice Arp Schnitger; largely preserved
1673	Sandstedt	Ev.-luth. Kirche		II/P	16	organ case preserved; pipework by Gebrüder Hillebrand and Alfred Führer
1673–1676	Stade	St. Wilhadi		III/P	45	completed by Arp Schnitger; destroyed by fire in 1724
