= Heinrich Scheidemann =

German organist and composer (c. 1595 – 1663)

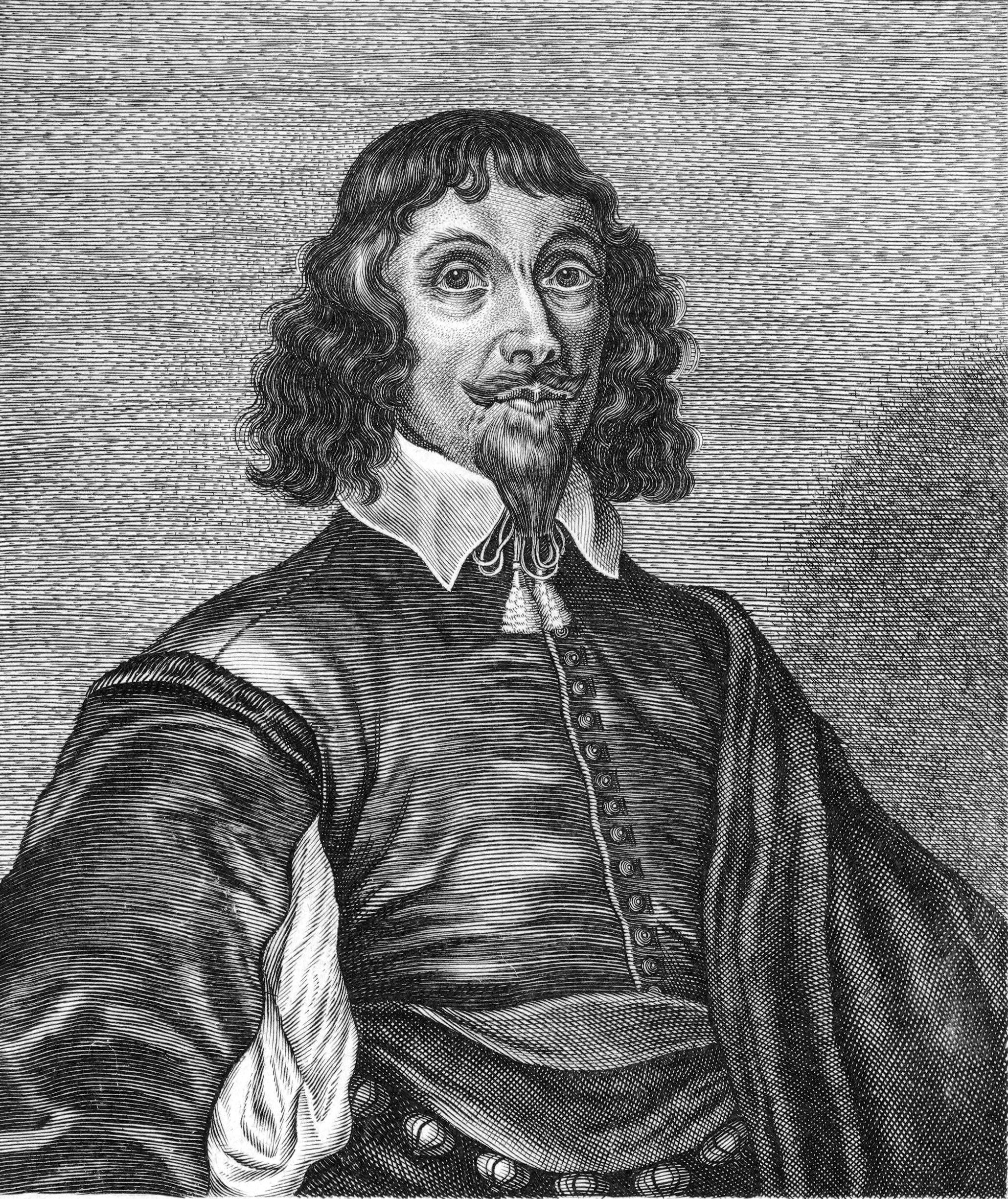
- Engraving of Scheidemann; by Johann Friedrich Fleischberger, 1652
- Born: c. 1595; Wöhrden, Holstein, Duchy of Holstein
- Died: 1663 (aged 67–68)
- Occupations: Organist; composer
- Years active: 1620s–1663
- Era: Baroque
- Style: Classical

Heinrich Scheidemann (c. 1595 – 1663) was a German organist and composer. He was the best-known composer for the organ in north Germany in the early to mid-17th century and was an important forerunner of Dieterich Buxtehude and J. S. Bach.

== Life ==
Scheidemann was born in Wöhrden in Holstein. His father was an organist in both Wöhrden and Hamburg, and he probably received some early instruction from him. Scheidemann studied with Sweelinck in Amsterdam from 1611 to 1614, and evidently was one of his favorite pupils, since Sweelinck dedicated a canon to him, prior to Scheidemann's return to Germany. By 1629, and possibly earlier, Scheidemann was in Hamburg as organist at St. Catherine's Church, Hamburg, a position which he held for more than thirty years, until his death in Hamburg in early 1663 during an outbreak of the plague.

== Music and influence ==
Preambulum No. 3 in D Minor
Performed on the Taylor & Boody organ at Marquand Chapel, Yale University

Preambulum No. 7 in D Minor
Performed on the Taylor & Boody organ at Marquand Chapel, Yale University

Preambulum No. 14 in G Minor
Performed on the Taylor & Boody organ at Marquand Chapel, Yale University

Scheidemann was renowned as an organist and composer, as evidenced by the wide distribution of his works; more organ music by Scheidemann survives than by any other composer of the time. Unlike the other early Baroque German composers, such as Praetorius, Schütz, Scheidt, and Schein, each of whom wrote in most of the current genres and styles, Scheidemann wrote almost entirely organ music. A few songs survive, as well as some harpsichord pieces, but they are dwarfed by the dozens of organ pieces, many in multiple movements.

Scheidemann's lasting contribution to the organ literature, and to Baroque music in general, was in his settings of Lutheran chorales, which were of three general types: cantus firmus chorale arrangements, which were an early type of chorale prelude; "monodic" chorale arrangements, which imitated the current style of monody—a vocal solo over basso continuo—but for solo organ; and elaborate chorale fantasias, which were a new invention, founded on the keyboard style of Sweelinck but using the full resources of the developing German Baroque organ. In addition to his chorale arrangements, he also wrote important arrangements of the Magnificat, which are not only in multiple parts but are in cyclic form towards liturgical use in alternation with the choir during the so-called Vespers, a technique in multiple-movement musical construction which was not to return with vigor until the 19th century. Among his students were Johann Adam Reincken, his successor at the St. Catharine's Church, Hamburg, and (possibly) Dieterich Buxtehude.

See: List of music students by teacher: R to S#Heinrich Scheidemann.

== Discography ==
- The Organ Works of Heinrich Scheidemann. Vol. 1. Calcante Recordings. CAL-023. 1999. 2-CD (Cleveland Johnson and Claudia Heberlein Johnson in Stade/St. Cosmae, Tangermünde, and Wellesley).
- The Organ Works of Heinrich Scheidemann. Vol. 2. Calcante Recordings. CAL-024. 1999. 2-CD (Cleveland Johnson and Claudia Heberlein Johnson in Stade/St. Cosmae, Tangermünde, and Wellesley).
- The Organ Works of Heinrich Scheidemann. Vol. 3. Calcante Recordings. CAL-025. 2003. 2-CD (Cleveland Johnson and Claudia Heberlein Johnson in Stade/St. Cosmae, Tangermünde, and Wellesley).
- The Art of Heinrich Scheidemann, William Dongois & Le Concert Brisé. Accent Records 2016. ASIN B01C9P355K.

== References and further reading ==
- Article "Heinrich Scheidemann, in The New Grove Dictionary of Music and Musicians, ed. Stanley Sadie. 20 vol. London, Macmillan Publishers Ltd., 1980. ISBN 1-56159-174-2.
- Manfred Bukofzer, Music in the Baroque Era. New York, W.W. Norton & Co., 1947. ISBN 0-393-09745-5.
- Pieter Dirksen, Heinrich Scheidemann's Keyboard Music. Its Transmission, Style and Chronology, Ashgate, Aldershot, 2007. ISBN 978-0-7546-5441-4.
