= Hendrik Speuy =

Dutch musician

Hendrik (or Henderick) Joosten (or Joostzoon) Speuy (c.1575 – 1 October 1625) was a Dutch renaissance organist and composer, and a contemporary of Jan Pieterszoon Sweelinck.

Speuy was born at Brielle. From 1595 he was organist of the Grote Kerk and Augustijnen Kerk in Dordrecht. In 1610 he composed De Psalmen Davids, a book of bicinia for the Genevan Psalter which he dedicated to the British monarch James I, and the first published work in the Netherlands for a keyboard instrument. He died in Dordrecht.
