= Ileborgh Tablature =

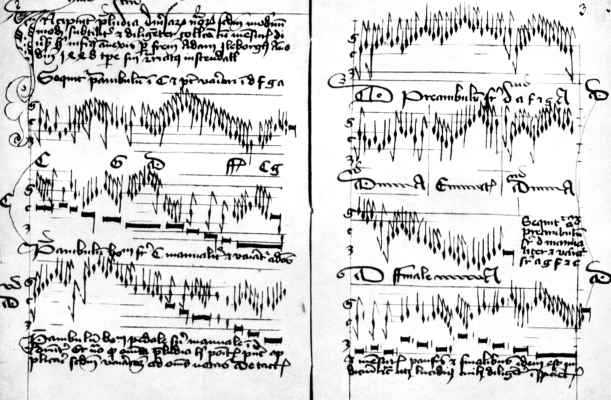
Beginning of the Ileborgh tabulature, Stendal 1448

The Ileborgh Tablature is a source of early keyboard music. It was compiled by Adam Ileborgh in 1448. Since 1981 it has been in a private collection; previously the tablature was in possession of Curtis Institute of Music in Philadelphia.

The tablature consists of seven folios 14.2 cm × 10.7 cm (5.6 in × 4.2 in) (earlier scholarship relied on incorrect measurements, 28 cm × 21 cm (11.0 in × 8.3 in) (Wolff, Grove)). The full title is Incipiunt praeludia diversarium notarum secundum modernum modum subtiliter et diligenter collecta cum mensuris diversis hic infra annexis per fratrem Adam Ileborgh Anno Domini 1448 tempore sui rectoriatus in stendall. The musical contents of the tablature are as follows:

1. Praeambulum in C et potest variari in d f g a
2. Praeambulum bonum super C manualiter et variatur ad omnes
3. Praeambulum bonum pedale seu manuale in d
4. Praeambulum super d a f et g
5. Aliud praeambulum super d manualiter et variatur super a g f et c
6. Mensura trium notarum supra tenorem Frowe al myn hoffen an dyr lyed
7. Mensura duorum notarum eiusdem tenoris
8. Mensura sex notarum eiusdem tenoris

The five preludes, here called praeambulum, are the earliest known examples of the genre (Ledbetter, Grove). There is no influence of Renaissance vocal polyphony or dance. The music consists of fast, improvisatory (i.e. lacking any strict rhythmic framework) passages in the right hand over slow moving left hand (or pedal) part. The three settings of Frowe al myn hoffen an dyr lyed ("Lady, all my hopes do lie with you") are in 3/4, 2/4 and 6/4 time, respectively. The first is a two-voice setting, the others add a countertenor (Apel 1972, 41). Scholars differ in their assessment of the importance of the tablature and the quality of its music: while Willi Apel and earlier scholarship in general regarded Ileborgh's music as highly original and the manuscript particularly important (Apel 1972, 41–43), modern scholars, such as Christoph Wolff, dispute both points and maintain that, since the music does not compare to contemporary South German sources, Ileborgh must have been an unimportant peripheral figure (Wolff, Grove). One thing is certain, though: this collection is the earliest known purely instrumental organ tablulature, not bound to vocal compositions. Although the usage of the pedal is suggested in the remarks, the tabulature does not contain a separate pedal part.
