= Janet Taylor Pickett =

American artist (born 1946)

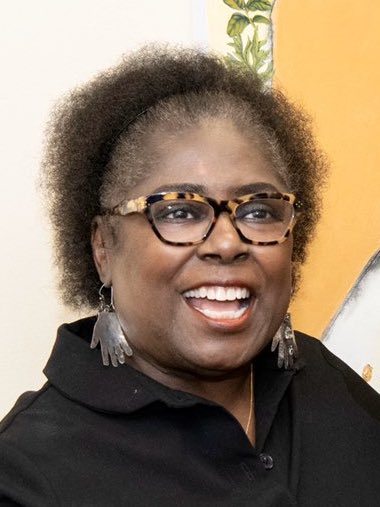
- Pickett in 2020
- Born: August 13, 1948 (age 78); Ann Arbor, Michigan, U.S.
- Education: University of Michigan
- Patrons: Kamala Harris
- Website: janettaylorpickett.com

Janet Taylor Pickett (born August 13, 1948) is an American artist. Pickett's mixed media works are inspired by her life experience as an African-American woman.

== Early life and education ==
Janet Taylor Pickett was born in 1948 in Ann Arbor, Michigan, where she earned both her bachelor's and master's degrees in fine art. She also studied art at the Vermont Studio Center, Parsons School of Design, and the Fashion Institute of Technology.

== Career ==
Taylor Pickett works in various mediums including sculpture, installation, painting, assemblage, and collage. Her work is inspired by her life as an African-American woman and informed by her 30 years teaching at Essex County College in New Jersey. In her own words, "My Blackness is a declarative statement in my work."

Taylor Pickett was one of the artists whose work was exhibited in the 1986 group show Progressions: Cultural Legacy at MoMA PS1.

Kamala Harris is a patron of Taylor Pickett's work. One of the artist's pieces was displayed in the congressional office when Harris was a senator.

== Notable exhibitions ==
=== Solo exhibitions ===
- 2021: Necessary Memories, Jennifer Baahng Gallery, New York, New York
- 2016: Janet Taylor Pickett: The Matisse Series, Montclair Art Museum, Montclair, New Jersey

=== Group shows ===
- 2020: Riffs and Relations: African American Artists and the European Modernist Tradition, The Phillips Collection, Washington, DC
- 2017: African American Women Artists and the Power of Their Gaze, David C. Driskell Center For the Study of Visual Arts and Culture of African Americans and the African Diaspora, University of Maryland, Maryland
- 1986: Progressions: A Cultural Legacy, Museum of Modern Art, New York, New York

== Collections ==
- "And She Was Born", mixed media, 2017, The Phillips Collection, Washington, D.C.
- "Hagar's Dress", print, 2007, Studio Museum in Harlem, New York, New York, the Pennsylvania Academy of the Fine Arts, Philadelphia, Pennsylvania, and the Telfair Museums, Savannah, Georgia
