= Samuel Scheidt =

German composer and organist (1587–1654)

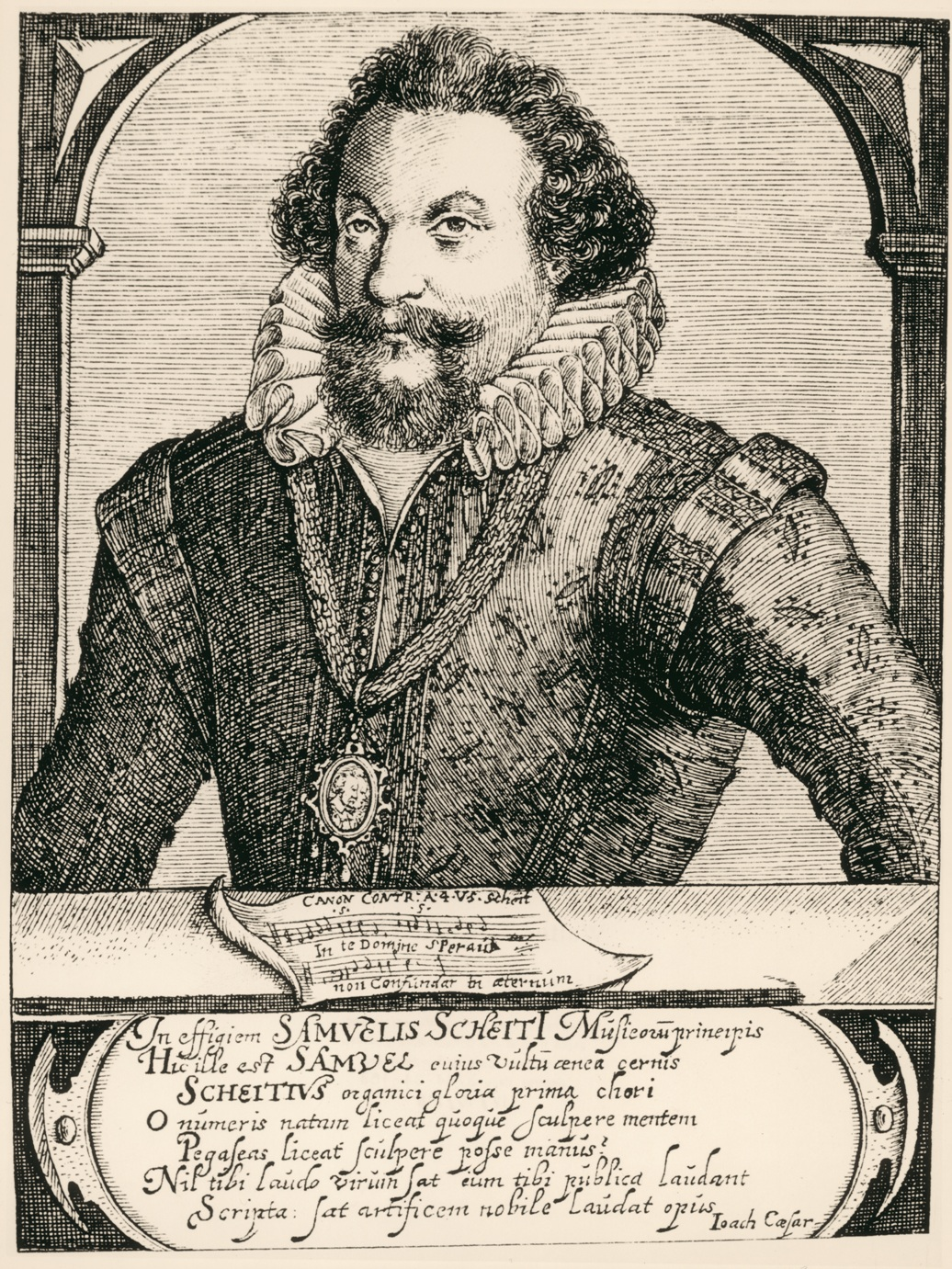
- Born: Halle, Archbishopric of Magdeburg, Holy Roman Empire
- Baptised: 3 November 1587
- Died: 24 March 1654
- Era: Baroque

Samuel Scheidt (baptized 3 November 1587 – 24 March 1654) was a German composer, organist and teacher of the early Baroque era.

== Life and career ==
Scheidt was born in Halle, and after early studies there, he went to Amsterdam to study with Sweelinck, the distinguished Dutch composer, whose work had a clear influence on Scheidt's style. On his return to Halle, Scheidt became court organist, and later Kapellmeister, to the Margrave of Brandenburg. Unlike many German musicians, for example Heinrich Schütz, he remained in Germany during the Thirty Years' War, managing to survive by teaching and by taking a succession of smaller jobs until the restoration of stability allowed him to resume his post as Kapellmeister. In 1622, he was offered but declined the post of principal organist of the Marienkirche in Danzig, which his younger brother Gottfried Scheidt afterward applied for (unsuccessfully), and which eventually went to Paul Siefert. When Samuel Scheidt lost his position with the Margrave of Brandenburg because of Wallenstein, in 1628, he was appointed the musical director of three churches in Halle, including the Market Church.

Scheidt was the first internationally significant German composer for the organ, and represents the flowering of the new north German style, which occurred largely as a result of the Protestant Reformation. In south Germany and some other countries of Europe, the spiritual and artistic influence of Rome remained strong, so most music continued to be derivative of Italian models. Cut off from Rome, musicians in the newly Protestant areas readily developed styles that were much different from those of their neighbours.

Scheidt's music is in two principal categories: instrumental music, including a large amount of keyboard music, mostly for organ; and sacred vocal music, some of which is a cappella and some of which uses a basso continuo or other instrumental accompaniment. In his numerous chorale preludes, Scheidt often used a "patterned variation" technique, in which each phrase of the chorale uses a different rhythmic motive, and each variation is more elaborate than the previous one, until the climax of the composition is reached. In addition to his chorale preludes, he wrote numerous fugues, suites of dances (which were often in a cyclic form, sharing a common ground bass) and fantasias.

== Works ==
- Scheidt's complete works are published by Breitkopf & Härtel in a series of 16 volumes edited by Gottlieb Harms, Christhard Mahrenholz and Christoph Wolff.
- A new scholarly edition of Scheidt's Tabulatura nova (1624) is edited by Harald Vogel (Breitkopf & Härtel, 1994).
- Scheidt's works are represented in many collections of chorale preludes by various authors, including:
  - The Church Organist's Golden Treasury (three volumes), edited by Carl F. Pfatteicher and Archibald T. Davison. (Theodore Presser Co., Pennsylvania)
  - 80 Chorale Preludes from the 17th and 18th Centuries, edited by Hermann Keller (Peters)
  - Chorale Preludes by Old Masters, edited by Karl Straube (Peters) (Also available in a reprint edition from Masters Music Publications)
- Free scores are available for download from:
  - Free scores by Samuel Scheidt in the Choral Public Domain Library (ChoralWiki)
  - Free scores by Samuel Scheidt at the International Music Score Library Project (IMSLP)

== See also ==
- German organ schools
