= Church of Saints Cosmas and Damian, Stade =

Ss. Cosmas and Damian Church
- St. Cosmae
- Kirche Ss. Cosmae et Damiani
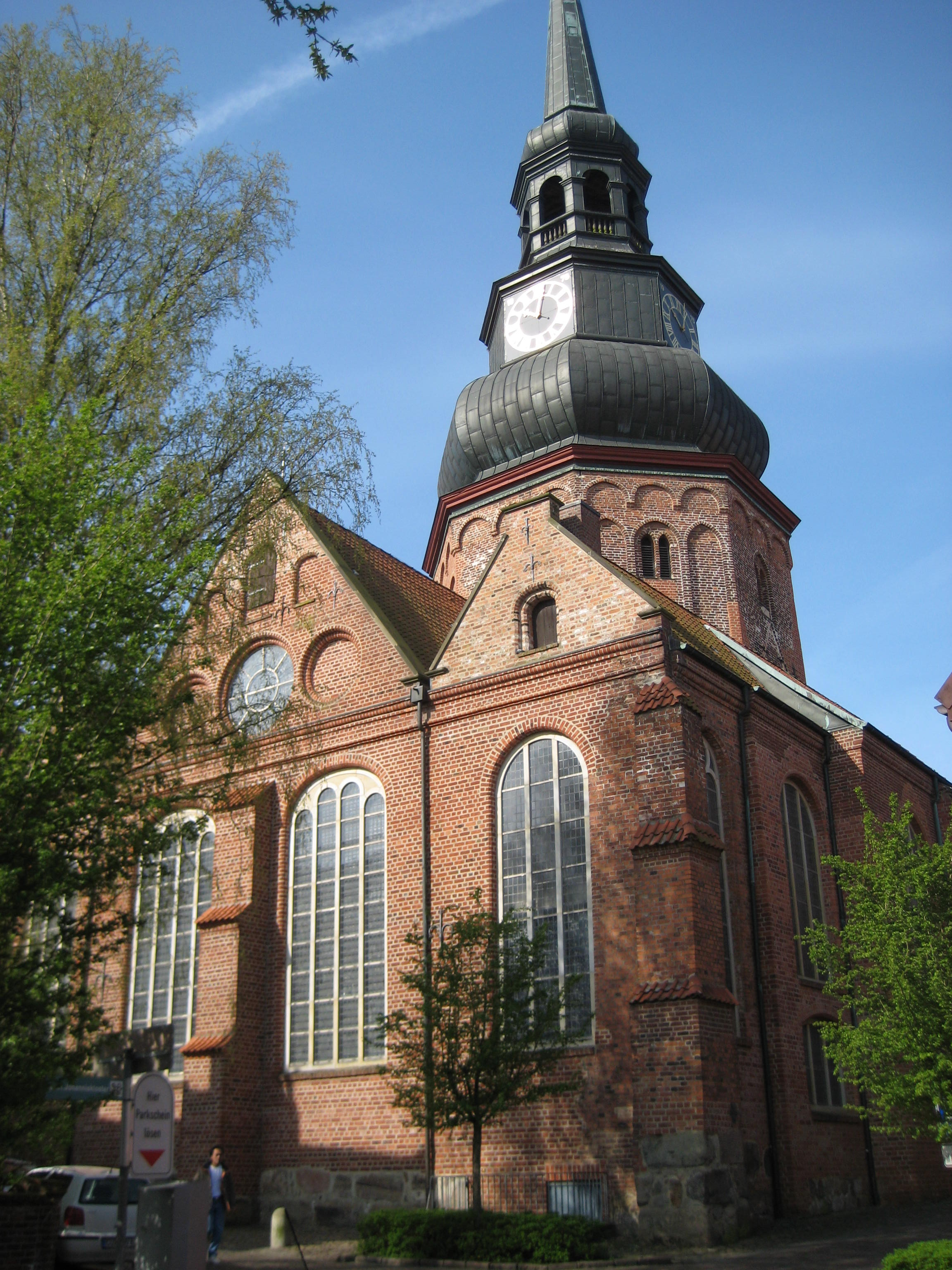
- Ss. Cosmae et Damiani, east facade

- Location within Lower Saxony Location within Germany
- 53°36′06″N 9°28′34″E
- Location: Stade
- Country: Germany
- Denomination: Lutheran
- Previous denomination: Catholic (till 1529)
- Website: St. Cosmae website (in German)

History
- Status: parish church
- Dedication: Cosmas and Damian

Architecture
- Functional status: active
- Architect: after 1659: Andreas Henne
- Architectural type: Hall church quire oriented
- Groundbreaking: 13th century
- Completed: extended in the 15th century after 1659 Great Fire reconstructed till 1684

Specifications
- Materials: brick

Administration
- Diocese: Stade diocese
- Deanery: Stade (deanery)
- Parish: St. Cosmae-St. Nicolai

The Church of Saints Cosmas and Damian, Stade (German: Ss. Cosmae et Damiani or St. Cosmae) is a Lutheran church in Stade, Germany.

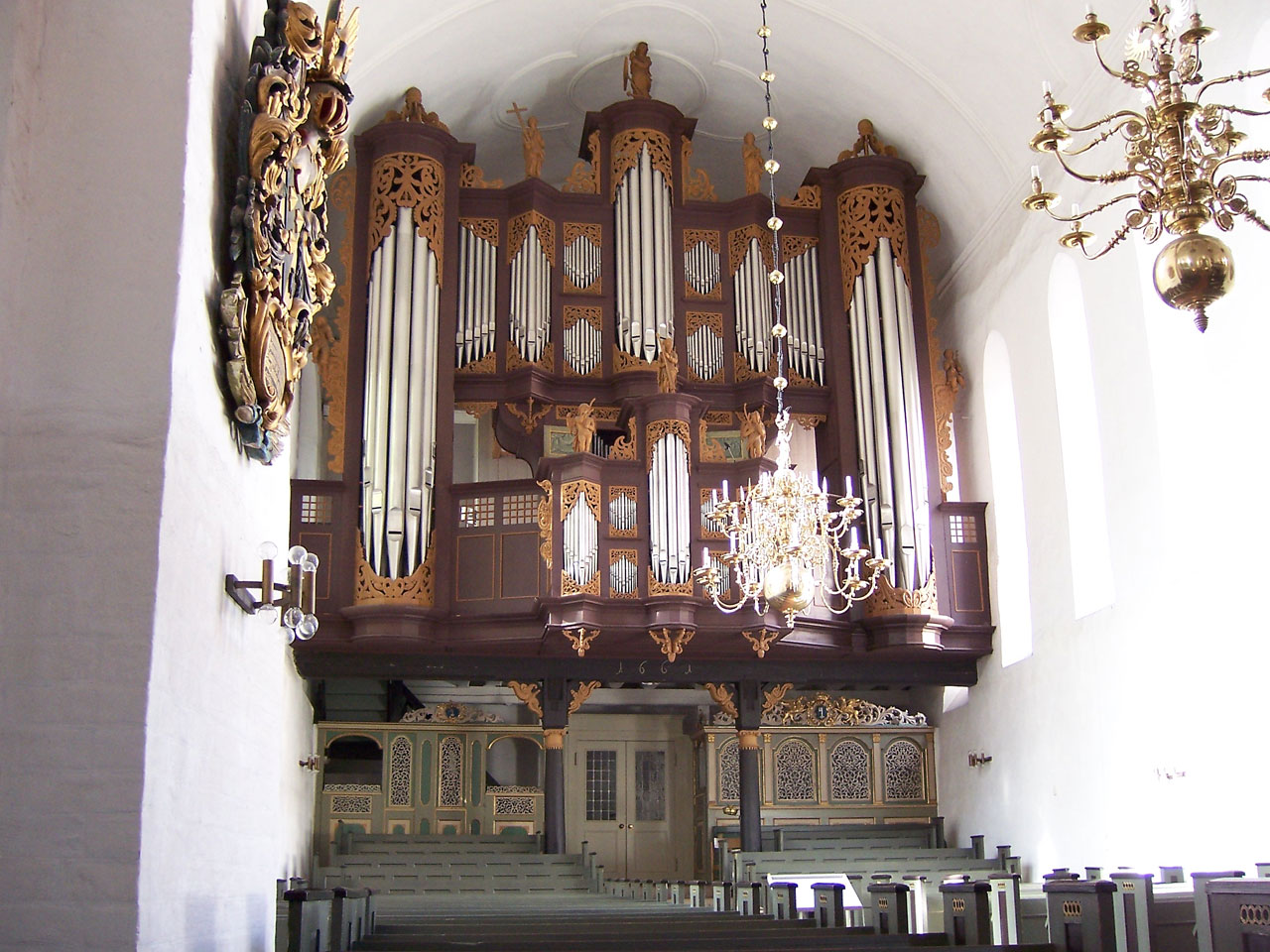
Huss-Schnitger Organ

The church was built in the early 12th century and extended in the 17th century. The Baroque altar was crafted by Christian Precht in 1674–1677, and the organ was built in 1668–1675 by Berendt Hus and his nephew, the famous Arp Schnitger; the latter expanded the organ in 1688. Vincent Lübeck served as organist of St. Cosmae between 1675 and 1702.
