= Polish organ tablatures =

Polish organ tablatures include some of the earliest and most important tablature sources of instrumental music in Europe. Particularly well-known is the Jan z Lublina tablature, which dates from mid-16th century and contains some 250 pieces. Most Polish organ tablatures use the German form of notation. The genres vary from all kinds of liturgical music to dances and vocal intabulations. This article presents a partial list of Polish organ tablatures, in chronological order.

== Medieval ==
- Augustinians' tablature from Żagań (Sagan) (ca. 1425; also known as Sagan Keyboard MS, Sagan fragment, etc.)

(Wrocław, Biblioteka Uniwersytecka I Q 438) A single leaf containing a Gloria fragment. The piece is divided into three parts: Et in terra pax, Benedictimus te, and Glorificamus te. The omission of other movements is evidence for early alternatim practice. All of the music is in two voices, the lower voice outlining the chant (Gloria ad lib.I of the Vatican Edition), the upper voice based on octave doubling of the chant tones, interspersed with ornamental figures somewhat similar to those in Codex Faenza.

- Wrocław, Biblioteka Uniwersytecka I Qu 42

This manuscript contains a hymn and "fragmentary Fundamentum"

- Wrocław, Biblioteka Uniwersytecka IF 687

Some pieces from this manuscript also appear in the Buxheim Organ Book. This manuscript also contains several clausulae.

Transcriptions of the above three sources can be found in the first volume of Corpus of Early Keyboard Music. In this volume, the library of these three manuscripts is listed as "Breslau, Staatsbibliothek".

== Renaissance ==
- Tablature by Jan z Lublina (1537–1548)

Contains a large treatise on composition, modelled on Hans Buchner's Fundamentum, but surpassing it by greater number of explanations and musical examples. The treatise is followed by some 250 pieces, covering numerous genres from liturgical pieces to dances, intabulations of motets, and a number of untitled and/or undidentifiable works.

- Kraków tablature ("Nicolaus Cracoviensis") (1548; also known as the Holy Ghost tablature. Original lost)

Contains 101 pieces, most of which are intabulations of vocal works by well-known composers. Some compositions are also found in the Lublin tablature. Unique items include several preludes, liturgical pieces, and three settings of Polish church songs.

- Łowicz tablature (also known as Martin Leopolita tablature) (ca. 1580; original lost)

Contains 75 liturgical pieces: 47 introits, 8 sequences, 12 pieces for the Mass ordinary (including a group of four, titled Missa solenne), and 8 Magnificat settings.

- Gdańsk Tablature (1591): 17 Phantasies, 1 prelude and 24 song arrangements for keyboard attributed to Cajus Schmiedtlein.
- Toruń (Thorn) tablature (by Johannes Fischer of Morąg) (1591–1604)

Contains motet intabulations and fantasias.

- Samogitian tablature from Kražiai (also known as Adam of Wągrowiec tablature) (ca. 1618)

Includes 23 pieces by Adam of Wągrowiec: fantasias, ricercares, and liturgical paraphrases.

- Oliwa tablature, the 1st (1619), another name is the Braunsberg (Braniewo) tablature.

== Baroque ==
- Pelplin tablature (1620–1680)

Contains 797 transcriptions of vocal works by various composers, and 91 keyboard compositions by Polish, Italian (Merula), German, Austrian, Netherlandish, Spanish and English (Morley, Philips) composers. Furthermore, the tablature also includes twelve organ chorales by Scheidemann, Tunder, and others, added in the 2nd half of the 17th century.

- Vilnius tablature (also known as Sapieha album) (ca. 1626)
- Ostromeczew tablature (also known as Polotsk notebook, or Polotsk tablature, or silva rerum) (ca. 1640)
- Warsaw tablature (ca. 1680) - the whole tablature was recorded by Rostislaw Wygranienko in 2006.

== References and further reading ==
=== English ===
- Apel, Willi. 1972. The History of Keyboard Music to 1700. Translated by Hans Tischler. Indiana University Press. ISBN 0-253-21141-7. Originally published as Geschichte der Orgel- und Klaviermusik bis 1700 by Bärenreiter-Verlag, Kassel.
- Caldwell, John (2001). "Sources of keyboard music to 1660.". In Sadie, Stanley; Tyrrell, John (eds.). The New Grove Dictionary of Music and Musicians (2nd ed.). London: Macmillan Publishers. ISBN 978-1-56159-239-5.
- Inski, W. M.. 1964. The Cracow Tablature (diss., Indiana University)
- Perz, Miroslaw. (2001). "Adam Wagrowicensis". In Sadie, Stanley; Tyrrell, John (eds.). The New Grove Dictionary of Music and Musicians (2nd ed.). London: Macmillan Publishers. ISBN 978-1-56159-239-5.
- White, John R.. 1963. The Tablature of Johannes of Lublin, MD, xvii (1963), pp. 137–62.

=== Polish ===
- Barbara Brzezińska. Repertuar polskich tabulatur organowych z pierwszej polowy XVI wieku (Kraków, 1987).
- Gołos, Jerzy. 1972. Polskie organy i muzyka organowa. Instytut Wydawniczy PAX.
- Morawska, Katarzyna. 1998a. Historia muzyki polskiej: Średniowiecze, Sutkowski Edition Warsaw, 1998. ISBN 83-900790-7-0
- Morawska, Katarzyna. 1998b. Historia muzyki polskiej: Renesans, Sutkowski Edition Warsaw, 1998. ISBN 83-900790-2-X
- Poźniak, P. (ed.). 2004. Album Sapieżyńskie. Sub Sole Sarmatiae, Volume 9: Wileńska tabulatura organowa z XVII wieku obrazami żywota św. Franciszka zdobiona. Musica Iagellonica, Kraków. ISBN 83-7099-133-5

=== Sources ===
- The Complete Warsaw Organ Tablature

=== Scores ===
- Gdańsk Manuscript keyboard Phantasies on IMSLP
