= Cajus =

Cajus may refer to:

- Caius of Korea (1571–1624), Roman Catholic martyr
- Cajus Schmiedtlein (c. 1555–1611), German composer and organist
- Theretra cajus, a moth of family Sphingidae
- The Latin praenomen Gaius, also spelled Cajus
