= Adam of Wągrowiec =

Polish composer and organist (died 1629)

Adam of Wągrowiec (also Adam from Wągrowiec) (Polish: Adam z Wągrowca) (died 27 August 1629) was a Polish composer and organist, as well as a Cistercian monk in the Wągrowiec cloister.

He was born in Margonin. He was famous during his life, and was invited to inspect a new organ in Gniezno cathedral on 17 March 1620. Over twenty of his compositions for organ were found in the Samogitian tablature (ca. 1618) in Lithuania. Adam was the first to use a separate third staff for the organ pedalboard notation.

All of Adam's pieces were recorded by Rostislaw Wygranienko in 2006.

== See also ==
- Polish organ tablatures
