= Nicolaus Cracoviensis =

Polish composer

Nicolaus Cracoviensis (or Mikołaj z Krakowa) was a 16th-century Polish composer.

Not much is known about his life. His name appears in the Kraków University archives as organist at the Kraków court. The biggest part of his compositions is contained in two great Polish organ tablatures: by Jan z Lublina (1537–48) and the Cracow Tablature (ca. 1548). They include his masses, motets, songs, dances and preludes. His works show Italian influence. The most known of his works is the choral work Aleć nade mną Wenus (You, Venus, above me).
