= Paul Siefert =

German composer and organist (1586–1666)

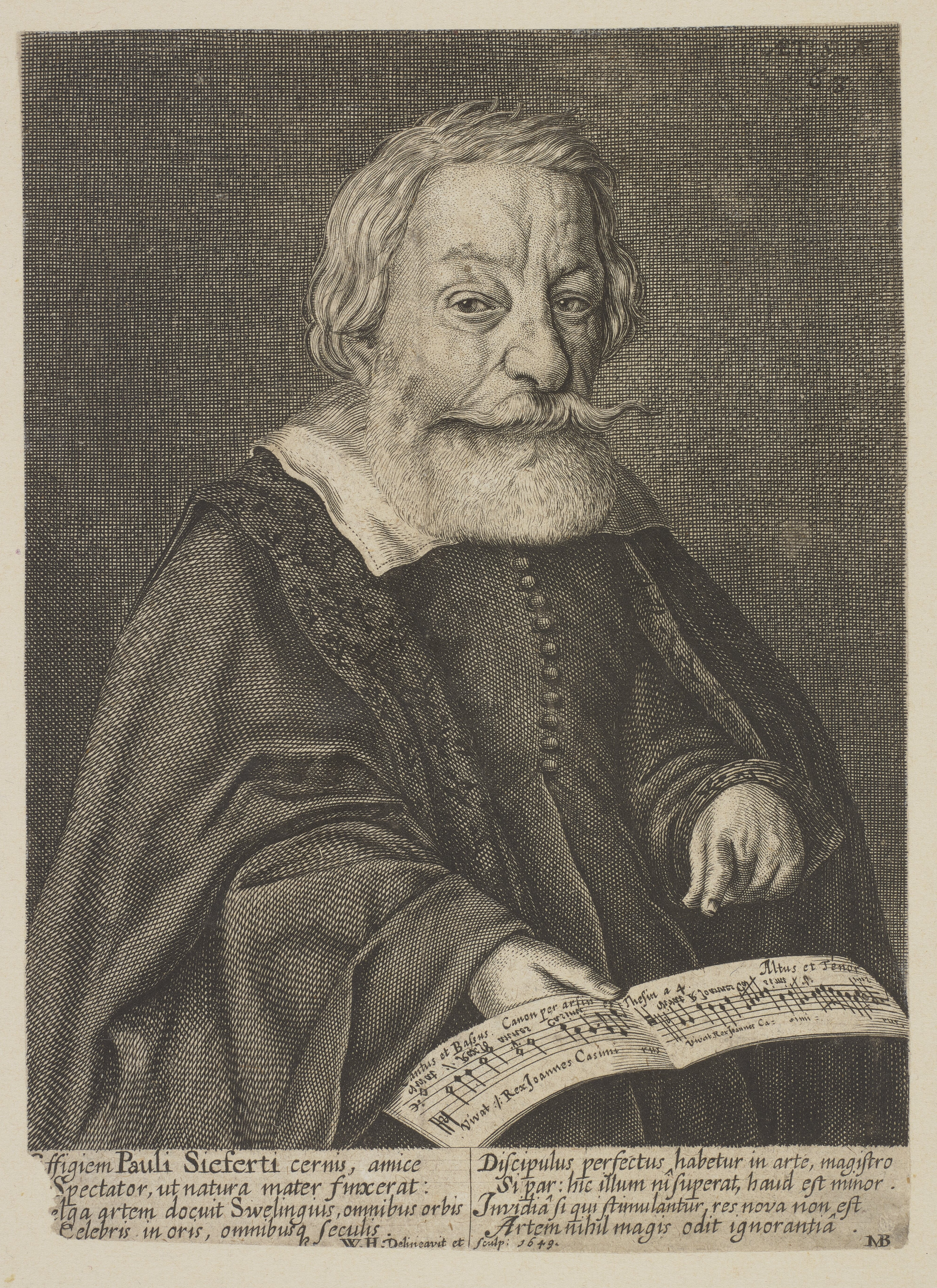
Paul Siefert

Paul Siefert (variants: Syfert, Sivert, Sibert; 23 May 1586 – 6 May 1666) was a German composer and organist associated with the North German school.

== Biography ==
He was born in Danzig (Gdańsk), Royal Prussia (a fief of the Crown of Poland) to his father's second wife and named after his father (died 1604), who was a procurator. The Danzig city council gave a scholarship to him to study with Jan Pieterszoon Sweelinck in Amsterdam from 1607 to 1610, where he studied alongside Samuel Scheidt for part of that time. Upon completion of his studies, he returned home where he became assistant organist of the Marienkirche. His application to become principal organist of the church after Cajus Schmiedtlein died in March 1611 failed due to complaints about his arrogance and style of performance.

He moved to Königsberg in 1611 to take up the post of organist of Altstadt Church, and became court organist at Warsaw in 1616. He returned to Danzig in 1623 to become principal organist, where he remained until his death; he failed in an application for the post of Kapellmeister in 1627 after the death of Andreas Hakenberger, who was succeeded by Kaspar Förster. He did not lead a serene life; he became sidelined at the Warsaw court, and had long-running feuds with Kaspar Förster, choirmaster of the Marienkirche from 1627 to 1652, and Marco Scacchi, Polish court choirmaster from 1628 to 1649.

== Music ==
His first book of Psalmen Davids consists of two concertos for three and four voices and twelve settings for four and five voices of material drawn from the Calvinist Goudimel-Lobwasser psalter of the Reformed Church. The form used is that of the chorale motet, the instrumental parts having little significance, mainly doubling the voices. Psalmorum Davidicorum II consists of fifteen psalms for four to eight voices, a concerto for four voices, and an eight-part instrumental canzona; the works are antecedents of the concertato chorale motet and the chorale cantata; there are instrumental preludes and ritornellos, and alternating sections of solo and tutti passages.

His keyboard works bear some similarity to Sweelinck. The highly ornamented line is usually played by the right hand with the chorale underneath. This texture is interrupted by episodes exploiting effects of harmony and colour.

== Surviving works ==
=== Vocal ===
- Psalmen Davids, nach französischer Melodey oder Weise in Music componieret, 3-5 part choir, instruments doubling and continuo (1640)
- Canticum seu Symbolum divi Ambrosii et Augustini Te Deum laudamus, 1-5 part choir, instruments doubling and continuo (1642)
- Psalmorum Davidicorum, ad gallicam melodiam … pars II … 4-8 part choir, instruments doubling and continuo (1651)
- Der Herr herrschen thut, motet for 5 part choir

=== Instrumental ===
- Canzona a 8, in Psalmorum (1651)
- Chorale variations, keyboard
- 13 fantasias, keyboard (doubtful)
- Paduana for keyboard
- Benedicam Dominum, fantasia for keyboard after a motet by Orlando di Lasso

=== Theoretical ===
- Anticribratio musica ad avenam Schachianam (1645)

== Sources ==
- Jerrold C. Baab, 'Siefert [Syfert, Sivert, Sibert], Paul', Grove Music Online ed. L. Macy (Accessed 2007-06-08), http://www.grovemusic.com/
- C.V. Palisca: Marco Scacchi's Defense of Modern Music (1649), in Words and Music: the Scholar's View, ed. L. Berman (Cambridge, MA, 1972)
- D. Brough: Polish 17th-Century Church Music (New York, 1989)
