= Linzer Orgeltabulatur =

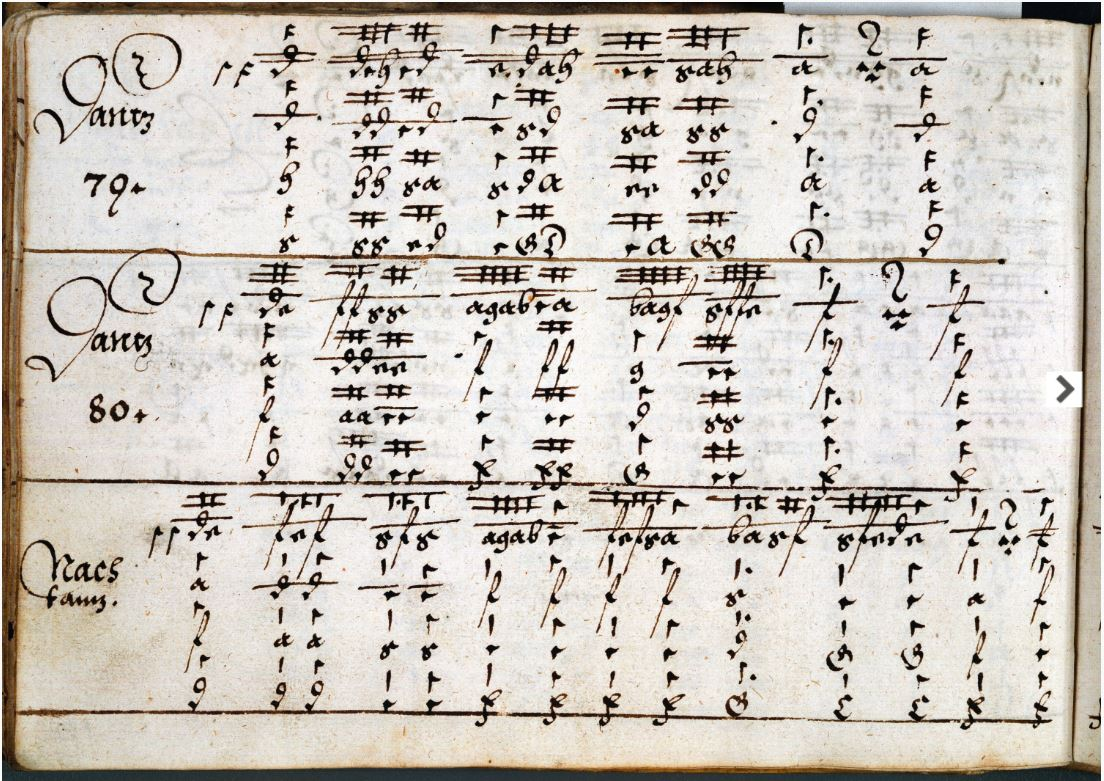
Linzer Orgeltabulatur

The Linzer Orgeltabulatur is an emblematic organ tablature of the early baroque era. Compiled in Linz, Austria, between 1611 and 1613, it is presently held by the Oberösterreichische Landesmuseum in Linz (catalogue no. 9647, MusHS. 3).

== Music ==
The music is not meant to be performed in church, but rather in a secular, domestic setting. The names of the pieces refer to folk or court dances pertaining to the national traditions of Germany (Tantz, Danz Beurlin), France (Brandle, Curanta Francesca), Italy (Paduana, Pergamasco), and England (Englischer Aufzug). Most of these dances were intended for the regal, a small reed-organ fashionable in homes during the Renaissance and early Baroque, rather than for church organs.

Cupido : piece for organ from the Linzer Orgeltabulatur (1613) played by Peter Nahon (organ of the Saint Paul Church, Bordeaux, France)

Tantz "Jesu Du zartes Lämblein", piece for organ from the Linzer Orgeltabulatur (1613) played by Peter Nahon (organ of the Saint Paul Church, Bordeaux, France)

== Title list ==
The Linzer organ tablature contains 108 titles, 43 of which were transcribed and published in 1998 (see References). The titles appearing in the printed edition are the following :

- Padoana
- Madrigale Songuesti crespicrimè guesti il
- Tantz
- Dantz Hausmanni
- Cupido
- Tantz
- Pergamasco
- Englossa
- Danntz "Zur muetter sprach das Töchterlein"
- Brandle
- Tantz
- Curanta Francesca
- Intrada
- Paduana
- Tantz
- Intrada Landgraf Boriz
- Danz Beurlin
- Intrada
- Neuer Danz
- Neuer Picklhäring
- Französisch Tannz
- Paduoan
- Auf mein Gsang
- Intrada
- Gar fest ist mir mein herz enzündt
- Tannz "Jesu Du zartes Lämblein"
- Paduana
- Tantz
- Paduana
- Galliarda
- Ach wehe dem herzen mein
- Fortuna weil unmöglich ist
- Balletta Marcury
- Neuer Tanz "Pickelhäring"
- Englischer Aufzug
- Ein festes Tänzlein
- Mein trauern ach Gott ist ohne Endt
- Curanta
- Tantz
- Ach Lieb in Laidt
- Intrada
- Mein Hertz ist in der Lieb entzündth
- Mit Seufzen und mit Klagen
- Dantz
- Es flog ein keines Waldvögelein
- Sol dann die Treue mein
- Pergamasco
