= Jan z Lublina =

16th-century Polish composer and organist

Jan z Lublina, or Joannis de Lublin, was a Polish composer and organist who lived in the first half of the 16th century. Not much is known about his life but he was a member of the Order of Canons Regular of the Lateran, circa 1540, and was possibly the organist at the convent in Kraśnik, near Lublin. Perhaps he is identical to one of the two Jans, the first of which received his master's degree in artibus et philosophia in 1499, and the second his baccalariatus in artibus in 1508 in the Kazimierz Academy in Kraków. From 1537 to 1548, he created the famous organ tablature, whose title is Tabulatura Ioannis de Lyublyn Canonic[orum] Reg[u]lariu[m] de Crasnyk. This is the largest organ tablature in the world (more than 350 compositions and a theoretical treatise) and one of the earliest. It contains several compositions by Nicolaus Cracoviensis, as well as numerous intabulations of works written by Josquin, Heinrich Finck, Janequin, Ludwig Senfl, Claudin de Sermisy, Philippe Verdelot, Johann Walter, etc.

Jan of Lublin was probably the first owner of the organ tablature manuscript now kept in the PAN Library (Academy of Sciences Library) under the signature Ms. 1716.
