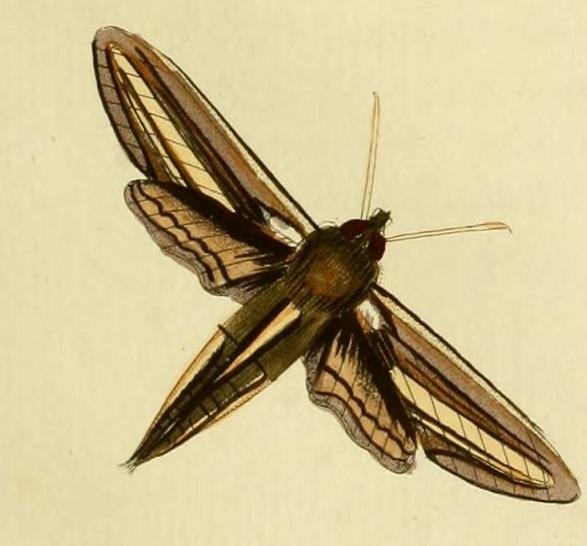

Scientific classification
- Kingdom: Animalia
- Phylum: Arthropoda
- Class: Insecta
- Order: Lepidoptera
- Family: Sphingidae
- Genus: Theretra
- Species: T. cajus

Binomial name
- Theretra cajus (Cramer, 1777)

Synonyms
- Sphinx cajus Cramer, 1777; Sphinx celaeno Esper, 1782; Sphinx gordius Stoll, 1781; Xylophanes gortys Hübner, 1819; Choerocampa epicles Boisduval, 1875

= Theretra cajus =

Species of moth

Theretra cajus is a moth of the family Sphingidae. It is known from South Africa and Zimbabwe.

The abdomen upperside has two strong white longitudinal lines, which are fused at the anterior and posterior margins of each segment, giving the appearance of a chain. The forewing upperside has a dark brown band running between the first and third postmedian lines and fifth postmedian line, contrasting very strongly with the almost white intervening band. A distinct discal line is present, with another line proximal to it but generally lost in the brown discal area. The submarginal line is distinct in most specimens and the marginal band shaded with grey.
