= Organ tablature =

Form of musical notation

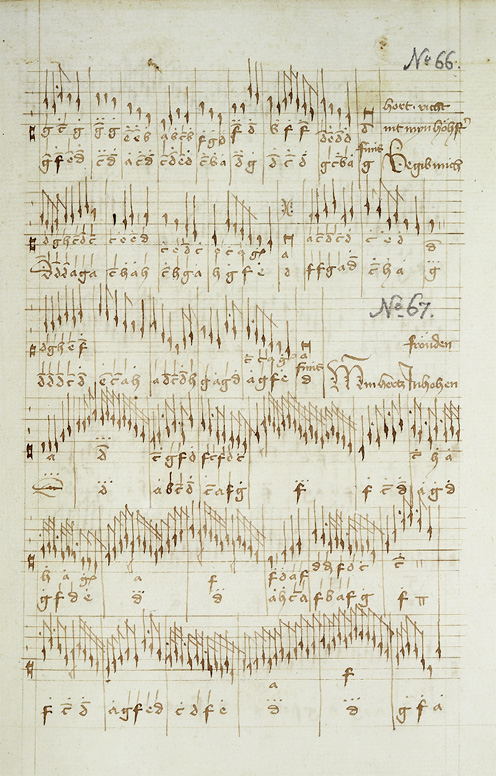
Buxheimer Orgelbuch, Cim. 352b, folio 169 recto.

Organ tablature is a form of musical notation used by the north German Baroque organ school, although there are also forms of organ tablature from other countries such as Italy, Spain, Poland, and England. Portions of Johann Sebastian Bach's Orgelbüchlein are written in tablature, as are a great deal of the surviving manuscripts of the organ works of Dieterich Buxtehude and other north German organ composers of the Baroque era.

The first extant example of keyboard tablature, which was almost certainly for organ, was in the Robertsbridge Codex, from about 1360. Although it is English, it is closely related to the later German tablatures. An early and perhaps seminal example of these organ tablatures is found in the Buxheimer Orgelbuch (Buxheim Organ Book), compiled in Münich in the 1460s. It reflects the work of Conrad Paumann, a blind organist, lutenist, and composer. The biggest organ tablature, as well as one of the oldest in the world, is Organ Tablature by Jan of Lublin (1537–48), one of ca. 20 Polish organ tablatures created from 1520 to 1700. An emblematic organ tablature of the early baroque era is the Linzer Orgeltabulatur, compiled between 1611 and 1613 and containing 108 pieces of mostly non-liturgical character.

The feature of organ tablature that distinguishes it from modern musical notation is the absence of staves, noteheads, and key signatures. Pitches are denoted by letter names written in script, durations by flags (much like modern notation), although in early notations durations were shown using mensural indications, and octave displacement by octave lines drawn above a letter. There was some variation in the notation of accidentals, but sometimes sharps were specified by the addition of a loop to the end of the letter. B natural and B flat were represented by h and b respectively. Naturals are not indicated, as accidentals do not carry through the entire measure as in modern notation. Key signatures are not specified; they are implied by the indicated sharps. In Renaissance works the uppermost melodic line is given in normal mensural notation on a staff, and the tablature given below each note.

Since the end of the Baroque era, organ tablature has not been used to an appreciable extent. Repertoire originally written in tablature has been translated into modern notation. However, this translation carries a risk of error. In German script an A and an E can become confused, as can an F and a G. Likewise, an octave line over a series of notes can begin or end ambiguously. Different solutions are given by different editors, and this is one manifestation of the improvisatory tradition of organ performance of the period.

== See also ==
Tablature
