= Cajus Schmiedtlein =

German composer and organist

Cajus Schmiedtlein (c. 1555 – 1611) was a German Renaissance composer and organist and is best known for his time as the organist at St. Mary's Church, Gdańsk. His name appears in different spelling variants in the Low German dialect (Caj Schmedeke, Key Schmedeke, Schmedecke, Smedeke, Schmedcke, Schmiedeke) and in Standard High German (Cajus Schmiedlein, Caius Schmitlein, Schmidtlein, Schmittlein).

== Biography ==
Schmiedtlein is assumed to have been born around 1555 in the Dithmarschen district of Northern Germany. For an unspecified period he was active as organist in Husum until 1578, when he became organist at Saint Olaf's Church, Helsingør. But just a year later had to resign from this post following a controversy over his own initiative to create a pedal division and thus modifying the organ without the church authority's approval. It is unclear what Schmiedtlein did following his resignation in Helsingør, but it is believed he went to Hamburg.

In 1585 Schmiedtlein became the organist at St. Mary's Church, Gdańsk.

He married in 1591 and was awarded the citizenship of the city of Gdańsk. On 2 August 1596 he was one of 54 invited organists to play at the inauguration of the new organ at the castle in Gröningen, near Halberstadt, for which he had to travel 650 km each way.

He died in Gdańsk in 1611 and was buried on 17 March 1611 under stone 111 inside St. Mary's Church.

== Organist at St. Mary's Church, Gdańsk ==
Cajus Schmiedtlein was one of the performers during the inaugural concerts (which, according to a city source, caused a sensation in almost all of Europe) on the newly finished organ (56 stops, 3 manuals + pedal keyboard) at St. Mary's Church on 18 and 19 October 1585. The event is said to have been a social gathering during which people drank wine and played dice while Schmiedtlein performed. The church authorities liked Schmiedtlein's playing and offered him the post of organist. Schmiedtlein demanded 200 Talers annually as salary and on top of that free lodgings, free firing wood and a notary position on the city council (his predecessor was paid 140 Talers and received free lodgings). It is unknown which terms were agreed to in the end, but Schmiedtlein accepted the post as organist.

He appears to have left the post for an extended period of time before being re-appointed for life by the city council in 1589. He was absent again for some time in 1590 and for six weeks in 1591 while sorting out his personal financial affairs in Hamburg. During an absence in 1594 a complaint was received about the inadequate stand-in organist Schmiedtlein arranged to deputize for him. In 1596 he traveled to Gröningen to play at the inauguration of the organ at the castle, while in 1598 he was granted extended leave to go the spa town of Baden to cure an ailment.

In 1611 the church authorities assigned the young Paul Siefert as his assistant. Shortly prior to his death, Schmiedtlein wrote a letter to the city council in which he bitterly complained about Siefert's musical skills as well as his personality. In the same letter he also refuted accusations that under his stewardship of the organ the instrument fell into a state of bad repair.

== Musical works ==
While no known or confirmed works by Schmiedtlein exist, a collection of 42 compositions in a manuscript in Gdańsk have been attributed as being likely of his authorship. The collection, known as the Gdańsk Tablature of 1591 (Polish: Tabulatura gdańska; German: Danziger Tabulatur), is part of manuscript "Ms. 300 R/Vv, 123" State Archive in Gdańsk which contains various documents pertaining to the time period between 1571 and 1627. The compositions attributed to Schmiedtlein include 17 Phantasias, one prelude and 24 keyboard arrangements of sacred and secular songs.
