= Gdańsk Tablature =

1591 musical pieces by Cajus Schmiedtlein

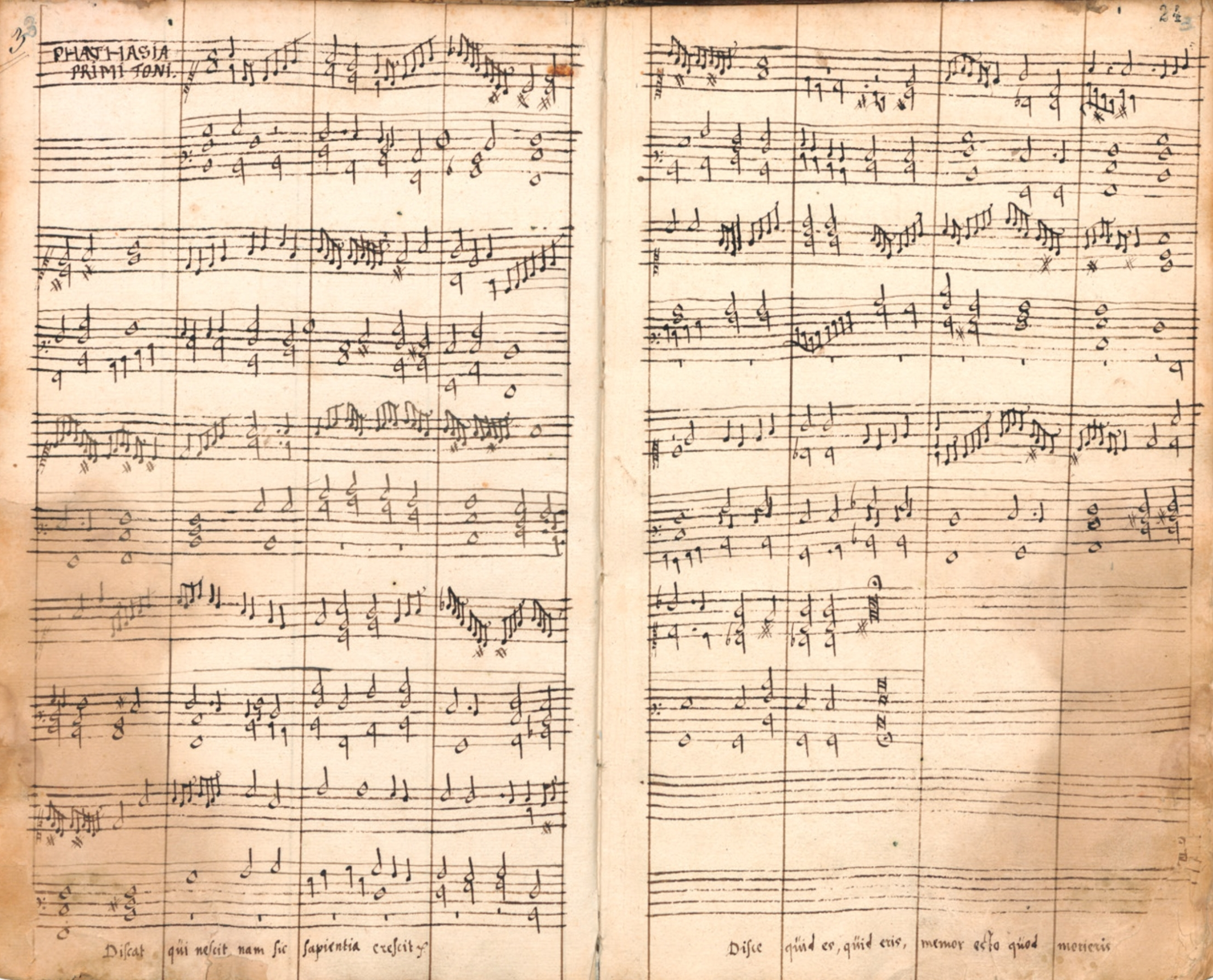
Gdańsk Organ Tablature, fols. 23v–24r, Phanthasia Primi Toni

The Gdańsk Tablature (Polish: Tabulatura Gdańska, German: Danziger Tabulatur) is the common name used to refer to the collection of 42 keyboard pieces contained within a manuscript in the State Archive in Gdańsk dating back to 1591. The music is frequently presumed to be the work of Cajus Schmiedtlein. Some of the compositions in the manuscript are based on vocal works by Pierre Regnault Sandrin, Orlando di Lasso, Baldassare Donato, Jacob Clemens non Papa, Johann Walter, Claudin de Sermisy, Thomas Crecquillon, Domenico Ferrabosco, Jean de Latre, Jacquet de Berchem, Jakob Meiland, Alexander Utendal, Giaches de Wert and Germano Pallavicino.

== The Manuscript ==
The State Archive in Gdańsk holds a miscellany of documents under catalogue reference “Ms. 300 R/Vv, 123”. The codex, consisting of 183 folia, is bound in parchment with the initials “P W S P” and the number “1 5 9 1” on the front cover. It is believed that the initials refer to the owner or scribe of the manuscript, although attempts to identify these have proved elusive. The number on the front cover is generally accepted as the year in which the sheets were bound together.

The manuscript contains blank pages, music in Intavolatura notation, music in New German Tablature notation, seven chapters stating the rights and duties of burghers, a list of City Council members for the period between 1343–1619 (including dates of death), a list of royal clerks for the period between 1457–1619, privileges granted to the Hanseatic cantorate in Lund, notes of Martin Lange (City Council secretary), and table of the City Council’s expenses (including musicians’ pay) from 1604–1605.

The music parts are written on paper bearing two distinct water marks: the older being identical to Briquet nr. 1862 and dates to 1567, while the newer mark is identical to Briquet nr. 8978 and 8979, with an ascribed manufacturing date ranging from 1588 to 1597. Assuming the paper was bound in parchment sometime in 1591, this would limit the manufacturing dates of the latter batch to range from 1587 to 1591. The manufacturing and binding dates, however, do not give any conclusive information as to time and location of writing down the music. Any part of the music in the manuscript could have been written either prior to its binding, or afterwards.

The manuscript has been catalogued on the database of the Répertoire International des Sources Musicales (RISM) with inventory number 302002314.

== The Music ==
The Gdańsk Tablature contains 42 complete compositions for a keyboard instrument. Forty of these are written in Italian Intavolatura notation, a form of score notation similar to modern music notation used in Italy and England until the early 17th century, while two pieces are written in New German Tablature. All compositions in Intavolatura notation are in the same hand writing and musical style.

The forty pieces in score notation can be broadly categorised into 17 Phantasias in 8 church modes, 19 intabulations of sacral and secular vocal music, 3 intabulations with the singing melody highlighted, and one choral setting.

The two pieces in New German Tablature consist of a vocal arrangement on a madrigal by Germano Pallavicino and an untitled prelude.

The music is assumed to be the work of Cajus Schmiedtlein, organist at St. Mary’s Church in Gdańsk from 1585 to 1611, who would have been an important figure in the city’s musical and cultural life. This attribution, however, is not certain and currently no evidence linking Schmiedtlein to the music is known.

There is further uncertainty regarding the author of the two pieces in New German Tablature. Hermann Rauschning suggested that all pieces should be considered the work of Schmiedtlein, but in his own content listing of the Gdańsk Tablature considers the two pieces to be just one. Franz Kessler on the hand considers these two pieces to be a later addition into the manuscript and suggests these should be treated separately from the other compositions based on the different hand writing and notation system. Klaus Beckmann only considers the first forty pieces when writing about the Gdańsk Tablature or about Cajus Schmiedtlein. Jerzy Erdman appears to imply in his 1993 edition that the final two pieces be considered one and publishes only one of the two pieces, but subsequently recorded both works in New German Tablature on his 1997 CD recording.

Several of compositions contain epigrams in Latin, Standard German or Greek at the bottom of the pages, which are believed to have been added by the scribe or copyist of the manuscript at the time of writing.

== List of Compositions ==
The Gdańsk Tablature contains the following pieces in sequence. Where a work is marked or known as being based on another composer’s work, the name of the composer and year of composition, where known, is provided in parentheses.

Phanthasia Primi Toni (No. 1) performed by Marek Michalak on the Hauptwerk sample set of the Silbermann Organ at the Stadtkirche in Zöblitz, Germany

Number	Title	Based on
1	Phanthasia Primi Toni	
2	Alia phanthasia primi Toni	
3	Phanthasia Secundi Toni	
4	Phanthasia Tertii Toni	
5	Alia phanthasia Toni tertii	
6	Alia Toni tertii phanthasia	
7	Phanthasia Quarti Toni	
8	Phanthasia Quinti Toni	
9	Alia Phanthasia Quinti Toni	
10	Alia Phanthasia Quinti toni	
11	Phanthasia Sexti Toni	
12	Alia phanthasia Sexti Toni	
13	Alia phanthasia sexti Toni	
14	Phanthasia Aliqua	
15	Phanthasia Septimi Toni	
16	Phanthasia Octavi Toni	
17	Phanthasia Octavi Toni	
18	Dulcis memoria et suavis recordatio	Pierre Regnault Sandrin, Doulce memoire en plaisir consommé, Paris 1538
19	Orlando a 5 / Susanne se videns rapi stupandam	Orlando di Lasso, Susanne un jour, 1560
20	Vader unse ÿm Hemmelrick	
21	Allein ahn dich Her	Baldassare Donato, Allein nach dir Herr Jesu Christ, Munich 1585
22	Godt is mÿn Licht und mÿnn Thoversicht	Jacob Clemens non Papa, God is myn licht myn salicheyt
23	Bewar mich Herr und sy nicht fern van mÿ	Anonymous, Wittenberg 1570
24	Josep lever Josep mÿnn help mÿ wege mÿn Kindelin	Johann Walter, Joseph lieber Joseph mein, Wittenberg 1551
25	Margot labourez / Orlando Dilasso	Orlando di Lasso, Margot labouréz
26	Orcombien aut Sir De[u]s dilexit mundum aut Tonii 2do	Claudin de Sermisy, O combien est malheureux le désir, 1562
27	Cessesmes Tonii 2do	Thomas Crecquillon, Cessez mes yeulx
28	Iomison aut Siginet aut Fera Basco / Egidio Lucifer	Domenico Ferrabosco, Io mi son giovinetta, Venice 1542
29	Orlando	Orlando di Lasso, Ardant amour souvent
30	Donnes secours Aut: Petit Johan de Latre	Jean de Latre, Donnés secours ma doulce amye, Löwen 1554
31	Jeprens Engre	Jacob Clemens non Papa, Je prens en gré, Louvain 1570
32	Osi potes	Jacquet de Berchem, O s'io potessi donna, Venice 1556
33	Veni in hortum meum	Orlando di Lasso, Veni in hortum meum
34	Gaudete filiae Jerusalem	Jakob Meiland, Gaudete filiae Jerusalem
35a	Pater peccavi in coelom et coram te / Clemens non Papa	Jacob Clemens non Papa, Pater peccavi in caelum
35b	2da Pars Quanti mercenarii	Jacob Clemens non Papa, Pater peccavi in caelum
36a	A 5 / Padua / Das Mädtlein	
36b	2da Pars / a 5	
37a	Hispanum ad coenam mercator belga vo caret. Regifico luxu mensa parata fuit / Alexander Utendal	Alexander Utendal, Hispanum ad coenam
37b	2da pars	Alexander Utendal, Hispanum ad coenam
38	Jaches Werth / A. 5. / Speremus meliora o[mn]es Sper. Nomie sacro dat Gabriel	Giaches de Wert, Speremus meliora omnes
39	A 6 voc / Deus in adiutoriu um meum in tende	Orlando di Lasso, Deus in adjutorium
40a	Clemens non papa / A. 6. / Deus in Adiutori um meum intende	Jacob Clemens non Papa, Deus in adjutorium
40b	2da pars / Ecce in tene bris sedeo et Lumen coeli non video	Jacob Clemens non Papa, Deus in adjutorium
41	Laura soave	Germano Pallavicino, Laura soave, Nuremberg 1589
42	[Untitled keyboard piece]	

== Editions ==
The music within Ms 300 R/Vv, 123 has been published and edited several times.

- Jerzy Golos & Adam Sutkowski, Corpus of Early Keyboard Music 1967 (Edition only features the 17 Phantasias)
- Franz Kessler, Danziger Orgelmusik des 16. bis 18. Jahrhunderts, Hänssler Verlag 1988 (Edition features pieces 1 – 40 and presents them partially with a pedal part on three staves)
- Jerzy Erdman, Gdańska Tabulatura Organowa, 1993 (Two stave edition of pieces 1 – 41; Out of print)
- Pierre Gouin & Marek Michalak, Les Éditions Outremontaises 2015 (Free edition from the source manuscript in PDF format containing the 17 Phantasias, Work on going on the remainder of the manuscript)

== Discography ==
Comprehensive recordings of the music from the Gdańsk Tablature:

- Jerzy Erdman, Tabulatura Gdańska – The Gdańsk Tablature – 1591, published by Polskie Nagrania, PNCD 391, 1997; Contains a selection of 32 pieces
- Roman Perucki, Tabulatura Gdańska – The Gdańsk Tablature (1591), published by DUX Recording Producers, DUX 0418, 2003; Contains a selection of 30 pieces

Individual pieces are included on following recordings:

- Oskar Gottlieb Blarr, Danziger Orgelmusik des 16. bis 18. Jahrhunderts, published by Harmonia Mundi in 1987, re-released as AME 3003-2 by Freiburger Musi Forum/Ars Musici in 1992; Contains 5 pieces
- Martin Rost, Die Norddeutsche Orgelkunst Vol.2 – Danzig, published by MDG, MDG MDG 319 0178-2, 2003; Contains 5 pieces
- Wolfgang Baumgratz, Orgels in Hanzesteden, published by NCRV, NCRV 9088, 1992; Contains 4 pieces
- Bogusław Grabowski, Music Treasures of Old Gdańsk – XIV-XVII, published by Futurex, FCD 0123, 1997; Contains 4 pieces
- Jan Janca, Orgellandschaft Danzig-Westpreussen, published by MDG, MDG O 1274/75 in 1987, released as MDG 319 0274-2 in 2010; Contains 3 pieces.
- Andrzej Szadejko, Rückpostiv, published Andrzej Szadejko, 2013; Contains 3 pieces
- Hans Helmut Tillmanns, Norddeutsche und Danziger Orgelmusik, published by Danacord Records, DACOCD 540, 2000; Contains 2 pieces
- Roman Perucki, Organy kosciola sw. Brygidy w Gdansku, DUX Record Producers, DUX 0219, 1996; Contains one piece
- Roman Perucki, Gdańska Muzyka Organowa – Danziger Orgelmusik, published by DUX Record Producers, DUX 0282, 1197; Contains one piece

== Bibliography ==
- Beckmann, Klaus (2005). Die Norddeutsche Schule (in German). Vol. 1. Schott Musik International. ISBN 3-7957-0531-2.
- Beckmann, Klaus (2001). Repertorium Orgelmusik 1150-2000 (in German). Vol. 1. Schott Musik International. ISBN 3-7957-0500-2.
- Erdman, Jerzy (1993). Gdańska Tabulatura Organowa - 1591 - The Gdańsk Tablature. Dawna Muzka Organowa. Polski Instytut Muzyczny. ISBN 83-900905-1-1.
- Erdman, Jerzy (1997). Tabulatura Gdańska - The Gdańsk Tablature - 1591 (CD Recording). Polskie Nagrania. PNCD 391.
- Woźniak, Jolanta; Długońska, Barbara; Popinigis, Danuta; Szlagowska, Danuta (2008). Thematic Catalogue of Manuscript in the State Archive in Gdansk. Music Collections from Gdańsk. Vol. 3. Musica Iagellonica. ISBN 978-83-7099-161-6.
- Rauschning, Hermann (1931). Geschichte der Musik und Musikpflege in Danzig. Quellen und Darstellungen zur Geschichte Westpreußens (in German). Vol. 15. Westpreußischer Geschichtsverein.
- Kessler, Hans (1988). Danziger Orgelmusik des 16. bis 18. Jahrhunderts (in German). Hänssler-Verlag. ISBN 3-7751-0440-2.
- "RISM entry for Ms. 300 R/Vv,123". Répertoire International des Sources Musicales.
- Podejko, Paweł; Przybyszewska-Jarminska, Barbara. "Gdańsk". The New Grove Dictionary of Music and Musicians. Oxford Music Online.
- Küster, Konrad (2011). "Caj Schmedeke: Ein Dithmarscher Organist des 16. Jahrhunderts zwischen Husum, Helsingør und Danzig" (in German). Uni Freiburg.
- Jones, Margaret (2011). "Well-Traveled Tunes: The Lives of Chansons in the Sixteenth Century". Nota Bene: Canadian Undergraduate Journal of Musicology. 4 (1). Youngstown State University: 29. doi:10.5206/notabene.v4i1.6565.
- Leszczyńska, Agnieszka. "The Beginnings of Musical Italianità in Gdańsk and Elbląg of the Renaissance Era" (pdf). University of Warsaw Institute of Musicology.
