= Hieronymus Andreae =

German printer and publisher (died 1556)

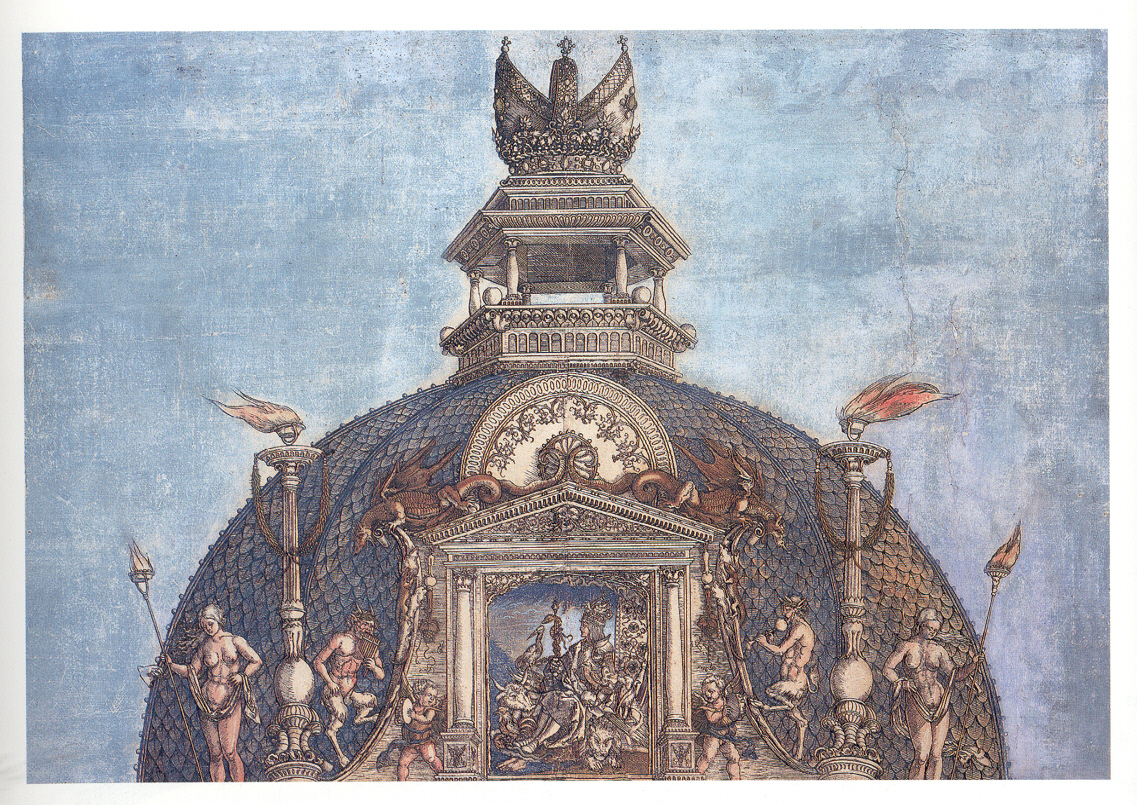
Detail of pinnacle from a hand-coloured impression of the Triumphal Arch woodcut, designed by Dürer and cut by Andreae, 1515-1517. The whole print was 2.95 metres wide and 3.57 metres high (approximately 9'8" by 11'8½"), on 192 large woodblocks.

Hieronymus Andreae, or Andreä, or Hieronymus Formschneider, (died 7 May 1556) was a German woodblock cutter ("formschneider"), printer, publisher and typographer closely associated with Albrecht Dürer. Andreae's best known achievements include the enormous, 192-block Triumphal Arch woodcut, designed by Dürer for Maximilian I, Holy Roman Emperor, and his design of the characteristic German "blackletter" Fraktur typeface ("Gothic" to most English-speakers), on which German typefaces were based for several centuries. He was also significant as a printer of music.

In the opinion of Adam von Bartsch, although Andreae never designed woodcuts (as opposed to designing typefaces), the quality of his work was such that he, along with Hans Lützelburger and Jost de Negker, should be considered an artist.

== Life and work ==
There is some evidence that he matriculated at the University of Leipzig in 1504, although this might also mean that he worked for the university rather than being a student. He became a citizen of Nuremberg in 1523, although he had probably run a workshop there for nearly a decade by then. He also cut metal dies and stamps, including those for type and coins, and the design, and perhaps production, of print type may also have constituted a large part of his business, which was commented on as being very diverse. According to the 18th-century historian Christoph Gottlieb von Murr, Emperor Maximilian regularly dropped into Andreae's workshop on his visits to Nuremberg:

....this Hieronymous resided in Breite Gasse, in this city, and his quarters extended in the rear to Frauengässlein [i.e. "Women's Alley"]. It was he who cut most of Albrecht Dürer's designs into blocks, among them Dürer's "Triumphal Chariot" [or "Car"] of His Imperial Majesty. At that time, His Majesty drove almost daily to Frauengässlein to watch his artistry, so much so that it became proverbial that "the emperor has driven once more to the "women's alley"."

He worked as blockcutter on the Triumphal Arch from 1515–17, and he and his workshop cutters would then probably have been fully occupied on that one huge commission, the quality of which has always been recognised. He also cut the Great Triumphal Car and other works by Dürer for Maximilian, but he probably appeared on the Nuremberg scene too late to produce most of Dürer's other major woodcuts, which mostly predate 1513. His Fraktur script was first developed for the large texts underneath the image of the Car, and appears in its final perfected form in his (2nd) 1538 edition of Dürer's book on geometry. It was popular and became widely adopted, becoming the most widely used typeface by Lutheran printers in northern Germany by the end of the sixteenth century. In the case of the Arch and the Car, the blocks, with Andreae's mark on them, survive in the Albertina, Vienna. Indeed, negotiations are documented from 1526 between Maximilian's heirs and Andreae, who refused to release the blocks for the Arch before being paid outstanding debts; he had meanwhile published an unauthorized partial edition himself in 1520, for which the city council had to apologise to the new Emperor, Charles V.

The cutters of most "single-leaf" woodcuts (prints) produced at the period are unknown, as they were only rarely (usually if they also acted as publisher) credited on the printed piece. If the original block has survived these may be marked or signed, and are normally so in the case of Maximilian's projects, to ensure the right cutter was paid from the large teams. In the absence of other evidence, it is not usually worthwhile to speculate on the identity of a cutter based on style or quality, so much of Andreae's work remains untraceable in the large production of Nuremberg in this period. It is for example likely that Andreae cut the famous Dürer's Rhinoceros of 1515, with a lengthy inscription, but there is no direct evidence of this. With books there is more evidence, from title-pages. He was the cutter for the many illustrations and the printer of the books that Dürer was working on in his final years before his death in 1526: on geometry - the Art of measurement (1525) - and Fortification (1527), and Human Proportions (1528, for Dürer's widow).

Dürer returned from his trip to the Netherlands in 1521 with a number of gifts for friends, including an "exceedingly large horn" for Andreae. A Dürer drawing in the British Museum (W 899) inscribed by the artist "Fronica 1525 Formschneiderin" may be of Andreae's wife (Veronica), as an old inscription on the back says. He was buried in St John's Church in Nuremberg.

== Music publishing ==
After Dürer's death he became important as a printer and publisher of music, and a designer of musical type – in this field he tends to be known as "Hieronymus Formschneider", the name used on his title-pages. He published music in a partnership lasting between 1533-1550 with the bookseller Hans Ott, their respective roles probably falling into the typical modern ones of printer and publisher. Their most ambitious production was the Novum et insigne opus musicum, a two volume anthology of one hundred motets published in 1537-1538, of which 177 examples survive, more than any other such work published before 1550.

Formschneider created a single-impression typeface for music, which he first used in 1534; in this he was only the second in Germany, being preceded by two years by Christian Egenolff of Frankfurt, who printed Petrus Tritonius's edition of Odarum Horatii concentus in 1532. There is no evidence that Formschneider was himself a musician, or that he had any deep understanding of what he was printing.

Also bearing Formschneider's imprint is the enormous Choralis Constantinus, which appeared in three volumes in 1550-55. This was the largest sixteenth century collection of Mass Proper settings, mainly by composer Heinrich Isaac, with the portion left unfinished completed on his death by his student Ludwig Senfl.

== Trouble with the law ==
He was an early sympathiser with the ideas of Martin Luther, printing his prayerbook in 1527 (but omitting Luther's name, perhaps out of discretion for buyers in Catholic territories), and was then jailed briefly for sympathy with, and perhaps some involvement in, the German Peasants' War in 1525. Described by Peter Parshall as "an opportunist of ... ambition and occasional unscrupulousness", he was often in trouble with the authorities. After Dürer's death he was accused, with Sebald Beham, of producing a plagiarized edition of the book on the proportions of the horse that Dürer never completed (a work very popular with generations of artists). In 1542 he fled the city to avoid two weeks in jail for failing to appear in court on a charge of slandering a member of the Council of the city, though he later returned.
