= Virgo Prudentissima (Heinrich Isaac) =

Six-voice motet dedicated to the Virgin Mary

Virgo prudentissima
- Renaissance music
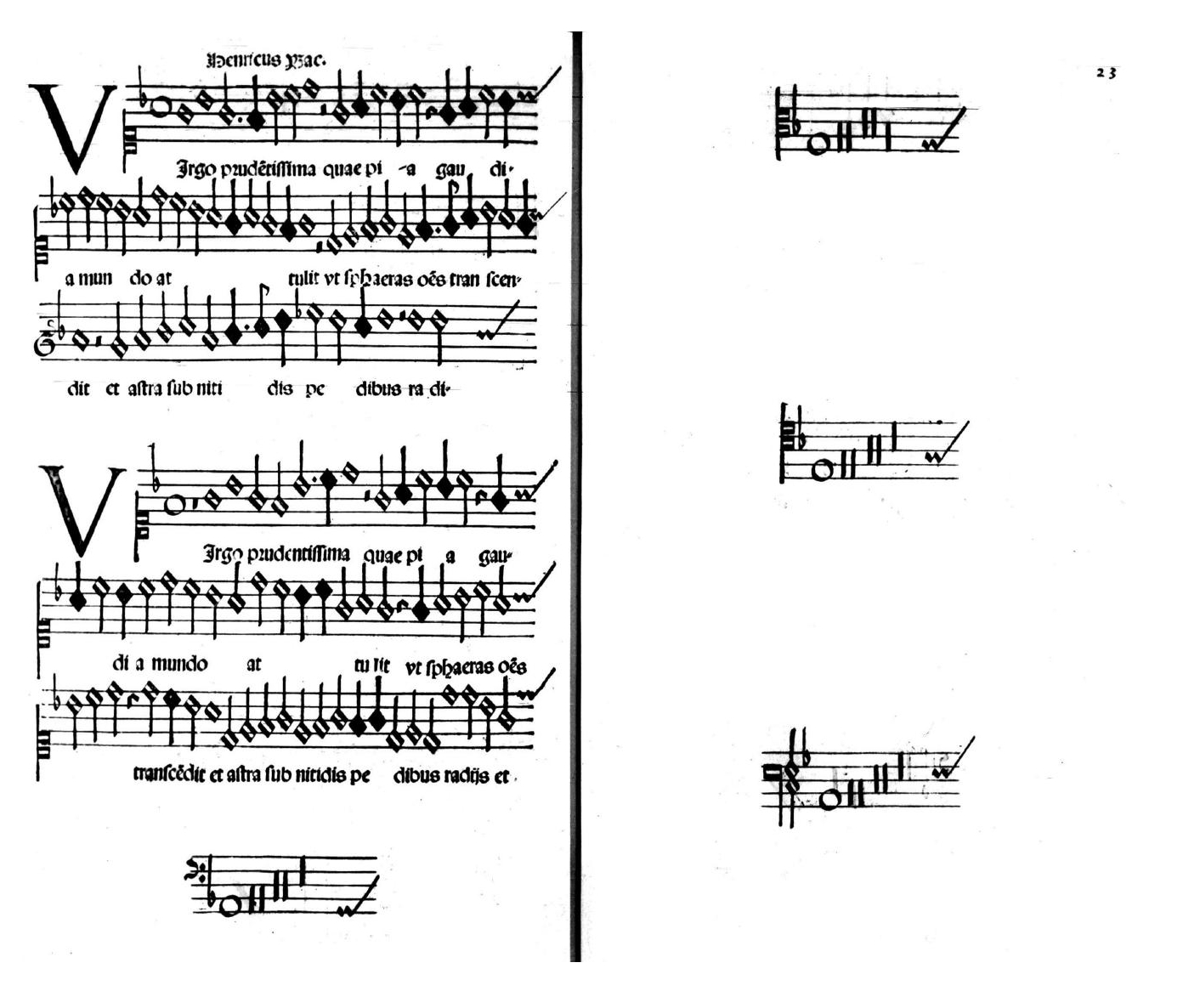
- Beginning of Virgo prudentissima
- English: "Most prudent Virgin"
- Genre: Religious music, motet
- Text: Liber selectarum cantionum (1520)
- Language: Latin
- Composed: 1507

Virgo prudentissima is a six-voice motet (SSAATB), dedicated to the Virgin Mary and composed by Heinrich Isaac in 1507. The motet describes the Assumption of Mary, calling on her and the nine orders of angels to protect Emperor Maximilian I and the Holy Roman Empire. The lyricist was Georg von Slatkonia.

== History ==
The motet was composed by Isaac in 1507 while he was in Constance for the imperial Reichstag of that year, which was organized to prepare for the coronation (which would happen in 1508 in Trento) of Maximilian I as Holy Roman Emperor. According to Franz Körndle, the motet was performed at the memorial services for Philip the Fair, son of Maximilian, some weeks after the Diet in Constance.

The motet was first published in 1520 in Ludwig Senfl's Liber selectarum cantionum. Later, around 1537–1538, Virgo prudentissima was rewritten by Hans Ott to be rededicated to Christ as Christus filius Dei (all Marian references were replaced) and Maximilian was replaced with his grandson Charles V, then the reigning emperor.

The lyrics are based on the antiphon that also serves as the model for Virgo prudentissa's closely related mass Missa Virgo prudentissima. Both were published in the Choralis Constantinus long after the deaths of Isaac and his pupil Senfl, together with the masses proper Isaac cultivated for Maximilian. Rothenberg opines that they are works, which remain incomplete, produced under the direction of Maximilian's “imperial ideology” and “bold artistic vision”.

== Structure ==
Having Guillaume Du Fay's Ave regina caelorum (1464) as the precedent, the motet is composed of two sections with a single cursus of the tenor. Influence might also have come from five-voice motets composed by Jehan le Roy, or Johannes Regis (circa 1425–1496). Planchart notes, "Unlike Josquin in his Benedicta es caelorum regina, which involved an elaborate scaffolding of polyphonic textures and a canonic cantus firmus between the cantus and the tenor accompanied by four elaborately figural voices, Isaac aims for a sharp contrast, particularly in the prima pars between the rhythmically elaborate duets and the full six-voice sections. These full sections evoke the massive sonorities of his German Mass Ordinaries set in alternation with plainsong or organ. To achieve such effects, he sets the cantus firmus largely in perfect breves, following a German tradition observable, for example, in the prose settings of Trent 91. Further, in the passages for six voices, particularly in the prima pars, the bassus 2, which is quite active rhythmically in the duets, also shifts largely to motion in perfect breves".

== Lyrics ==
The antiphon of the motet reads:

Virgo prudentissima, quo
progrederis quasi aurora valde
rutilans? Filia Syon tota formosa
et suavis es, pulchra ut luna
electa ut sol.

Most prudent Virgin, where are you
going glowing brightly as the dawn?
Daughter of Zion, you are wholly fair
and sweet, beautiful as the moon,
excellent as the sun.

The Latin text, as written by Zlatkonia, expanding on the antiphon, is as the following:

Prima pars
Virgo prudentissima, quae pia gaudia mundo
Attulit et sphaeras omnes transcendit et astra
Sub nitidis pedibus radiis et luce chorusca
Liquit et ordinibus iam circumsaepta novenis
Ter tribus atque ierarchiis excepta supremi
Ante Dei faciem steterat patrona reorum.
Dicite, qui colitis splendentia columina Olympi,
Spirituum proceres, Archangeli et Angeli et almae
Virtutesque throni, vos principum et agmina sancta,
Vosque potestates et tu dominatio coeli,
Flammantes Cherubin verbo Seraphinque creati,
An vos laetitiae tantus perfuderit umquam
Sensus ut aeterni matrem vidisse tonantis
Consessum, coelo terraque marique potentem
Reginam, cuius numen modo spiritus omnis
Et genus humanum merito veneratur, adorat?
Secunda pars
Vos, Michael, Gabriel, Raphael, testamur, ad aures
Illius ut castas fundetis vota precesque
Pro sacro Imperio, pro Caesare Maximilano;
Det Virgo omnipotens hostes superare malignos;
Restituat populis pacem terrisque salutem.
Hoc tibi devota carmen Georgius arte
Ordinat Augusti cantor rectorque Capellae,
Sclatkonius praesul Petinensis, sedulus omni
Se in tua commendat studio pia gaudia, mater.
Praecipuum tamen est illi, quo assumpta fuisti,
Quo tu pulchra ut luna micas electa es et ut sol.
Cantus firmus:
Virgo prudentissima, quo progrederis, quasi aurora valde rutilans? Filia Sion.
Tota formosa et suavis es: pulchra ut luna, electa ut sol.

Part 1
When the most wise Virgin, who brought holy joy to the world,
rose above all the spheres and left the stars
beneath her shining feet in gleaming, radiant light,
she was surrounded by the ninefold Ranks
and received by the nine Hierarchies.
She, the friend of suppliants, stood before the face of the supreme God.
You who inhabit eternally the dazzling lights of Heaven
Archangels, leaders of the spirits, and Angels,
and sustaining virtues, and you thrones of princes,
and you holy armies and you powers,
and you dominions of Heaven, and you fiery Cherubim,
and you Seraphim, created from the Word,
say whether such a feeling of joy has ever overwhelmed you
as when you saw the assembly of the Mother of the everlasting Almighty.
She is the queen, powerful in Heaven, on land and at sea;
every Spirit and every human being rightly praises and adores her divine majesty.
Part 2
You, Michael, Gabriel and Raphael, we beg you
to pour out to her chaste ears our prayers and entreaties
for the sacred Empire and for Maximilian the Emperor.
May the all-powerful Virgin grant that he may conquer his wicked enemies
and restore peace to the nations and safety to the lands.
With faithful skill Georgius,
the emperor's Precentor and Kapellmeister, rehearses this anthem for you.
The Governor of the Province of Austria, diligent in all things,
earnestly commends himself to your holy pleasure, mother.
The highest place, however, belongs to Him by whom you were taken up,
so that you shine beautiful as the moon, excellent as the sun.
Cantus firmus
Virgin most wise, where are you going, shining out as brightly as the dawn, Daughter of Sion?
You are most comely and merciful, beautiful as the moon, excellent as the sun.

== Commentaries ==
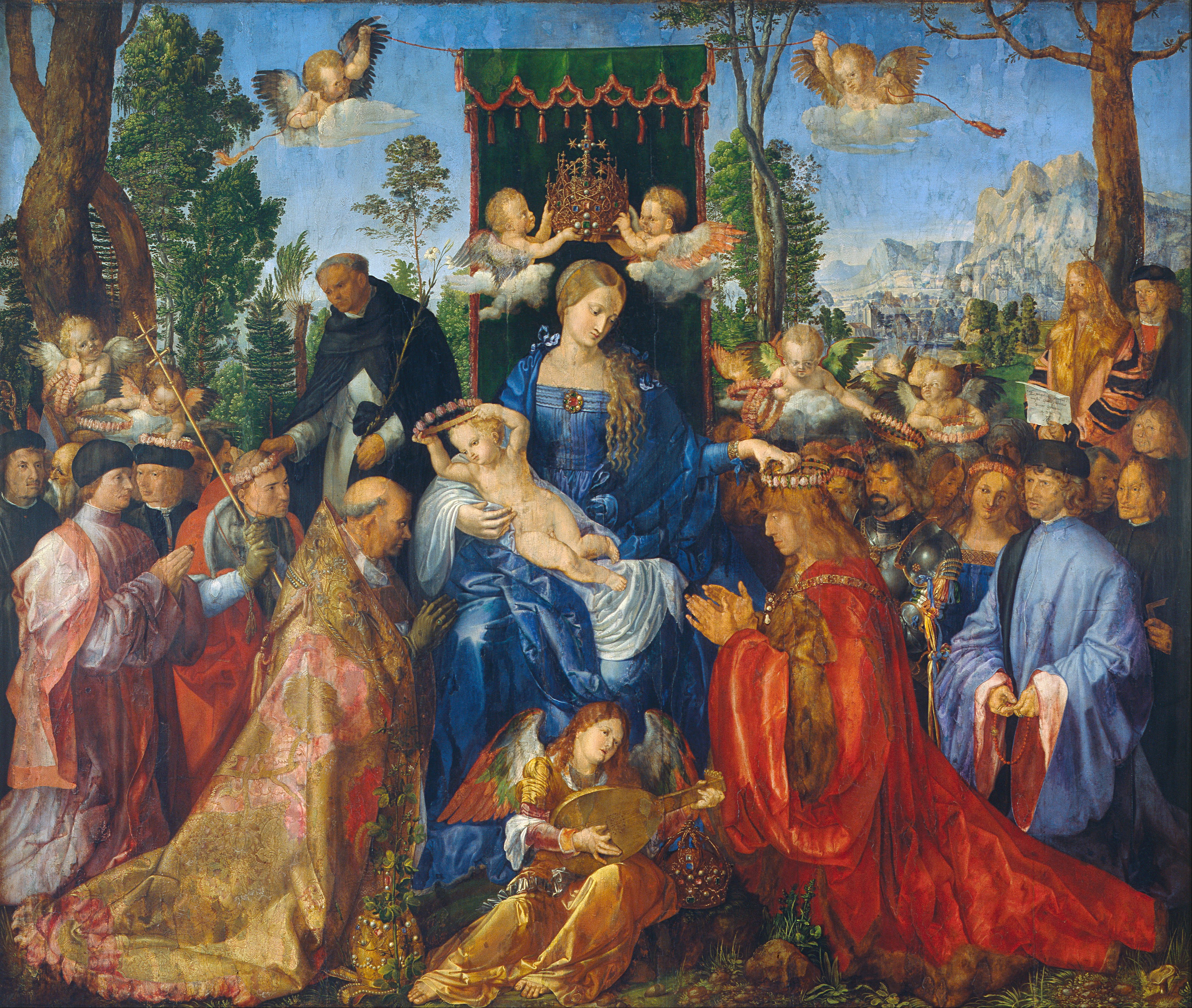
Albrecht Dürer, Feast of the Rosary, 1506

The conductor Peter Philips notes that, "Further illustration of this is provided by the two ceremonial motets which frame the remaining pieces on this recording. Optime pastor and Virgo prudentissima have a grandeur that no other Renaissance composer could rival. The spaciousness is achieved partly by the wide overall scoring of the voices, and partly by Isaac's habit of holding the chant parts back for special moments, rather as Handel later rationed the use of the trumpets and timpani in his 'coronation' anthems. When the chant or chants enter (always in the middle two of the six voice parts), they do so with such solemnity that all the surrounding activity is quietened; and when they cease, the four outer voices immediately readopt faster-moving music. By alternating these two textures Isaac could build up to the final statements of the chant with an irresistible momentum."

Rothenberg opines that the motet affiliates the reigns of two sovereign monarchs – the Virgin Mary of Heaven and Maximilian of the Holy Roman Empire. The motet describes the Assumption of the Virgin, in which Mary, described as the most prudent Virgin (allusion to Parable of the Ten Virgins), "beautiful as the moon", "excellent as the sun" and "glowing brightly as the dawn", was crowned as Queen of Heaven and united with Christ, her bridegroom and son, at the highest place in Heaven. Rothenberg notes that, "In Isaac’s compositions Mary becomes the figurative mother who crowns Maximilian, just as King Solomon's mother had crowned him." The antiphon and the motet evoke the Song of Songs 3:11: "Egredimini et videte filiae Sion regem Salomonem in diademate quo coronavit eum mater sua in die disponsionis illius et in die laetitiae cordis eius" ("Go forth, ye daughters of Sion, and see King Solomon in the diadem, where with his mother crowned him in the day of his espousals, and in the day of the joy of his heart.")

Rothenberg notes that, in the painting Feast of the Rosary by Albrecht Dürer (considered by him to be a “direct visual counterpart” to the motet Virgo prudentissima, mentioned below), "The most prudent Virgin thus crowns the Wise King with a rose garland at the very moment when she herself is about to be crowned Queen of Heaven." Bubenik agrees with Rothenberg's assessment and points out that in the painting one can also see a lute.

Other than Dürer's Feast of the Rosary, Rothenberg opines that the idea of the motet is also reflected in the scene of the Assumption seen in the Berlin Book of hours of Mary of Burgundy and Maximilian.

Planchart notes that Virgo prudentissima is "one of the composer’s most complex and extended works. It is also a self-consciously constructivist piece that looks back to the repertoire of tenor motets pioneered by Guillaume Du Fay, Johannes Ockeghem, and most prominently by Iohannes Regis" and "an extraordinarily impressive work with a seemingly inexhaustible amount of invention". The motet makes use of "an interplay of two basic textures and two kinds of motivic construction that are exposed in the first few sections of each pars and then fused in the concluding section, and to a judicious choice of which phrases of the cantus firmus—an antiphon for vespers of the Assumption—he chooses to paraphrase in the free voices". Planchart also criticizes modern performances for ignoring the motet's mensural structure.

Charles Edward Trinkaus and Heiko Oberman comment that, "Virgo prudentissima is one of the noblest compositions of its type written during the early Renaissance and it is the epitome of the paraliturgical motet."

The book Boston Early Music Festival & Exhibition notes that the motet is "monumental and unmistakably imperial in effect" while the work O Maria, mater Christi (by the same composer) feels intimate and personal.
