= 1546 in music =

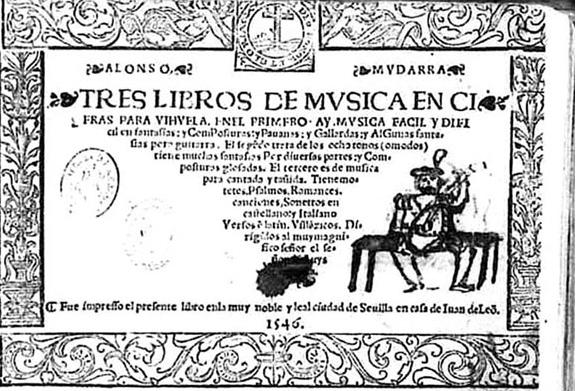
Three books of tablature for vihuela ("Tres libros de música en cifra para vihuela") by Alonso Mudarra, 1546

== Events ==
- January 1 – Arnold von Bruck retires from his position as Kapellmeister at the Viennese court.
- May - Cipriano de Rore appointed maestro do cappella at the court in Ferrara, a post he held until 1559.
- Jacquet de Berchem appointed maestro di cappella at Verona Cathedral

== Publications ==
- Giulio Abondante - Intabolatura di Iulio Abondante sopra el lauto de ogni sorte de balli, the first of three extant books of lute music published in Venice by Antonio Gardano
- Paolo Aretino – Pie ac devotissime Lamentationes Hyeremie prophete tum etiam Passiones Hiesu Christi Dominice Palmarum ac Veneris Sancti (Venice: Angelo Gardano), a collection of litanies
- Jacquet de Berchem – First book of madrigals for five voices (Venice: Antonio Gardano)
- Simon Boyleau – Madrigals for four voices
- Giovan Tomaso di Maio – Canzone villanesche a 3, book 1
- Antoine de Mornable
  - Motetorum Musicalium, book 1, for four voices (Paris: Pierre Attaingnant)
  - 17 Psalms for four voices (Paris: Pierre Attaingnant)
- Alonso Mudarra - 'Three Books of Music for vihuela in tablature' (Seville: Juan de Leon)
- Caspar Othmayr – Epitaphium D. Martini Lutheri for five voices (Nuremberg: Johann vom Berg & Ulrich Neuber)
- Girolamo Parabosco – Madrigali a cinque voci (Venice: Antonio Gardano)

== Births ==
- date unknown –
- September 3 – Isabella Bendidio, Italian noblewoman and singer (died 1610)
- October 5 – Cyriakus Schneegass, German hymnwriter (d. 1597)

date unknown

  - Luca Bati, Italian composer (died 1608)
  - Joachim a Burck, German hymn writer, composer, organist and Kantor (died 1610)

== Deaths ==
- Fridolin Sicher (56), organist and composer
- Hans Ott, music publisher and editor
