= Hans Otto =

Hans Otto may refer to:

- Hans Otto Löwenstein (1881–1931), Austrian film director and screenwriter
- Hans Otto (actor) (1900–1933), German stage actor
- Hans Otto (organist) (1922–1996), German organist, harpsichordist and cantor
- Hans Ott (died 1546), also known as Hans Otto, German publisher and editor
