= Hans Ott =

16th-century German music publisher

Hans Ott, sometimes given as Johannes Ott, Hans Otto, Hans Ottler, or Hans Ottel, (before 1500 – February 1546) was a German publisher and editor. In the first quarter of the 1500s he was a publisher and bookseller in Regensburg. He left there when he was forcibly expelled from the city in 1524. He established a similar business in Nuremberg in 1525 which he operated until his death in 1546. He is best remembered for his work as a music publisher, and for the publication of several pharmacological texts. Composers whose work he published included Heinrich Isaac, Ludwig Senfl, and Josquin des Prez. He published a number of music anthologies which included works by many Bavarian composers of the period.
