= Choralis Constantinus =

The Choralis Constantinus is a collection of over 375 Gregorian chant-based polyphonic motets for the proper of the mass composed by Heinrich Isaac and his pupil Ludwig Senfl. The genesis of the collection is a commission by the Constance Cathedral for Isaac, at that time the official court composer for the Holy Roman Emperor Maximilian I, to compose a set of motets for the special holy days celebrated in the diocese of Constance. Isaac was in Constance at the time (April 1508) with the Imperial court as Maximilian had called a meeting of the German nobility (Reichstag) there. The music was delivered to the Constance Cathedral in late 1508 and early 1509.

After Isaac's death in 1517 his pupil Ludwig Senfl, who had been a member of the Imperial chapel choir, compiled music composed for Constance and for the Habsburg Imperial court into the collection which was published by Hieronymus Formschneider in Nuremberg in three volumes (1550–1555) and titled the Choralis Constantinus. Gerhard Pätzig, in his dissertation for the University of Tübingen in 1956, compared available manuscripts with the Formschneider print and determined that the music written for the Constance Cathedral was most of that contained in Volume II and parts of Volume III of the Formschneider publication. The remainder of the Choralis Constantinus is from Maximilian's court repertory.

A modern edition appeared in Volumes 10 and 32 of Denkmäler der Tonkunst in Österreich, the latter edited by Anton Webern, the famous composer, who was a composition student of Arnold Schoenberg. He prepared this volume as part of his dissertation for the University of Vienna, where he received his PhD in 1906. Volume III, edited by Louise Cuyler, was published by the University of Michigan Press in 1950. The Formschneider edition was reprinted with short introductory essays by Edward R. Lerner (Peer: Alamire, 1990–1994).

Each Feast contains a polyphonic motet, based on the corresponding Gregorian chant for the Introit, Alleluia (or Tract) and Communion. Volume II contains most of the Solemn Feasts. Those Propers all include alternate verses of the Sequence hymn, set thus so as to allow for alternatim performance between the choir and the organist. The medieval Sequence was of particular interest to the Constance diocese, which included the monasteries of Reichenau and St. Gall where many Sequences originated.

Choralis Constantinus I (Denkmäler der Tonkunst in Österreich, Volume 10):

Asperges me Domine/Gloria Patri
	Introit	Alleluia	Tract	Sequence	Communion
De Sanctissima Trinitate	Benedicta sit sancta Trinitas	Benedictus es, Domine		Benedicta semper sancta sit Trinitas	Benedicite Deum
Domenica I p. Pentecosten	Domine in tua	Domine Deus salutis			Narrabo omnia mirabili
Domenica II p. Pentecosten	Factus est Dominus	Deus judex justus			Cantabo Domino
Domenica III p. Pentecosten	Respice in me	Diligam te virtus			Ego clamavi
Domenica IV p. Pentecosten	Dominus illuminatio	Domine in virtu te			Dominus firmamentum
Domenica V p. Pentecosten	Exaudi Domine	In te Domine			Unam petii
Domenica VI p. Pentecosten	Dominus fortitudo	Omnes gentes plaudite			Circuibo et immolabo
Domenica VII p. Pentecosten	Omnes gentes plaudite	Eripe me de inimicis			Inclina aurem
Domenica VIII p. Pentecosten	Suscepimus Deus	Te decet hymnus			Gustate et videte
Domenica IX p. Pentecosten	Ecce Deus	Attendite populo			Primum regnum
Domenica X p. Pentecosten	Dum clamarum	Exultate Deo			Acceptabis sacrificium
Domenica XI p. Pentecosten	Deus in loco				Honora de tua
Domenica XII p. Pentecosten	Deus meus	Domine refugium			De fructu saciabitur
Domenica XIII p. Pentecosten	Respice Domine	Venite exultemus			Panem dedisti
Domenica XIV p. Pentecosten	Protector et respice	Quoniam magnus			Panis quem ego
Domenica XV p. Pentecosten	Inclina Domine	Paratum cor			Qui manducat
Domenica XVI p. Pentecosten	Miserere nostri Domine	In exitu			Domine memora
Domenica XVII p. Pentecosten	Justus es Domine	Dilexi quoniam			Vovete Domino
Domenica XVIII p. Pentecosten	Da pacem Domine	Laudate Dominum			Tollite et introite
Domenica XIX p. Pentecosten	Salus populi	Dextera Dei			Tu mandisti
Domenica XX p. Pentecosten	Omnia quae	Deus judex			Memento servo tua
Domenica XXI p. Pentecosten	In voluntate	De profundis			In salutari anima mea
Domenica XXII p. Pentecosten	Si iniquitates	Confiteor tibi			Dico vobis
Domenica XXIII p. Pentecosten	Dixit Dominum	Qui posuit			Amen Dico vobis
Adventus I	Ad te levavi	Ostende nobis			Dominus dabit
Adventus II	Popule Sion	Laetatus Sion			Jerusalem surge
Adventus III	Gaudete in Domino	Excita Domine			Dicite confortamini
Adventus IV	Memento nostri	Veni Domine			Ecce virgo
Domenica intra oct. Epiphaniae	In excelso	Jubilate Deo			Fili quid ego
Domenica I p. Epiphaniae	Omnis terra	Laudate Deum			Dicit Dominum
Domenica II p. Epiphaniae	Adorate Deum	Dominus regnavit			Mirabantur omnes
Septuagesima	Circumdederunt me		De profundis		Illumina faciem
Sexagesima	Exurge quare		Commovisti Domine		Introibo adalta
Quinquagesima	Esto mihi		Jubilate Domino		Manducaverunt et
Cinerum	Misereris omnium		Domine non secundum		Qui mediatur
Invocavit	Invocabit et ego		Qui habitat		Scapulis suis
Reminiscere	Reminiscere miserationum		Dixit Dominus		Intelligite clamorem
Oculi	Oculi mei		Ad te levavi		Passer invenit
Laetare	Laetare Jerusalem		Qui confidunt		Jerusalem quae
Judica	Judica me Deus		Saepe expugnaverunt		Hoc corpus
Palmarum	Domine ne longa		Deus meus		Pater si non
Quasimodo geniti	Quasimodo geniti				Mitte manum
Misericordia Domini	Misericordia Domini	Surrexit pastor			Ego sum pastor
Jubilate	Jubilate omnis terra	Surrexit Christus			Modicum et non
Cantate	Cantate Domino				Cum venerit
Vocem Jucunditatis	Vocem jucunditatis	Benedictus es			Cantate Domino
Exaudi	Exaudi Domine				Pater cum

Choralis Constantinus II (Denkmäler der Tonkunst in Österreich, Volume 32):

	Introit	Alleluia	Sequence	Communion	Other
Natalis Domini	Puer natus	Dies sanctificatus	Natus ante saecula	Viderunt omnes	
Circumcisionis	Vultum tuum	Post partum	Laetabundus exsultet	Simile homini	
Epiphanie (6 Jan.)	Ecce advenit	Vidimus stellam	Festa Christi	Vidimus stellam	
Purificationis Mariae (2 Feb.)	Suscepimus Deus	Post partum	Concentu parilli	Responsum Simeon	Gaude Maria (tract)
Anunciationis Mariae (25 Mar.)	Rorate coeli			Ecce virgo	Ave Maria (tract)
Resurrectione Domini	Resurrexi et adhuc	Pascha nostrum	Laudes Salvatori	Pascha nostrum	Haec Dies (gradual)
Ascensionis Domini	Viri Galilei	Dominus in sina	Summi Triumphum	Psallite qui ascendit	
Sancto Spiritus	Spiritus Domini	Veni sancte Spiritus	Sancti Spiritus	Factus est	
Corpore Christi	Cibavit eos	Caro mea	Lauda Sion	Qui manducat	
Johannis Baptistae	De ventre	Internatos mulierum	Sancti baptistae	Tu puer propheta	
Johannes et Pauli	Multae et dehis	Isti sunt	Haec die veneranda	Et sicoram tormenta	
Petri et Pauli	Nunc scio	Tu es Petrus	Petre summi Christi	Tu es Petrus	
Visitationis Mariae (31 May, formerly July)	Gaudeamus omnes	Magnificat	Lauda sponsa	Beata viscera	
Mariae Magdalena	Gaudeamus omnes	Maria haec	Laus tibi Christe	Dico vobis	
Assumptio Mariae (15 August)	Gaudeamus omnes	Assumpta est Maria	Congaudent angelorum	Dilexisti justi	
Sancto Geberhardo	Sacerdotes Domine	O Geberhardo	Sancti Spiritus assist nobis	Beatus servus	
Sancta Pelagio	Laetabitur justus	O Pelagio	Omnes devota mente	Qui vult ab neget	
Nativitatis Mariae (8 Sep.)	Gaudeamus omnes	Nativitatis gloriosae	Stirpe Maria regis	Diffusa est	
Dedicatione Templi	Terribilis est	Vox exultationis	Ecclesiae desponsato	Domus mea	
Sancta Cruce	Nos autem	Dulce lignum	Laudes crucis	Nos autem	
Omnia Sanctorum	Gaudeamus omnes	Vox exultationis	Omnes sancti Seraphim	Amen dico vobis	
Sancto Martino	Sacerdotes	Martinus episcobus	Sacerdotem Christi	Beatus servus	
Presentationis Mariae	Gaudeamus omnes	Felix virgo	Altissima providente	Beata viscera	
Sancto Conrado (26 Nov.)	Sacerdotes	Ecce sacerdos	Adornata laudibus	Beatus servus	
Conceptionis Mariae (8 Dec.)	Gaudeamus omnes	Conceptionis gloriosae	Conceptio Mariae virginis	Diffusa est	

Choralis Constantinus III (University of Michigan Press, 1950)

	Introit	Alleluia	Sequence	Communion	Other
In Vigilia un. Apostoli	Ego autem sicut	Dorsa eorum	Plausu chorus laetabundo	Ego vos elegi	Justus ut palma (gradual)
Commune Apostolorum	Mihi autem honorati	Non vos me elegisti Per manus autem Iam no estis	Clare sanctorum	Vos qui secuti Amen dico ego	Qui seminant (tract)
Commune Martyrum	Multae tribulationis Induant sancti tui Justi epulentur Sancti tui Domine; Sapientiam sanctorum Salus autem justorum Intret in conspectu	Corpora sanctorum Justi autem Justi epulentur Te martirum Stabunt justi Gaudete justi Laetamini in Domino; Sancti tui Domine	O beata beatorum Agone triumphali	Multitudo languentium Justorum animae Et si coram Posuerunt mortalia Anima nostra Amen dico vobis Gaudete justi	Qui seminant (tract as above)
Commune un. Martyris	Laetabitur justus In virtute tua Gloria et honore Protexisti me Deus; Justus non conturbabitur Justus ut palma	Laetabitur justus Beatus vir Justus germinabit Justus ut palma	Spe mercedis et coronae Haec est sancta	Laetabitur justus Qui mihi ministrat Posuisti Domine; Qui vult venire Magna est gloria	Desiderium animae (tract)
Commune de Confessoribus	Stauit ei Dominus; Os justi Sacerdotes Dei; Sacerdotes ejus	Juravit Dominus; Elegit te Inveni David; Iste est qui ante Amavit eum Fulgebunt	Dilectus Deo; Ad laudes salvatoris	Beatus servus Domine quinque talenta Fidelis servus	Beatus vir (tract)
Commune de Virginibus	Gaudeamus omnes Me exspectaverunt Loquebar de testimoniis Dilexisti justitiam	Diffusa est Specie tua Omnis gloria	Exultent filiae Sion	Simile est regnum Quinque prudentes Diffusa est gratia Dilexisti justitiam	Audi filia (tract)
Annunciatiatione beate Virginis	Rorate coeli	Prophetae sancti	Mittet ad Virginem		
Beata Virgine p. Nativitatis Christi	Vultum tuum	Post partum	Regem regnum		
Commune de Beata Virgine	Salva sancta	Sancta Dei	Verbum bonum	Beata viscera	
Philippi et Jacobi	Exclamaverunt			Tanto tempore	
Sancta Cruce	Nos autem	Dulce lignum	Laudes crucis	Nos autem	
In Vigilia Johannis Baptistae	Ne timeas				
Natalis Johannis Baptistae	De ventre matris	Erat Johannis	Sancti Baptistae	Tu puer propheta	
Vigilia Petri et Pauli	Dicit Dominus			Simon Johannis	
Festo de Petri et Pauli	Nunc scio vere	Tu es Petrus		Tu es Petrus	
Sancti Pauli	Scio cui credidi	Tu es vas electionis			
Visitationis Mariae Virginis		In Maria benignitas	Veni praecelsa		
In Divisione Apostolorum			Coeli enarrant		
Maria Magdalenae			Laus tibi Christi	Dico vobis	
Vigilia Sancta Laurentii	Dispersit dedit				
Sancta Laurentii Martyris	Confessio et pulchritudo	Levita Laurentius	Laurentii, David		
Assumptio Maria Virgine		Assumpta est Maria	Congaudent Angelorum		
Navitatis Mariae		Nativitatis gloriosae	Stirpe Maria		
Sancta Michaele	Benedicite omnes	Concussum est mare	Ad celebres Rex	Benedicite omnes	
S. Ursula ac Sociarum Virginum			Virginalis turma sexus		
	Kyrie solemne	[Gloria]	[Credo]	[Sanctus]	[Agnus]
	Kyrie Paschale	[Gloria]	[Credo]	[Sanctus]	[Agnus]
	Kyrie Magne Deus	[Gloria]	[Credo]	[Sanctus]	[Agnus]
De Martyribus	Kyrie	[Gloria]	[Credo]	[Sanctus]	[Agnus]
De Confessoribus	Kyrie	[Gloria]	[Credo]	[Sanctus]	[Agnus]

== Recordings ==
Margaretha-Maximilian I, Capilla Flamenca together with La Caccia, Schola Cantorum Cantate Domino, Schola Gregoriana Lovaniensis and Joris Verdin, 2001 (Orf CD 265). Contains proper chants from the Choralis Constantinus along with several pieces of secular music.
