= Antoine de Mornable =

- Origin: France
- Occupation: Composer
- Years active: 1540s

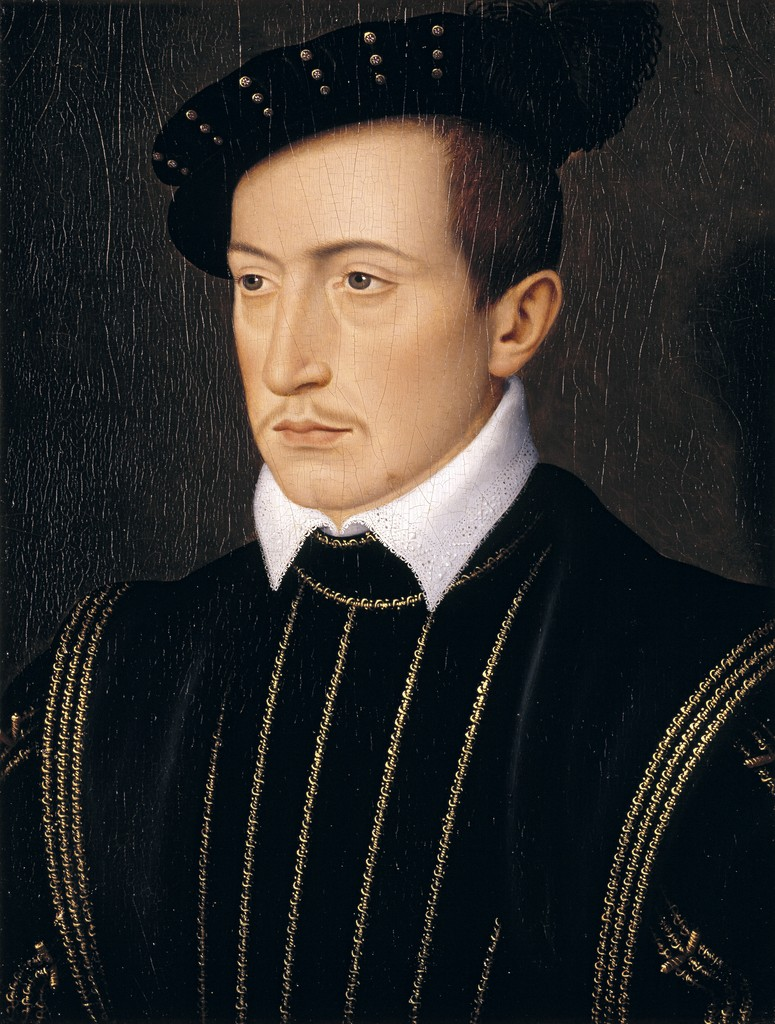
Mornable's employer, Guy XVII, count of Laval between 1531 and 1547. Portrait by François Clouet.

Antoine de Mornable (fl. 1540s) was a French composer who was maitre de chapelle for count Guy de Laval in 1546. His best known work is the chanson "Je ne scay", recorded by artists including the Kings Singers (1973). His works include two volumes of French psalms for Huguenot use.
