= Large Triumphal Carriage =

Woodcut by Albrecht Dürer

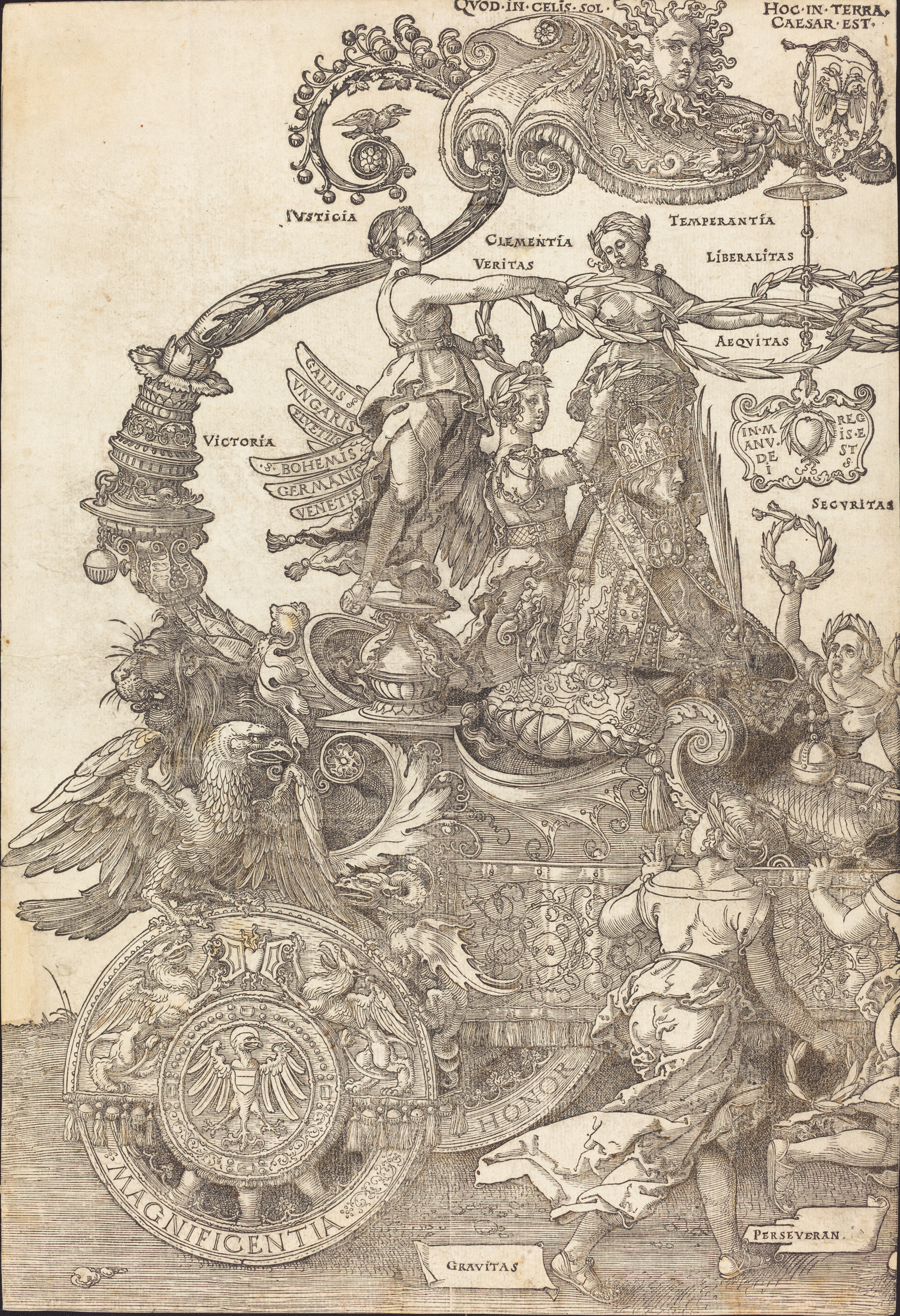
The left-most of eight prints comprising the Large Triumphal Carriage

The Large Triumphal Carriage or Great Triumphal Car (in German, Triumphwagen) is a large 16th-century woodcut print by Albrecht Dürer, commissioned by the Holy Roman Emperor Maximilian I. The work was originally intended to be the central part of a 54 metres (177 ft) long print of a Triumphal Procession or Triumph of Maximilian, depicting Maximilian and his court entourage in a procession. This section shows the emperor in his triumphal car, and was part of a tradition depicting imaginary "triumphs" or real processions, such as royal entries.

The work is one of three huge prints created for Maximilian, the other being a Triumphal Arch (1512–1515, 192 woodcut panels, 3.0 metres (10 ft) high and 3.7 metres (12 ft) wide) also designed by Albrecht Dürer, and the Triumphal Procession (1516–1518, 137 woodcut panels, 54 metres (177 ft) long). The monumental projects reflect Maximilian's position as Holy Roman Emperor, and link him to the triumphal arches and triumphs of Ancient Rome. Only the Triumphal Arch was completed before Maximilian's death in 1519, and distributed as Imperial propaganda as he intended.

The completed Large Triumphal Carriage is a composite image printed from 8 separate wood blocks created by Willibald Pirckheimer. It measures approximately 0.46 metres (1.5 ft) high 2.4 metres (8 ft) long. Two blocks depict a large carriage or chariot in which Maximilian sits alone, holding a sceptre and a palm and wearing the imperial robes and the crown of the Holy Roman Empire and surrounded by the four cardinal virtues - Iustitia (justice), Fortitudo (fortitude), Prudentia (prudence) and Temperantia (temperance). The emperor sits under the crown held aloft by a Victory, whose feathered wings bear the names of Maximilian's military campaigns: "Gallis" (France), "Ungaris" (Hungary), "Bohemis" (Bohemia), "Elvetiis" (Switzerland), "Germanis" (Germany) and "Venetis" (Venice). The other six plates each show a pair of horses with luxurious harnesses, pulling the carriage along. Many parts of the print are labelled to explain the complex iconography: the wheels are marked "Magnificentia" (magnificence), "Dignitas" (dignity), "Gloria" (glory) and "Honor" (honour); one rein is marked "Nobilitas" (nobility) and the other "Potentia" (power). The driver of the carriage is "Ratio" (reason). Each horse is attended by a female figure carrying a wreath: from rear to front, "Providentia" (providence) and "Moderatio" (moderation), "Alacritas" (quickness) and "Opportunitas" (opportunity), "Velocitas" (speed) and "Firmitudo" (firmness), "Acrimonia" (sharpness/keen-ness/vigor) and "Virilitas" (virility), "Audacia" (audacity) and "Magnanimitas" (magananiminty), and "Experientia" (experience) and "Solertia" (skill). The carriage is also attended by four female figures: "Gravitas" (gravity), "Perserverantia" (perseverance), "Fidentia" (fidelity) and "Securitas" (security). Lettering above explains the iconography, and the front pair of horses are accompanied by a text recording the commission from Maximilian to Pirckheimer dated Innsbruck, 1518.

Dürer's allegorical figures are based on prints of dancing nymphs by Andrea Mantegna.

The work was originally intended to be the central part of the Triumph of Maximilian, a work that was proposed in 1512, when Maximilian made his last visit to Nuremberg, and met Dürer. Dürer's first design drawings of 1512–13 are held by the Albertina in Vienna, and show a much smaller carriage. A watercolour of a second more elaborate scheme drawn in 1518 by Dürer with suggestions by Willibald Pirckheimer is also held by the Albertina. In the earlier works, Maximilian is accompanied in the carriage by members of his family, but they were omitted in the final print.

After Maximilian's death in 1519, and the ending of the annual pension of 100 florins paid to Dürer under Maximilian, Dürer published the prints of the completed carriage as a separate work in 1522, with text in German, dedicated to Maximilian and Charles V. This may have been an attempt by Dürer to raise funds by selling the prints, or as a demonstration of his loyalty to encourage the restoration of his stipend. The remaining parts of the Triumphal Procession, mostly designed by Hans Burgkmair from about 1512, were first published in 1526 on the orders of Archduke Ferdinand.

The original blocks were used to print seven editions of the print. The first edition was published in Nuremberg by Dürer himself, with explanatory text by Pirckheimer in German in 1522, with a second edition in Latin in 1523. A third and fourth edition in German and Latin was published in around 1559, and a fifth edition was published in Venice in 1589 by the German printer Jacubus Chinig. Examples of the fifth edition are held by the British Museum and the Library of Congress. A sixth and seventh edition were printed before 1601, by which time the woodblocks were becoming very worn. The original blocks are also held in the collection of the Albertina.

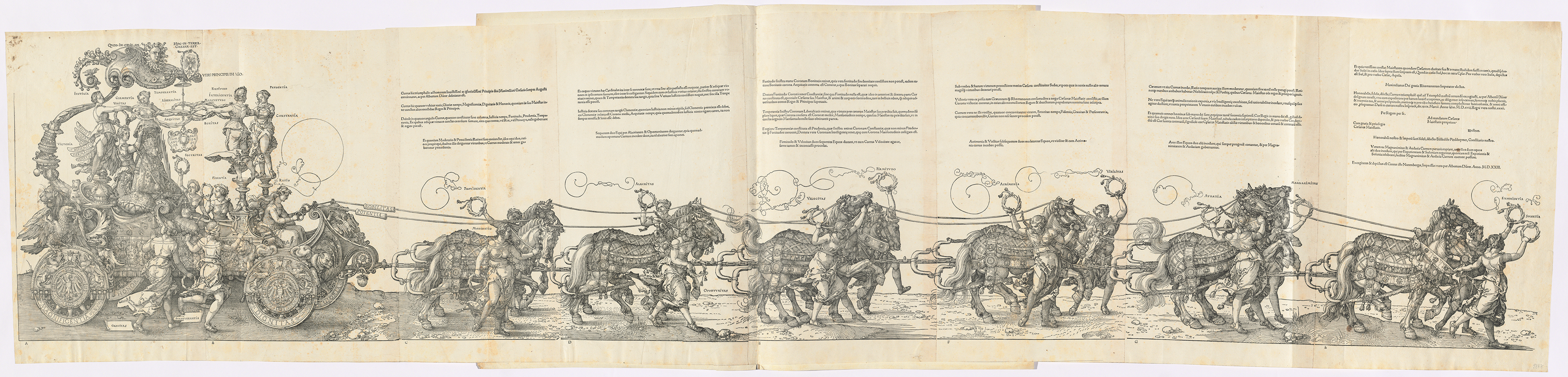

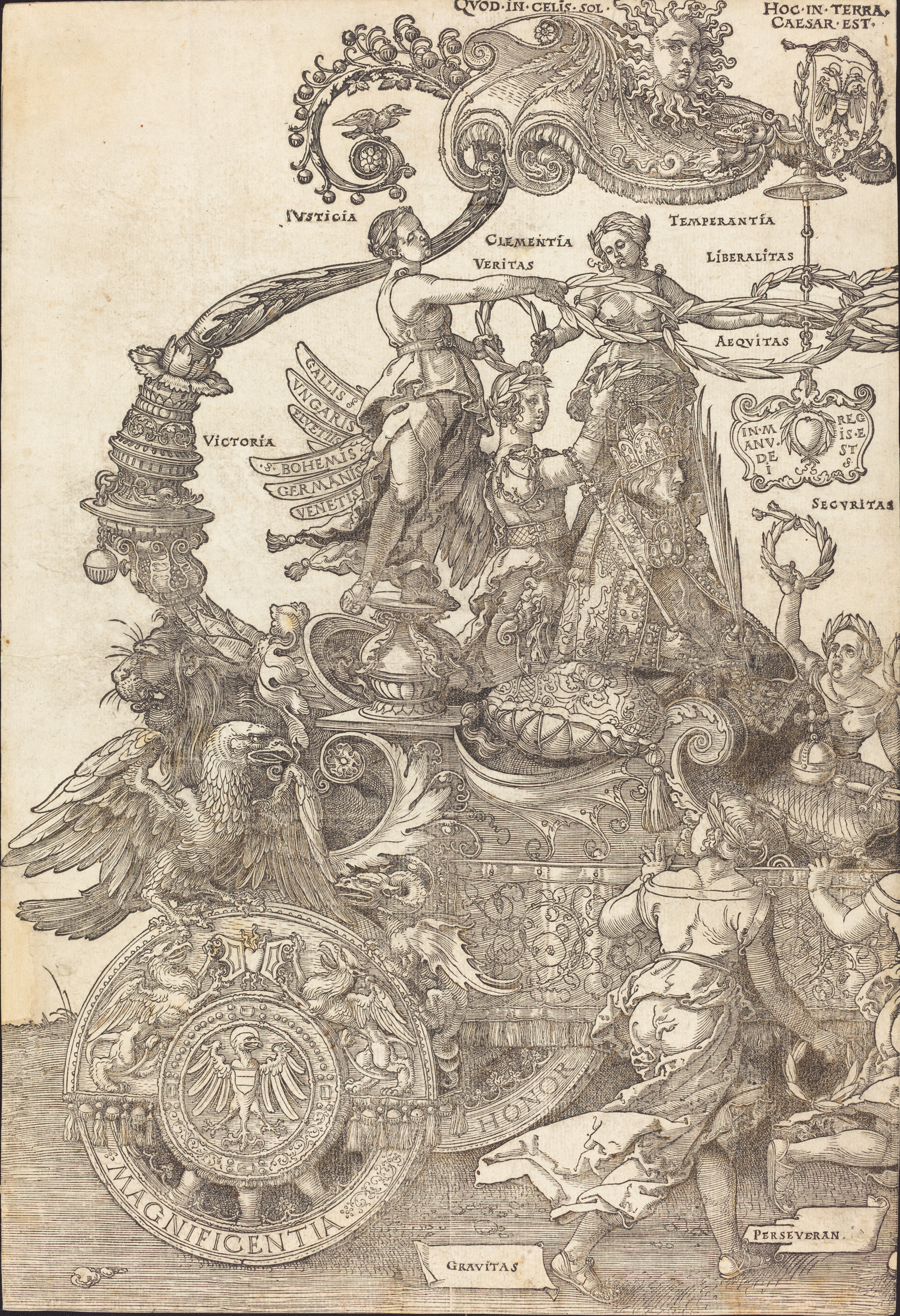
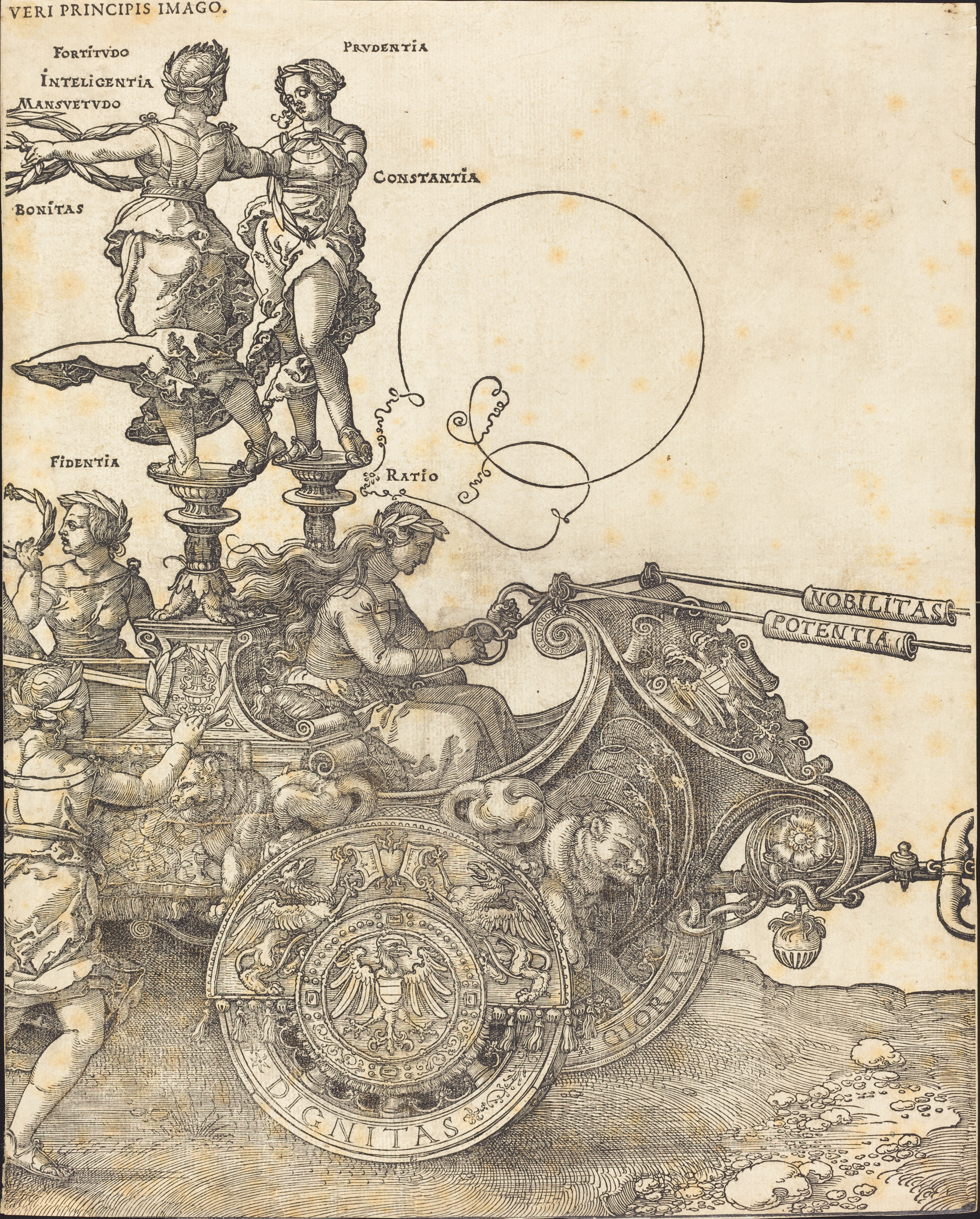
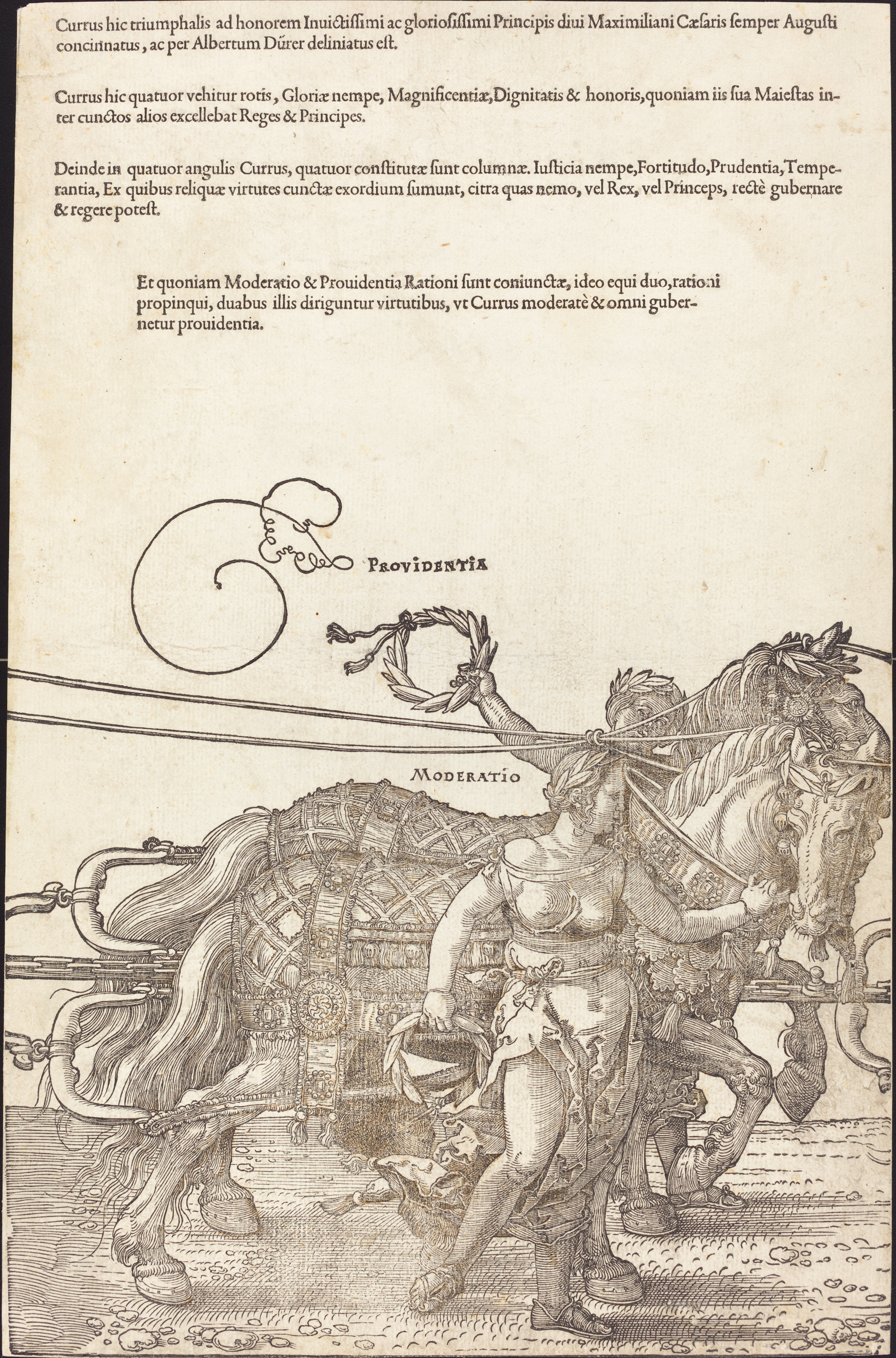
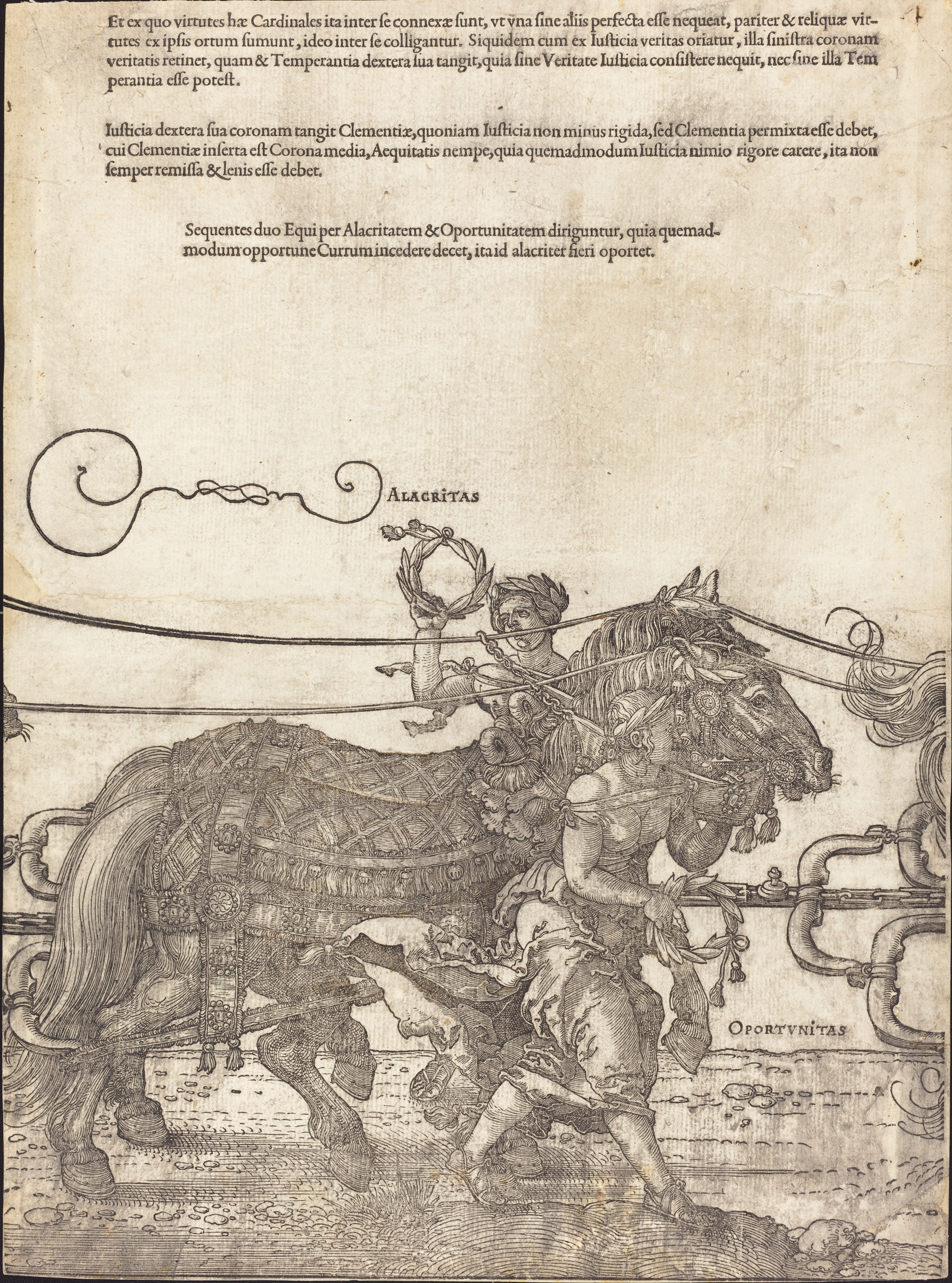
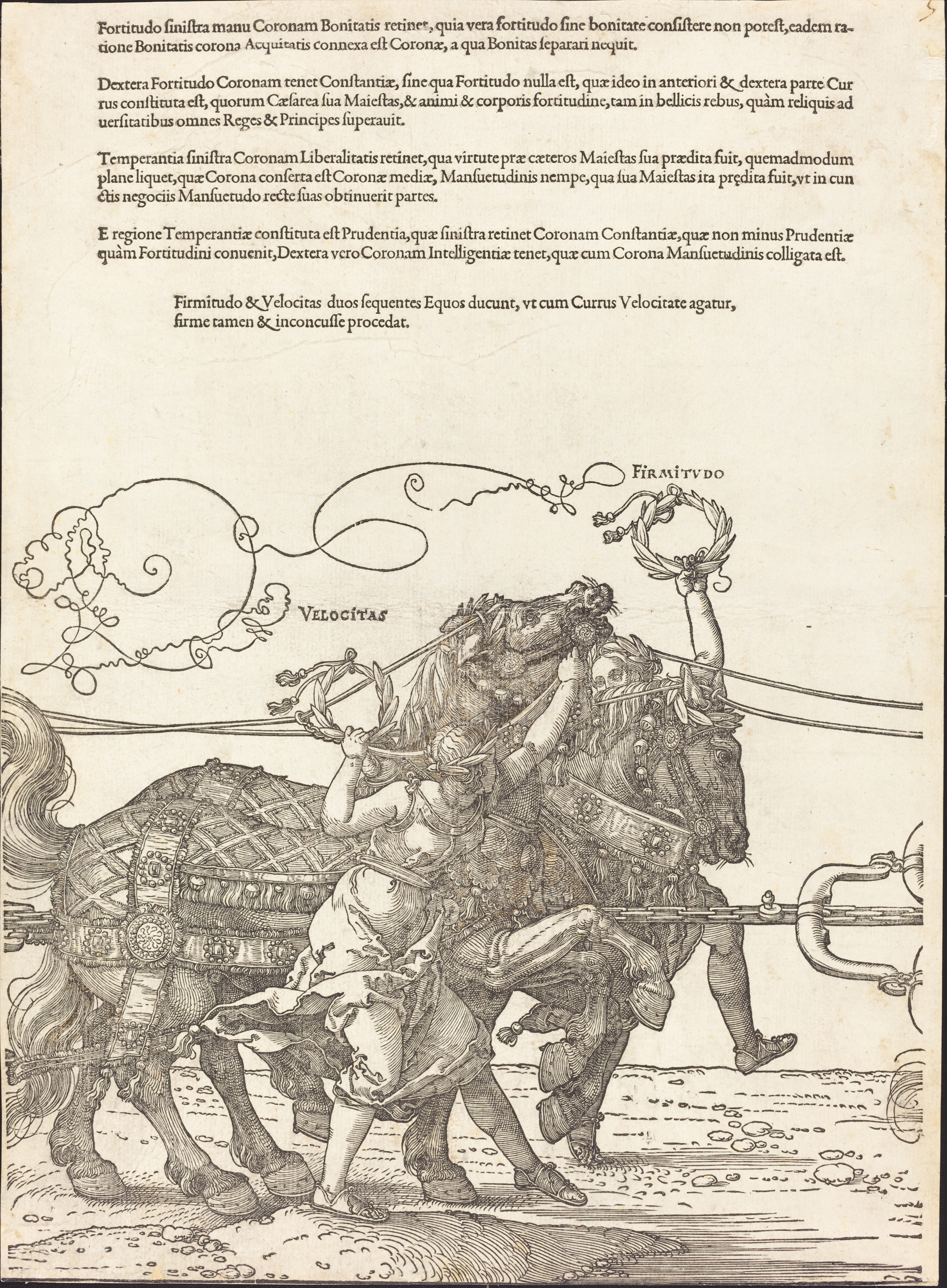
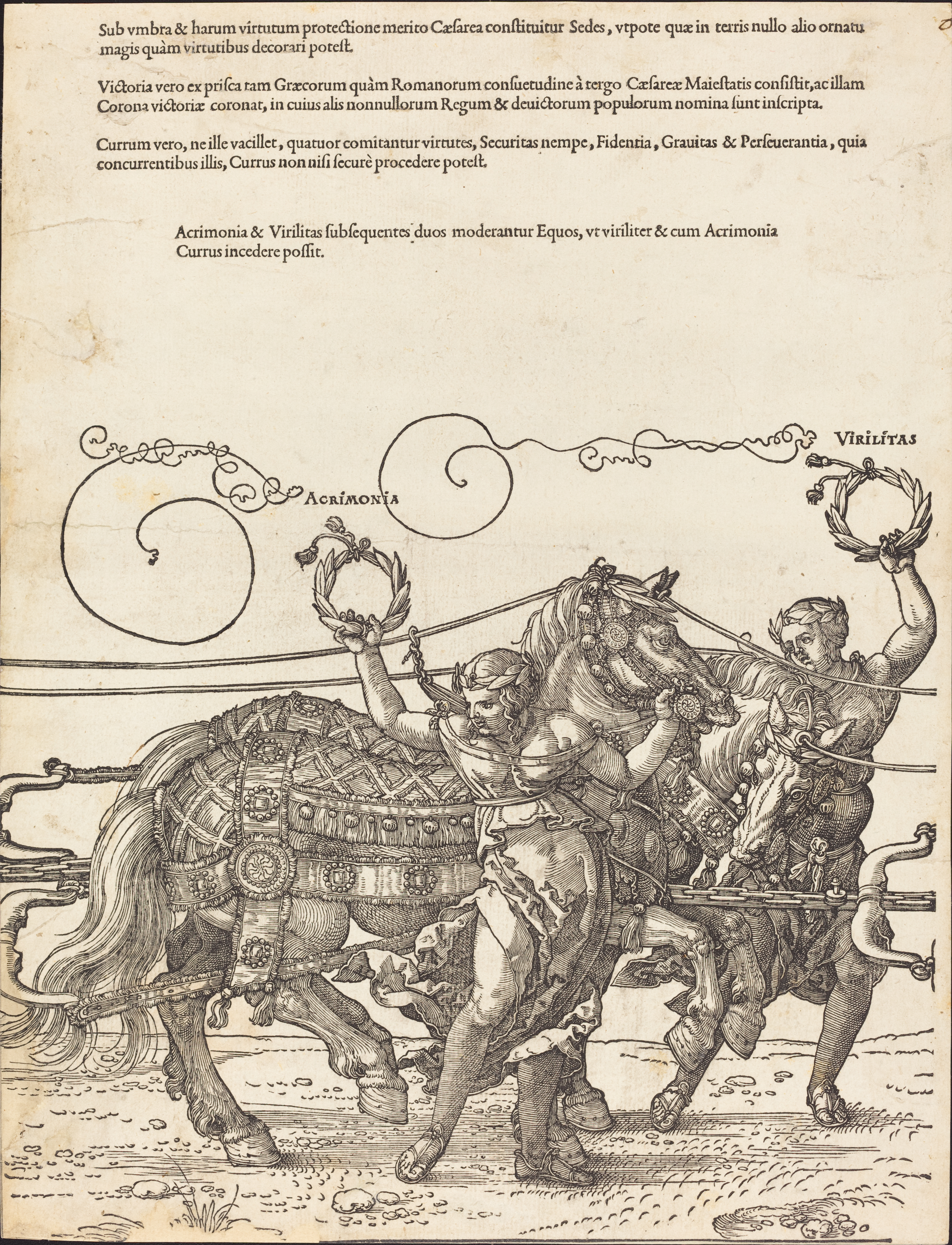
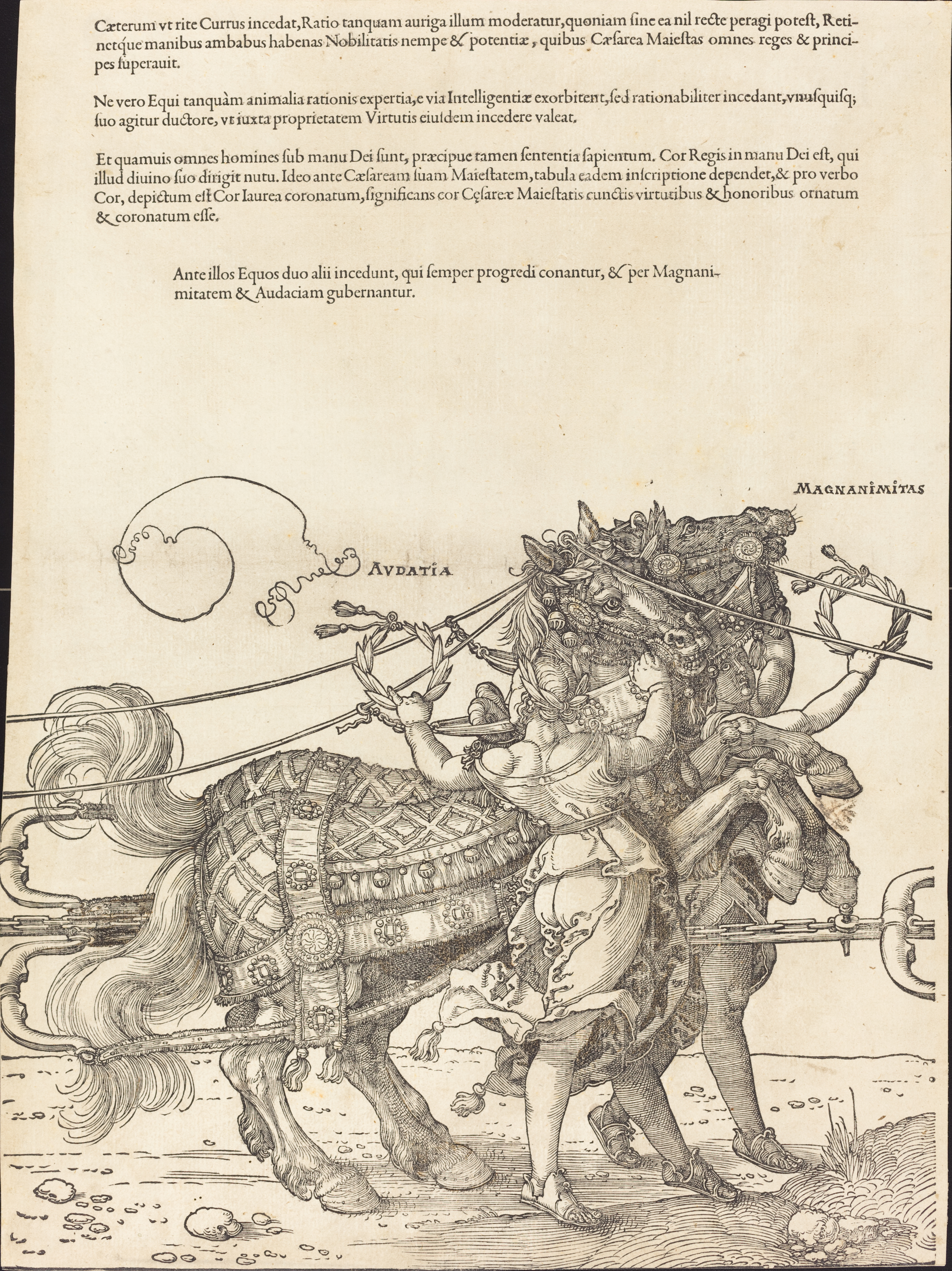
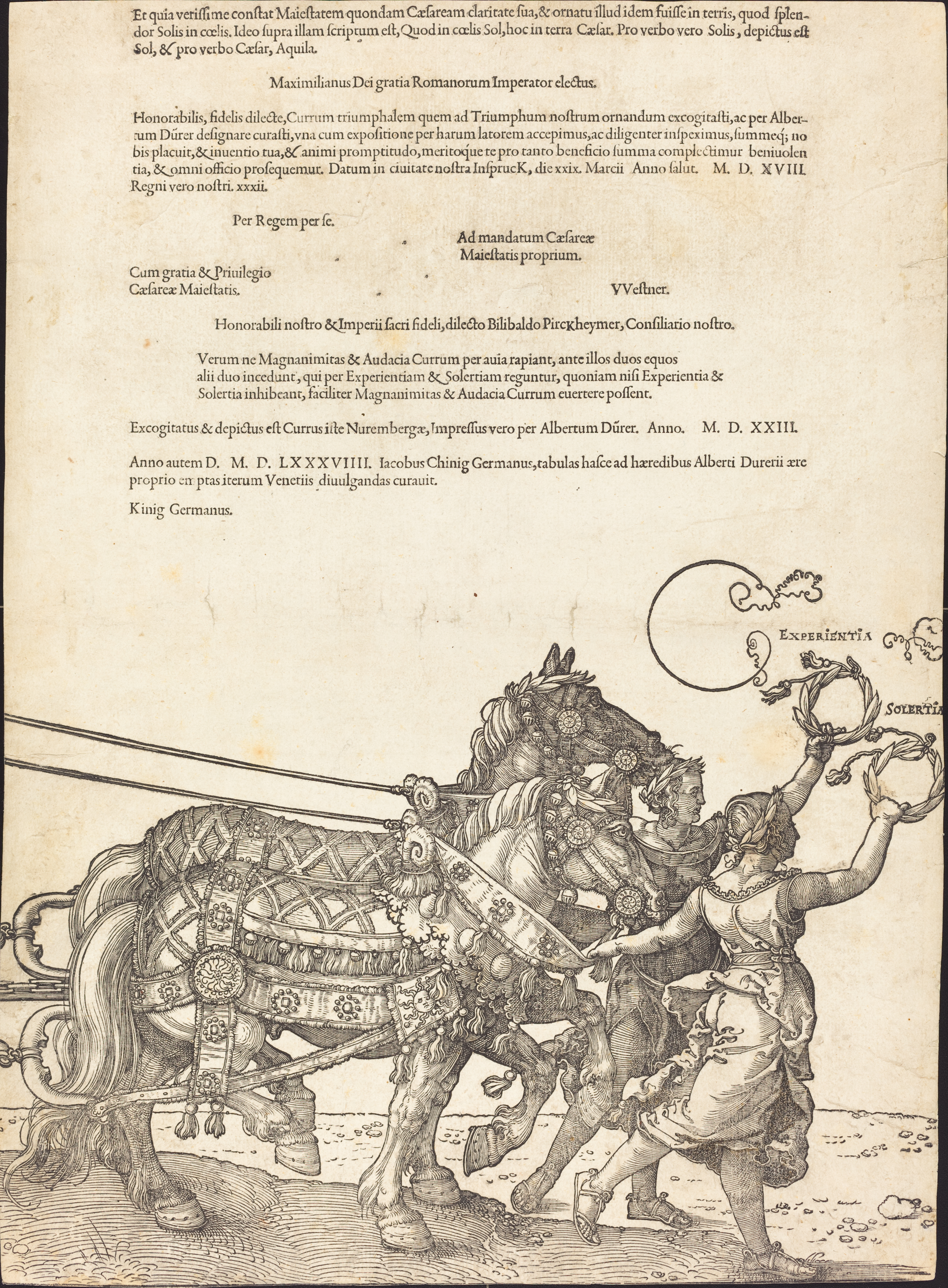

== See also ==
- List of engravings by Albrecht Dürer
- List of woodcuts by Albrecht Dürer
