= Ludwig Senfl =

Swiss composer

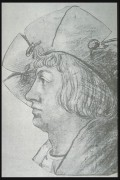
Undated portrait of Senfl c.1510. Artist unknown

Ludwig Senfl (born around 1486, died between December 2, 1542 and August 10, 1543) was a Swiss composer of the Renaissance, active in Germany. He was the most famous pupil of Heinrich Isaac, was music director to the court of Maximilian I, Holy Roman Emperor, and was an influential figure in the development of the Franco-Flemish polyphonic style in Germany. He and his teacher Isaac played an important role in the development of the German folksongs and their adoption as models for polyphonic compositions as well.

== Life ==
Senfl was probably born in Basel around 1486, and lived in Zürich from 1488 until 1496, when he joined the choir of the Hofkapelle of Emperor Maximilian I in Augsburg. Apart from one brief visit in 1504 he appears never again to have lived in Switzerland.

In 1497 he followed the Hofkapelle to Vienna, and between 1500 and 1504 he probably studied in Vienna for three years, the standard practice for choirboys whose voices had broken, as part of the normal training for the priesthood. During this period he studied with Heinrich Isaac, serving as his copyist by 1509; he is known to have copied much of the older composer's Choralis Constantinus, an enormous work which he was later to complete after Isaac's death.

After a trip to Italy sometime between 1508 and 1510, Senfl returned to the Hofkapelle; the Emperor appointed him to fill Isaac's position as court composer when Isaac died in 1517. In 1518 Senfl lost a toe in a hunting accident; evidently the injury disabled him for up to a year. When the Emperor died in 1519, Senfl was out of a job, and his circumstances altered for the worse: Charles V dismissed most of Maximilian's musicians, and even refused to pay Senfl the annual stipend which had been promised to him in the event of the emperor's death. During the next few years he traveled widely, mainly job-seeking, but he was also active as a composer. In the year 1520 he worked as an editor (and possibly also as a proofreader) on the motet anthology Liber selectarum cantionum which was printed the same year in Augsburg in the workshop of Sigmund Grimm and Marcus Wirsung. He is known to have attended the Diet of Worms in 1521, and, while he never officially became a Protestant, his sympathies evidently were with Luther, and he was later examined by the Inquisition and voluntarily gave up his priesthood. Senfl carried on an extensive correspondence both with Lutheran Duke Albrecht of Prussia and with Martin Luther himself, beginning in 1530.

Eventually Senfl acquired a post in Munich, a place which had high musical standards, a strong need for new music, and which was relatively tolerant of those with Protestant sympathies; he was to remain there for the rest of his life. By 1540 he was ill, judging from his correspondence with Duke Albrecht, and he probably died in early 1543.

== Music and influence ==
Senfl was an eclectic composer, at home both in the worlds of sacred and secular music, and he modeled his style carefully on models provided by the Franco-Flemish composers of the previous generation, especially Josquin des Prez. In particular, he was a gifted melodist, and his lines are warmly lyrical; his music remained popular and influential in Germany through the 17th century.

His sacred music includes masses, motets, vespers settings, and a Magnificat. Technically his music has many archaic features, such as the use of cantus firmus technique, which was more in vogue in the 15th century; he even occasionally employs isorhythm. However he also has a typically Germanic liking for singable melodic passages in parallel imperfect intervals (3rds and 6ths).

Senfl also wrote numerous German lieder, most of them secular (the handful on sacred texts were written for Duke Albrecht of Prussia). They vary widely in character, from extremely simple settings of a cantus firmus to contrapuntal tours-de-force such as elaborate canons and quodlibets.

== Editions ==
A new edition of Ludwig Senfl's works is currently being prepared at the Institute of Musicology at the University of Vienna and at the Institute of Musicology and Interpretation Research at the University of Music and Performing Arts Vienna by Stefan Gasch, Scott Edwards, and Sonja Tröster; the first volume of the New Senfl Edition was published in 2021.

- Ludwig Senfl: Motets For Four Voices (A-I), ed. by Scott Lee Edwards, Stefan Gasch, Sonja Tröster (=New Senfl Edition 1 / Denkmäler der Tonkunst in Österreich, Vol. 163.1). Hollitzer, Vienna 2021, ISBN 978-3-99012-800-8

== Recordings ==
- 1983 – Musik Der Lutherzeit. Studio der Frühen Musik, capella antiqua München, Monteverdi-Chor Hamburg. Telefunken – Das Alte Werk label – 2 LP box. Contains recordings of Christ ist erstanden, O du armer Judas, Da Jesus an dem Kreuze hieng, Das G'läut zu Speyer and Ich stund an einem morgen.
- 1993 – Deutsche Lieder. Michel Piguet and the Ricercar Ensemble. 28 tracks. Capitol Records.
- 1998 – Margarete – Maximilian I. Musik um 1500. Capilla Flamenca with La Caccia, Schola Cantorum Cantate Domino Aalst, Schola Gregoriana Lovaniensis. ORF CD 265 (2 CDs). Contains a recording of Adieu mes amours by Josquin des Prez. Contains a recording of « Ach Elslein – Es taget » by Ludwig Senfl.
- 1999 – Missa Nisi Dominus. Motets. Officium, Wilfried Rombach, Christophorus
- 1999 – Senfl – Deutsche Lieder – Carmina. Susanne Rydén, Harry Geraerts, Jan Stromberg. CPO Records
- 2004 – Missa L'homme armé: Sacred Music of Ludwig Senfl. The Suspicious Cheese Lords, Clifton "Skip" West. CD
- 2004 – Ludwig Senfl - Im Maien, Lieder & Consort Music, Charles Daniels (tenor), Fretwork. Harmonia Mundi HMU907334
- 2005 – Ludwig Senfl: Lieder, Motets, Instrumental Works. Farallon Recorder Quartet. 23 tracks. Pandore Label.
- 2009 – Missa Paschalis, Motetten and Lieder. The Choir of Sidney Sussex College, Cambridge, QuinEssential, Andrew Lawrence-King (Harp), Christopher Watson (Tenor), Robert Macdonald (Bass). Directed by David Skinner. Obsidian Records.
- 2013 – Luther's Wedding Day: Kyrie and Gloria from Missa Nisi Dominus, Capella de la Torre, directed by Katharina Bäuml. Challenge Classics CD, CC 52798.
