= Heinrich Isaac =

Netherlandish composer

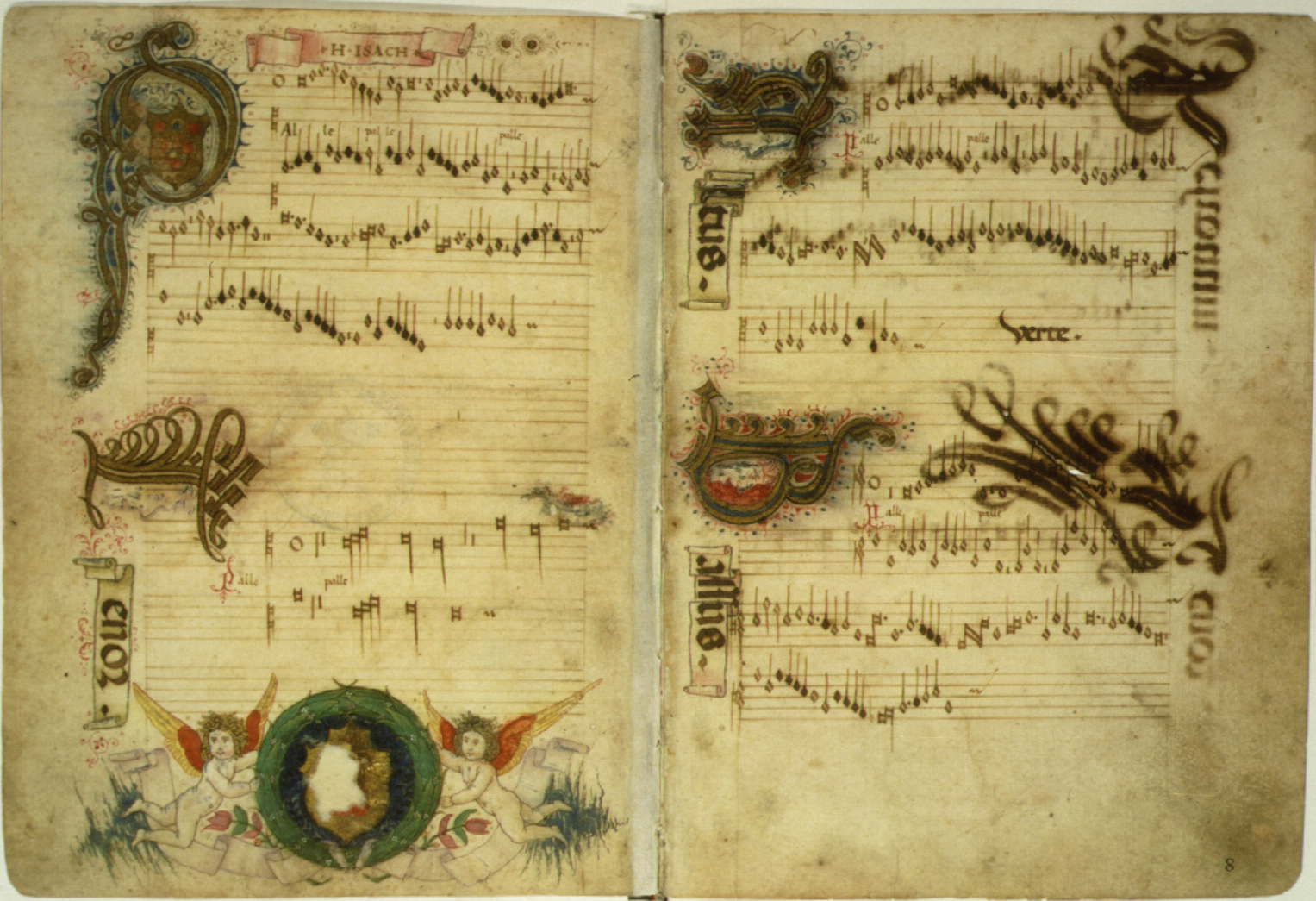
Illuminated chansonnier by Heinrich Isaac, showing the beginning of his four-voice motet Palle, palle; probably written in Florence in the 1480s and copied during that period. Palle (Italian for "balls") is a reference to the coat-of arms of the Medici family, his employers at the time.

Heinrich Isaac (ca. 1450 – 26 March 1517) was a Netherlandish composer of south Netherlandish origin during the Renaissance era. He wrote masses, motets, songs (in French, German and Italian), and instrumental music. A significant contemporary of Josquin des Prez, Isaac influenced the development of music in Germany. Several variants exist of his name: Ysaac, Ysaak, Henricus, Arrigo d'Ugo, and Arrigo il Tedesco among them. (Tedesco means "Flemish" or "German" in Italian.)

== Early life ==
Little is known about Isaac's early life (or indeed what he called himself), but it is probable that he was born in the Brabant. During the late 15th century, standards of music education in the region were excellent, and he was probably educated in his homeland, although the location is not known. Sixteenth-century Swiss music theorist and writer Heinrich Glarean claimed Isaac for Germany by dubbing him "Henricus Isaac Germanus", but in his will Isaac called himself by the patronymic "Ugonis de Flandria", 'Hugo's [son] from Flanders'. A writer in the Milanese Revista critica della letteratura italiana, June 1886, speculated that this patronymic might be connected to 'Huygens' and discovered the name "Isaacke" in the town archives of Bruges.

== Career ==
Heinrich Isaac's career spanned well over thirty years and allowed him to travel far from his homeland of Flanders into Germany, Italy, and Austria, as well as other parts of central Europe. While the absence of plentiful primary sources makes it hard for us to map out Isaac's life, piecing together the sources we do have along with the works he wrote gives us a good picture of just how popular this Franco-Flemish composer was in his time. Isaac was probably writing music by the 1470s, and the first document mentioning his name dates back to 15 September 1484, placing him in Innsbruck as a singer for Duke Sigismund of Austria, of the House of Habsburg. The following year Isaac migrated to Florence, since documents show that by July 1485 Isaac had become employed as a singer at the church Santa Maria del Fiore. By the middle of 1491, he was designated as a singer at Santissima Annunziata, a position that he held until 1493.

Several documents illustrate Isaac's long stay in Florence under the employment of Santa Maria del Fiore and Santissima Annunziata as a singer, and also suggest that he may have developed a close working-relationship with Lorenzo de' Medici. It is speculated that it was Medici who may have summoned Isaac to Florence from Innsbruck in 1484. Previously, Isaac had been identified as an organist to Lorenzo but the Isaac who served at this post is now known to have been Isaac Argyropoulos. During his presence in Florence from 1484 until the end of 1496, Isaac probably composed several masses, motets and secular songs, including missa "J'ay pris amours" and the carnival song "Hora è di Maggio". In 1487 Isaac composed the piece "A la battaglia" to commemorate the battle between Genoa and Florence for the castle Sarzanello although there is much debate over the exact date and purpose of the piece. Isaac's relationship with Lorenzo de' Medici must have been fairly close, because allegedly between 1488 and 1489 he composed the music for a play called "San Giovanni e San Paolo", written by Medici himself. Moreover, when Lorenzo died in April 1492 Isaac composed two motets in his memory. Lorenzo's son Piero inherited everything he owned, including his musical groups. In September 1492 Piero took his musical groups to Rome to perform for the coronation of Pope Alexander VI. Records show that Isaac was one of the three singers for whom clothing was purchased for the trip, implying that he probably performed for the Pope.

During his first stay in Florence Isaac also had dealings with a Florentine named Piero Bello, whose daughter Bartolomea was Isaac's wife. Although the actual date of the marriage is unknown, records imply that it may have been arranged for Isaac by Lorenzo de' Medici when he summoned Isaac from Flanders. There is record of Piero Bello giving Isaac a dowry for his daughter in January 1495.

In November 1496 after Isaac and his wife spent some time in Pisa, they moved to Vienna and became employed by Emperor Maximilian I. By the winter of 1496 Isaac and Bartolomea had gone from Pisa to Vienna to Innsbruck, and on 3 April 1497, Isaac was appointed court composer for Maximilian I. He remained under Maximilian's employment from 1496 until his death, although he did not remain stationary during that period. In fact, Isaac traveled extensively around Europe north of Italy. Payment documents from Maximilian's court imply Isaac traveled with the court to Torgau, Augsburg, Nürnberg, Wels, and back to Innsbruck between 1497 and 1501.

In 1502, Isaac returned to Italy, going to Florence to make arrangements with the hospital Santa Maria Nuova; payments were made to the hospital in return for health and food provisions. Recently discovered documents offer evidence that Isaac began making yearly payments to the confraternity of Santa Barbara for mutual assistance. On 15 August 1502, Isaac wrote his first will which included names of his proprietors, alluding to the fact that he was doing well to care for his wife and property should anything happen to him. He then traveled to Ferrara to the Este court where he wrote the motet "La mi la sol la sol la mi" in merely two days and competed with Josquin for employment: a famous letter from the agent of the Este family compared the two composers, saying that "[Isaac] is of a better disposition among his companions, and he will compose new works more often. It is true that Josquin composes better, but he composes when he wants to and not when one wants him to."

Between 1505 and 1512 there are records of Isaac having dealings in Augsburg, Florence and Constance (see Konstanz), the latter in which he compiled his largest set of works: Choralis Constantinus. This monumental collection of mass propers was commissioned by the Constance cathedral on 14 April 1508 and completed by Isaac and his student Ludwig Senfl by the winter of 1509. Isaac and Bartolomea were almost definitely back in Florence by this time since the completed Choralis Constantinus had to be mailed to the cathedral.

On 4 January 1512 Isaac bartered his house in Florence for a smaller one, signifying his settling down. He and his wife probably remained there except for a few short trips until his death. Isaac also made a point to revise his will on 24 November 1512 in which he requested that a mass be said every year forever at Santissima Annunziata or another church should Annunziata be unable. Bartolomea would be able to pay for these masses with provisions. On the recommendation of Pope Leo X and of his brother Giuliano de' Medici, he was given an honorary position as chief of the Chapel of Polyphonic Music at Santa Maria del Fiore on 30 May 1514, which served as a pension. Isaac also continued to receive payments from the court of Maximilian I regardless of his living in Florence. In December 1515, Pope Leo X made a visit to Florence, where he almost certainly would have heard Isaac's music performed. Shortly before his death, Isaac wrote a third and final will, which shortened his previous request to instead have a commemorative mass said every year for ten years. Isaac died on 26 March 1517. Santissima Annunziata received payment the following day to hold his funeral. A last posthumous donation was made to the confraternity of Santa Barbara in the amount of five florins, which was equal to one quarter the value of Isaac's home. Bartolomea survived her husband by just over seventeen years and died on 30 May 1534.

== Compositions ==
Isaac was one of the most prolific composers of the time, producing an extraordinarily diverse output, including almost all the forms and styles current at the time; only Lassus, at the end of the 16th century, had a wider overall range. Music composed by Isaac included masses, motets, songs in French, German, and Italian, as well as instrumental music. His best known work may be the song "Innsbruck, ich muss dich lassen", of which he made at least two versions. It is possible, however, that the melody itself is not by Isaac, and only the setting is original. The same melody was later used as the theme for the Lutheran hymn "O Welt, ich muss dich lassen", which was the basis of works by Johann Sebastian Bach, including his St Matthew Passion and Johannes Brahms.

Of his settings of the ordinary of the mass, 36 survive; others are believed to have been lost. Numerous individual movements of masses survive as well. But it is composition of music for the Proper of the Mass – the portion of the liturgy which changed on different days, unlike the ordinary, which remained constant – which gave him his greatest fame. The huge cycle of motets which he wrote for the mass Proper, the Choralis Constantinus, and which he left incomplete at his death, would have supplied music for 100 separate days of the year.

Isaac is held in high regard for his Choralis Constantinus. It is a huge anthology of over 450 chant-based polyphonic motets for the Proper of the Mass. It had its origins in a commission that Isaac received from the Cathedral in Konstanz, Germany in April 1508 to set many of the Propers unique to the local liturgy. Isaac was in Konstanz because Maximilian had called a meeting of the Reichstag (German Parliament of nobles) there and Isaac was on hand to provide music for the Imperial court chapel choir. After the deaths of both Maximilian and Isaac, Ludwig Senfl, who had been Isaac's pupil as a member of the Imperial court choir, gathered all the Isaac settings of the Proper and placed them into liturgical order for the church year. But the anthology was not published until 1555, after Senfl's death, by which time the reforms of the Council of Trent had made many of the texts obsolete. The motets remain some of the finest examples of chant-based Renaissance polyphony in existence.

Isaac composed a 6-voice motet Angeli Archangeli for the Feast of All Saint's Day, honoring angels, archangels, and all other saints. Another famous motet by Isaac is Optime pastor (Optime divino), written for the accession to the papacy of Medici pope Leo X. This motet compares the Pope to a shepherd capable of soothing all of his flock and binding them together.

While in the service of the Medici in Florence, Isaac wrote a lament on the death of Lorenzo de' Medici, Quis dabit capiti meo aquam (1492), which set words by Lorenzo's favorite poet, Angelo Poliziano.

== Influence ==
The influence of Isaac was especially pronounced in Germany, due to the connection he maintained with the Habsburg court. He was the first significant master of the Franco-Flemish polyphonic style who both lived in German-speaking areas, and whose music was widely distributed there. It was through him that the polyphonic style of the Netherlands became widely accepted in Germany, making possible the further development of contrapuntal music there. The Austrian serialist composer Anton Webern (1883–1945) gained his PhD on Isaac's Choralis Constantinus, with Prof. Guido Adler, the doyen of musicology in Austria and Germany.

== See also ==
- Virgo Prudentissima (Heinrich Isaac)
- Innsbruck, ich muss dich lassen
- Choralis Constantinus
- Ludwig Senfl

== Media ==
- Innsbruck, ich muss dich lassen (MIDI sequence)
