= List of Renaissance composers =

Renaissance music flourished in Europe during the 15th and 16th centuries. The second major period of Western classical music, the lives of Renaissance composers are much better known than earlier composers, with even letters surviving between composers. Renaissance music saw the introduction of written instrumental music, although vocal works still reigned in popularity. There is no strict division between period, so many later medieval and earlier Baroque composers appear here as well.

== Renaissance composers ==
Renaissance composers
Name	Lifetime	Nationality	Works and remarks	Ref.
Zacara da Teramo	1350/60 – 1413/16	Italian		
Paolo da Firenze (a.k.a. Paolo Tenorista)	c. 1355 – c. 1436	Italian		
Nikola the Serb	fl. late 14th century	Serbian		
Hugo von Montfort	1357 – 1423	German		
Giovanni Mazzuoli	1360 – 1426	Italian	Also known as Jovannes de Florentia, Giovanni degli Organi and Giovanni di Niccol	
Pycard	fl. c. 1390-after c. 1410	English	Has works preserved in the first layer of the Old Hall Manuscript and elsewhere. His identity is unclear; probably English, but possibly from France.	
Johannes Tapissier (Jean de Noyers)	c. 1370 – before 1410	French		
Leonel Power	c. 1370 – 1445	English		
Grazioso da Padova	fl. 1390?–1407	Italian	Also known as Gratiosus de Padua	
Antonio da Cividale	fl. 1392–1421	Italian	Also known as Antonius de Civitate Austrie	
Nicolas Grenon	c. 1375 – 1456	French		
Oswald von Wolkenstein	1376/77 – 1445	German		
Andrea Stefani	c. 1375 - 1460	Italian	Member of the Order of Bianchi Gesuati	
Matteo da Perugia	fl. 1400–1416	Italian		
Antonius Romanus	fl. 1400–1432	Italian		
Pierre Fontaine	c. 1380 – c. 1450	French		
Mikołaj Radomski	1380 – 15th century	Polish		
Thomas Fabri	1380 – 1420	Franco-Flemish		
Baude Cordier	c. 1380 – before 1440	French		
Ugolino da Forlì	1380 – 1457	Italian	Also known as Ugolino da Orvieto	
Nicolaus Ricii de Nucella Campli	died after 1436, fl. 1401–1420	Italian		
Guillaume Legrant (Lemarcherier)	fl. 1405-after 1449	French		
Jacobus Vide	fl. 1405?-after 1433	Franco-Flemish		
Beltrame Feragut	c. 1385 – c. 1450	French	Also known as Bertrand di Vignone	
Bartolomeo da Bologna	fl. 1405–1427	Italian		
Johannes Cesaris	fl. c. 1406–1417	French		
Roy Henry	fl. 1410-after 1410	English	Very likely to be Henry V of England (1387–1422)	
Johannes de Limburgia	fl. 1408–1431	Franco-Flemish	Also spelled Lymburgia; also called Johannes Vinandi	
John Dunstaple (or Dunstable)	c. 1390 – 1453	English		
Byttering possibly Thomas Byttering	fl. c. 1410-after 1420	English		
Guillaume Dufay (Guillaume Du Fay)	1397 – 1474	French		
Estienne Grossin	fl. 1418–1421	French		
Johannes Brassart	c. 1400 – 1455	Burgundian		
Nicolaus Zacharie	c. 1400 or before – 1466	Italian		
Johannes Cornago	c. 1400 – after 1475	Spanish		
Gilles Binchois (Gilles de Bins)	c. 1400 – 1460	Burgundian		
Richard Loqueville	died 1418	French		
Adam	fl. c. 1420-1430	French		
G. Dupoitt	fl. c. 1420-1430	French		
Acourt	fl. first half of the 15th century	French		
Arnold de Lantins	fl. 1423-1431/1432	Franco-Flemish	especially active in German-speaking areas during the early Reformation period	
Conrad Paumann	c. 1410 – 1473	German		
Johannes de Quadris	c. 1410 – ? 1457	Italian		
John Plummer	c. 1410 – c. 1483	English		
Johannes Ockeghem	c. 1410 – 1497	Franco-Flemish		
Clement Liebert	fl. 1433–1454	Franco-Flemish		
Johannes Fedé	c. 1415 – 1477?	French		
Henry Abyngdon	c. 1418 – 1497	English		
Guglielmo Ebreo da Pesaro	c. 1420 – 1484	Italian	Dance master	
Johannes Legrant	fl. c. 1420-after 1440	French		
Hugo de Lantins	fl. c. 1420-after 1430	Franco-Flemish		
Biquardus	fl. 1440–1450	French		
Gilles Joye	1424/1425 – 1483	Franco-Flemish		
Reginaldus Libert	fl. c. 1425-after 1435	French		
Jean Cousin	before 1425 – after 1475	French		
Petrus de Domarto	fl. c. 1445–1455	Franco-Flemish		
Johannes Regis	c. 1425 – c. 1496	Franco-Flemish		
Johannes Pullois	died 1478	Franco-Flemish	Active in the Low Countries and Italy	
Juan de Urrede	c. 1430 – after 1482	Spanish	Or Johannes de Wreede	
John Hothby Johannes Ottobi	c. 1430 – 1487	English	English theorist and composer mainly active in Italy.	
Robert Morton	c. 1430 – 1479	English-Burgundian		
Antoine Busnois	c. 1430 – 1492	French		
William Hawte William Haute	c. 1430 – 1497	English		
Antonio Cornazzano	c. 1430 – 1484	Italian	Dancing master	
Guillaume le Rouge	fl. 1450-after 1465	Franco-Flemish		
Walter Frye	fl. c. 1450-1474	English		
William Horwood	c. 1430 – 1484	English	Some of his music is collected in the Eton Choirbook.	
Eloy d'Amerval	fl. 1455–1508	French		
Johannes Tinctoris	c. 1435 – 1511	Franco-Flemish		
Richard Hygons	c. 1435 – c. 1509	English		
Adrien Basin	fl. 1457-after 1498	Franco-Flemish		
Nycasius de Clibano	fl. 1457–1497	Franco-Flemish		
Johannes Martini	c. 1440 – 1497/98	Franco-Flemish		
Juan de Triana	fl. c. 1460–1500	Spanish		
Antonius Janue	fl. 1460	Italian		
Firminus Caron	fl. c. 1460–c. 1475	French		
Juan Pérez de Gijón	fl. c. 1460–1500	Spanish		
Guillaume Faugues	fl. c. 1460–1475	French		
Heinrich Finck	1444/1445 – 1527	German		
Jan z Lublina	late 15th century – 1540	Polish		
Gilbert Banester	c. 1445 – 1487	English		
Alexander Agricola	1445/1446 – 1506	Franco-Flemish		
Johannes de Stokem	c. 1445 – 1487 or 1501	Franco-Flemish		
Adam von Fulda	c. 1445 – 1505	German		
Gaspar van Weerbeke	c. 1445 – after 1516	Franco-Flemish		
Isaiah the Serb	fl. later 15th century	Serbian		
Hayne van Ghizeghem	c. 1445 – after 1476	Franco-Flemish		
Jehan Fresneau	fl. 1468–1505	French		
Philippe Basiron	c. 1449 – 1491	French		
Colinet de Lannoy	died before 1497	French		
Abertijne Malcourt	c. 1450 – c. 1510	Franco-Flemish		
Edmund Turges (possibly the same as Edmund Sturges)	1450 – 1500	English	Has a number of works preserved in the Eton Choirbook; at least three Magnificat settings and two masses have been lost.	
Robert Wilkinson	c. 1450 – after 1515	English		
Walter Lambe	c. 1450 – after 1504	English	Major contributor to the Eton Choirbook.	
Matthaeus Pipelare	c. 1450 – c. 1515	Franco-Flemish		
Arnolt Schlick	c. 1450 – c. 1525	German		
Loyset Compère	c. 1450 – 1518	French		
Gilles Mureau	c. 1450 – 1512	French		
Hans Judenkünig	c. 1450 – 1526	German	Or Judenkönig	
Heinrich Isaac	c. 1450 – 1517	Franco-Flemish		
Josquin des Prez	c. 1450 – 1521	Franco-Flemish		
Franchinus Gaffurius	1451 – 1522	Italian		
Jean Japart	fl. 1474–1481	Franco-Flemish	Active in Italy	
Edmund Sturton	fl. late 15th – early 16th century	English	Presumably identical with the Sturton who composed the six-part Ave Maria ancilla Trinitatis in the Lambeth Choirbook, he contributed a Gaude virgo mater Christi to the Eton Choirbook, the six voices of which cover a fifteen-note range	
Robert de Févin	fl. late 15th–early 16th century	French	Brother of Antoine de Févin	
Jacobus Barbireau	1455 – 1491	Franco-Flemish		
Robert Hacomplaynt	c. 1456 – 1528	English	Has a single surviving work, a setting of Salve regina, in the Eton Choirbook; a work known as Haycomplayne's Gaude, dated 1529, has been lost	
Jacob Obrecht	1457/58 – 1505	Franco-Flemish		
Jean Braconnier	died 1512, fl. from 1478	French	Also known as Lourdault	
Jean Mouton	c. 1459 – 1522	French		
Paul Hofhaimer	1459 – 1537	German		
Jheronimus de Clibano	c. 1459 – 1503	Franco-Flemish		
Pierre de La Rue	c. 1460 – 1518	Franco-Flemish	Most famous composer of the Grande chapelle of the Habsburg court	
Marbrianus de Orto	c. 1460 – 1529	Franco-Flemish		
Johannes Prioris	c. 1460? – c. 1514	Franco-Flemish		
Antoine Brumel	c. 1460 – 1512/1513	French		
Juan de Anchieta	1462 – 1523	Spanish		
Francisco de la Torre	fl. 1483–1504	Spanish		
Robert Fayrfax	1464 – 1521	English		
Sebastian Virdung	born c. 1465	German		
Pedro de Escobar	c. 1465 – after 1535	Portuguese		
Richard Davy	c. 1465 – c. 1507	English	Major contributor to the Eton Choirbook	
Giacomo Fogliano	1468 – 10 April 1548	Italian		
William Cornysh the younger	c. 1468 – 1523	English	Probably the son of William Cornysh the elder	
Juan del Encina	1468 – c. 1529	Spanish		
John Browne	fl. c. 1490	English	Major contributor to the Eton Choirbook	
Pierrequin de Thérache	c. 1470 – 1528	French	Active in Lorraine	
Robert Johnson	c. 1470 – after 1554	Scottish		
Francisco de Peñalosa	c. 1470 – 1528	Spanish		
Antoine de Févin	c. 1470 – 1511/12	French	Brother of Robert de Févin	
Bartolomeo Tromboncino	c. 1470 – c. 1535	Italian		
Marchetto Cara	c. 1470 – 1525?	Italian		
Mathurin Forestier	c. 1470 – 1535	French		
Antonius Divitis	c. 1470 – c. 1530	Franco-Flemish		
Pierre Alamire	c. 1470 – 1536	German	Active in the Low Countries	
Richard Sampson	c. 1470 – 1554	English		
Carpentras	c. 1470 – 1548	French		
Johannes Ghiselin	fl. 1491–1507	Franco-Flemish		
Bartolomeo degli Organi	1474 – 1539	Italian		
Vincenzo Capirola	1474 – after 1548	Italian		
Robert Cowper	c. 1474 – 1535/1540	English	Represented by a work in the Gyffard partbooks and manuscript sources	
Filippo de Lurano	c. 1475 – c. 1520	Italian		
Philippe Verdelot	c. 1475 – before 1552	French	Active in Italy	
Nicolas Champion	c. 1475 – 1533	Franco-Flemish		
Andreas De Silva	c. 1475/1480 – after 1520	Spanish		
Thomas Ashewell	c. 1478 – after 1513	English		
Antoine de Longueval	fl. 1498–1525	French		
Andrea Antico da Montona	c. 1480 – after 1538	Italian		
Hugh Kellyk	late 15th century – 16th century?	English	has two surviving pieces, a five-part Magnificat and a seven-part Gaude flore virginali, in the Eton Choirbook.	
Thomas Stoltzer	c. 1480 – 1526	German		
Noel Bauldeweyn	c. 1480 – after 1513	Franco-Flemish		
Jean Richafort	c. 1480 – 1547	Franco-Flemish		
Benedictus Appenzeller	1480 to 1488 – after 1558	Franco-Flemish	Served Mary, Queen of Hungary for most of his career	
Jean l'Héritier	c. 1480 – after 1551	French		
Francesco Spinacino	late 15th century – after 1507	Italian		
Marco Dall'Aquila	c. 1480 – after 1538	Italian		
Jacotin	died 1529	Franco-Flemish	Also called Jacob Godebrye	
Gregoire	fl. c. 1500–1504	French		
Ninot le Petit	fl. c. 1500–1520	French		
Gilles Reingot	fl. 1501–1530	Franco-Flemish		
Mateo Flecha the Elder	1481 – 1553	Spanish	Or Mateu Fletxa el Vell	
Hans Buchner	1483 – 1538	German		
Jacquet of Mantua	1483 – 1559	French		
Martin Luther	1483 – 1546	German		
Hans Kotter	c. 1485 – 1541	German		
Mikołaj z Chrzanowa	1485 – 1555	Polish		
Clément Janequin	c. 1485 – 1558	French		
Maistre Jhan	c. 1485 – 1538	Italian	Early madrigalist, active at Ferrara	
Hugh Aston	c. 1485 – 1558	English		
Robert Carver	1485 – 1570	Scottish	Wrote a mass on L'Homme armé (the only known by a British composer) and a nineteen-part O bone jesu	
Nicholas Ludford	c. 1485 – 1557	English		
Pierre Moulu	c. 1485 – c. 1550	Franco-Flemish	Active in France	
Ludwig Senfl	c. 1486 – 1543	Swiss	Active in Germany	
John Redford	c. 1486 – 1547	English	One of the main contributors to The Mulliner Book	
Martin Agricola	1486 – 1556	German		
Thomas Appleby	c. 1488 – 1563	English		
Georg Rhau	1488 – 1548	German		
Joan Ambrosio Dalza	fl. 1508	Italian		
Gasparo Alberti	c. 1489 – 1560	Italian		
Pierre Passereau	fl. 1509–1547	Franco-Flemish	Popular composer of chansons in the 1530s	
Franciscus Bossinensis	fl. 1509–1511	Italian		
Arnold von Bruck	c. 1490 – 1554	Franco-Flemish-German		
John Taverner	c. 1490 – 1545	English		
Sebastian z Felsztyna	c. 1490 – 1543	Polish	Also known as Sebastian Herburt	
Fridolin Sicher	1490 – 1546	Swiss		
Sandrin	c. 1490 – c. 1560	French	Also known as Pierre Regnault	
Claudin de Sermisy	c. 1490 – 1562	French		
Adrian Willaert	c. 1490 – 1562	Franco-Flemish	founder of the Venetian School; active in Italy; influential as a teacher as well as a composer	
Bernardo Pisano	1490 – 1548	Italian	Possibly the earliest composer of madrigals, though not in name	
Sebastiano Festa	1490/1495 – 1524	Italian	Early composer of madrigals; possibly related to Costanzo Festa	
Marco Antonio Cavazzoni	c. 1490 – c. 1560	Italian		
Henry VIII of England	1491 – 1547	English		
Francesco de Layolle	1492 – c. 1540	Italian	In the employ of the Medici; music teacher to sculptor Benvenuto Cellini	
Lupus Hellinck	c. 1494 – 1541	Franco-Flemish		
Pierre Attaingnant	c. 1494 – 1551/1552	French	Best known as a printer, especially of Parisian chansons	
Leonhard Kleber	c. 1495 – 1556	German		
Pierre Vermont	c. 1495 – between 1527–33	French		
Lorenz Lemlin	c. 1495 – c. 1549	German		
Ondřej Chrysoponus Jevíčský	1495 – 1592	Czech		
Leonhard Päminger	1495 – 1567	German		
Nicolas Gombert	c. 1495 – c. 1560	Franco-Flemish	prominent contrapuntist of generation after Josquin; worked for Charles V, Holy Roman Emperor	
Costanzo Festa	c. 1495 – 1545	Italian	Early composer of madrigals; member of Sistine Chapel choir	
Johann Walter	1496 – 1570	German		
Francesco Canova da Milano	1497 – 1543	Italian		
Mattio Rampollini	1497 – c. 1553	Italian		
Hans Gerle	c. 1498 – 1570	German		
Adrianus Petit Coclico	1499 – after 1562	Franco-Flemish		
Luis de Milán	c. 1500 – after 1561	Spanish		
Juan Vásquez	c. 1500 – c. 1560	Spanish		
Enríquez de Valderrábano	1500 – after 1557	Spanish		
Albert de Rippe	c. 1500 – 1551	Italian		
Luis de Narváez	c. 1500 – between 1550–60	Spanish		
Cristóbal de Morales	c. 1500 – 1553	Spanish		
Jacques Buus	c. 1500 – 1565	Franco-Flemish	Active at Venice, and assisted in the development of the instrumental ricercar	
Bartolomeo Trosylho	c. 1500 – c. 1567	Portuguese		
Philip van Wilder	1500 – 1554	Franco-Flemish	Active in England	
Cornelius Canis	c. 1500 to 1510 – 1561	Franco-Flemish	Music director for Charles V, Holy Roman Emperor, in the 1540s and 1550s, after Nicolas Gombert	
Heliodoro de Paiva	c. 1500 – 1552	Portuguese		
Nicolaus Cracoviensis	died c. 1550	Polish	Also known as Mikołaj z Krakowa	
Miguel de Fuenllana	1500 – 1578	Spanish		
Hilaire Penet	? 1501 – 15??	French		
Francesco Corteccia	1502 – 1571	Italian		
Damião de Góis	1502 – 1574	Portuguese		
Jacquet de Berchem	c. 1505 – before 1567	Franco-Flemish	Early madrigalist	
Bartolomé de Escobedo	c. 1505 – 1563	Spanish		
Thomas Tallis	c. 1505 – 1585	English		
Thomas Crecquillon	c. 1505 – 1557	Franco-Flemish	A member of Charles V's imperial chapel	
Christopher Tye	c. 1505 – ? 1572	English		
Jean de Latre	c. 1505/1510 – 1569	Franco-Flemish		
Ambrose Lupo	1505 – 1591	Italian	Also known as Ambrosio Lupo, de Almaliach and Lupus Italus; active in England	
Johannes Lupi	c. 1506 – 1539	Franco-Flemish		
Jan Simonides Montanus	1507 – 1587	Czech	Active in Kutná Hora	
Bálint Bakfark	1507 – 1576	Hungarian		
Jacques Arcadelt	c. 1507 – 1568	Franco-Flemish	Most famous of the early madrigalists	
Paolo Aretino	1508 – 1584	Italian	Also known as Paolo Antonio del Bivi	
Alfonso dalla Viola	c. 1508 – c. 1573	Italian	Rore Also an instrumentalist; active in Ferrara	
Hans Neusiedler	1508 – 1563	German		
Antonio Gardano	1509 – 1569	Italian	Music printer	
Guillaume Morlaye	c. 1510 – c. 1558	French		
Loys Bourgeois	c. 1510 – 1560	French		
Claudio Veggio	c. 1510 – 15??	Italian		
Alonso Mudarra	c. 1510 – 1580	Spanish		
Tielman Susato	c. 1510/15 – after 1570	Franco-Flemish	Also spelled Tylman; was also an influential music publisher	
Luis Venegas de Henestrosa	c. 1510 – 1570	Spanish		
Diego Ortiz	c. 1510 – c. 1570	Spanish		
Antonio de Cabezón	c. 1510 – 1566	Spanish		
Juan Bermudo	c. 1510 – c. 1565	Spanish		
Jan Nasco	c. 1510 – 1561	Franco-Flemish	Active in northern Italy	
Pierre Certon	1510/1520 – 1572	French		
Pierre de Manchicourt	c. 1510 – 1564	Franco-Flemish	Active in Spain	
Vincenzo Ruffo	c. 1510 – 1587	Italian		
Guillaume Le Heurteur	fl. 1530–1545	French		
Sebestyén Tinódi	c. 1510 – 1556	Hungarian		
John Merbecke	c. 1510 – c. 1585	English	Produced the first musical setting for the English liturgy, publishing The Booke of Common Praier Noted, 1549; surviving works include a Missa Per arma iustitie; almost burnt as a heretic in 1543	
Dominique Phinot	c. 1510 – c. 1556	Franco-Flemish	active in Italy and southern France	
Jacob Clemens non Papa	c. 1510/1515 – c. 1555	Franco-Flemish	Also known as Jacques Clément	
Luigi Dentice	c. 1510? – 1566	Italian		
Georg Forster	c. 1510 – 1568	German		
Jean Courtois	fl. 1530–1545	Franco-Flemish		
David Peebles	fl. c. 1530–1579	Scottish		
Jean Maillard	c. 1510 – c. 1570	French		
Ghiselin Danckerts	c. 1510 – after 1565	Dutch	Active in Rome	
Nicola Vicentino	c. 1511 – 1575/1576	Italian		
Osbert Parsley	1511 – 1585	English	Also spelled Parsely; wrote a set of Lamentations for Holy Week	
Jean Guyot de Châtelet	c. 1512 – 1588	French		
Nicolas Payen	c. 1512 – c. 1559	Franco-Flemish	Maestro di capilla for Philip II of Spain after Cornelius Canis	
Domenico Ferrabosco	1513 – 1574	Italian	Madrigalist; father of Alfonso Ferrabosco	
Hubert Naich	c. 1513 – c. 1546	Franco-Flemish	active in Rome	
Nicolao Dorati	c. 1513 – 1593	Italian	Also a trombonist; active at Lucca	
Claude Goudimel	c. 1514/1520 – 1572	French		
John Sheppard	c. 1515 – 1559	English		
Cypriano de Rore	c. 1515 – 1565	Franco-Flemish		
Caspar Othmayr	1515 – 1553	German		
Josquin Baston	c. 1515 – c. 1576	Dutch		
Giandomenico Martoretta	c. 1515 – 1560s	Italian	Calabrian madrigalist, active in Sicily	
Tomás de Santa María	c. 1515 – 1570	Spanish		
Giovanni Domenico da Nola	c. 1515 – 1592	Italian		
Jheronimus Vinders	fl. 1525–1526	Franco-Flemish	Active at Ghent; influenced by Josquin	
Gioseffo Zarlino	1517 – 1590	Italian		
Hubert Waelrant	c. 1517 – 1595	Franco-Flemish		
Francesco Viola	died 1568	Italian	Maestro di cappella at Ferrara after	
Francesco Cellavenia	fl. 1538–1563	Italian		
Pierre Cadéac	fl. 1538–1556	French		
Francisco Leontaritis	1518 – 1572	Greek		
Thoinot Arbeau	1519 – 1595	French		
Giulio Fiesco	born 1519?, fl. 1550–1570	Italian	Madrigalist, active at Ferrara	
Pierre Clereau	fl. 1539–1570	French		
Giovanni Paolo Paladini	fl. c. 1540–1560	Italian		
Edward Kyrton	fl. 1540 to 1550	English	Miserere for keyboard in a British Museum MS	
Hoste da Reggio	c. 1520 – 1569	Italian	Madrigalist, active at Milan and Bergamo	
John Black	c. 1520 – 1587	English		
António Carreira	c. 1520 to 1530 – 1597	Portuguese		
Firmin Lebel	early 16th century – 1573	French	Active in Rome	
Wacław z Szamotuł	c. 1520 – c. 1560	Polish		
Severin Cornet	c. 1520 – 1582	Franco-Flemish		
Adrian Le Roy	c. 1520 – 1598	French		
Lambert Courtois	c. 1520 – after 1583	French	Active at Cambrai	
Didier Lupi Second	c. 1520 – after 1559	French		
Sigmund Hemmel	c. 1520 – 1565	German		
Francesco Portinaro	c. 1520 – after 1577	Italian	Madrigalist, native of Padua	
Vincenzo Galilei	c. 1520 – 1591	Italian	Father of composer Michelagnolo Galilei and astronomer and physicist Galileo Galilei	
Thomas Caustun	c. 1520/1525 – 1569	English		
Joan Brudieu	c. 1520 – 1591	Spanish		
Perissone Cambio	c. 1520 – c. 1562	Franco-Flemish		
Giovanni Animuccia	c. 1520 – 1571	Italian		
Philippe de Monte	1521 – 1603	Franco-Flemish	Prolific composer of madrigals	
Jan Blahoslav	1523 – 1571	Czech		
Girolamo Parabosco	c. 1524 – 1577	Italian	Minor member of the Venetian School	
Simon Boyleau	fl. c. 1544–after 1586	French		
Jean de Bonmarché	c. 1525 – 1570	Franco-Flemish		
Giovanni Pierluigi da Palestrina	c. 1525 – 1594	Italian		
Baldassare Donato	1525/1530 – 1603	Italian		
Girolamo Cavazzoni	c. 1525 – after 1577	Italian		
Claude Gervaise	1525 – 1583	French		
John Blitheman	c. 1525 – 1591	English		
Richard Edwardes	1525 – 1566	English		
Rodrigo de Ceballos	c. 1525 – 1581	Spanish		
Ebran	c. 1543 – c. 1564	French	Also given as Abran, Abrahan, Ebram, Hebran	
Antonino Barges	fl. 1546–1565	Franco-Flemish	Active in Italy	
Ippolito Ciera	fl. 1546–1564	Italian	Minor madrigalist, active at Treviso; follower of Willaert	
Hermann Finck	1527 – 1558	German		
Annibale Padovano	1527 – 1575	Italian		
Thomas Whythorne	1528 – 1595	English		
Francisco Guerrero	1528 – 1599	Spanish		
Jiří Rychnovský	1529 – 1616	Czech		
William Mundy	1529 – 1591	English	Father of John Mundy; his output includes fine examples of both the large-scale Latin votive antiphon and the short English anthem, as well as Masses and Latin psalm settings; his style is vigorous and eloquent; represented in The Mulliner Book and in the Gyffard partbooks	
Costanzo Porta	c. 1529 – 1601	Italian		
Jacobus Vaet	c. 1529 – 1567	Franco-Flemish		
Guillaume Costeley	c. 1530 – 1606	French		
Thomas Preston	died c. 1563	English	Composed 12 Offertory settings for keyboard, including the popular Felix namque, and an alternatim organ Mass for Easter, containing the only known sequence setting of the time; his keyboard writing is extremely virtuosic for the period	
Elias Nikolaus Ammerbach	c. 1530 – 1597	German		
Teodora Ginés	c. 1530 – 1598	Cuban		
Vicente Lusitano	died after 1561, fl. 1550	Portuguese		
Anthoine de Bertrand	c. 1530/1540 – c. 1581	French		
Guillaume Boni	c. 1530 – 1594	French		
Agostino Agostini	died 1569	Italian	Father of Lodovico Agostini	
Giorgio Mainerio	c. 1530/1540 – 1582	Italian		
Fabritio Caroso	c. 1530 – after 1600	Italian		
Claude Le Jeune	1530 – 1600	French		
Simon Bar Jona Madelka	c. 1530 – 1550-c. 1598	Czech		
Nicolas de La Grotte	1530 – c. 1600	French		
Cornelis Symonszoon Boscoop	before 1531 – 1573	Dutch		
Jacobus de Kerle	1531/1532 – 1591	Franco-Flemish		
Hernando Franco	1532 – 1585	Spanish	Active in Guatemala and Mexico	
Orlande de Lassus	c. 1532 – 1594	Franco-Flemish		
Andrea Gabrieli	1532/1533 – 1585	Italian	Uncle of Giovanni Gabrieli	
Gianmatteo Asola	c. 1532 – 1609	Italian		
Claudio Merulo	1533 – 1604	Italian		
Simon Moreau	fl. 1553–1558	Franco-Flemish		
Francesco Soto de Langa	1534 – 1619	Italian		
Lodovico Agostini	1534 – 1590	Italian	Illegitimate son of Agostino Agostini	
Pietro Taglia	fl. c. 1555–1565	Italian	Madrigalist in Milan; follower of Cipriano de Rore	
Robert Parsons	c. 1535 – 1572	English	Latin music includes antiphons, Credo quod redemptor, Domine quis habitabit, Magnificat and Jam Christus astra; also three responds from the Office of the Dead, songs (including Pandolpho), In nomine settings for ensemble, and a galliard	
Ippolito Chamaterò	1535/1540 – after 1592	Italian	Active in several cities in northern Italy; composed both sacred and secular music	
Marc'Antonio Ingegneri	1535/1536 – 1592	Italian	Madrigalist and teacher of Monteverdi; active at Cremona	
Pietro Vinci	c. 1535 – 1584	Italian	Madrigalist; founder of the Sicilian school	
Rocco Rodio	c. 1535 – after 1615	Italian		
Cyprian Bazylik	c. 1535 – c. 1600	Polish		
Annibale Stabile	c. 1535 – 1595	Italian		
Mikołaj Gomółka	c. 1535 – c. 1609	Polish		
Giaches de Wert	1535 – 1596	Franco-Flemish	Active in Italy	
Cesare Negri	1535 – 1605	Italian	Dance master	
Filippo Azzaiolo	fl. 1557–1569	Italian		
Annibale Zoilo	c. 1537 – 1592	Italian		
Jehan Chardavoine	1537 – 1580	French		
Paschal de l'Estocart	1538/1539 – after 1584	French		
Robert White	1538 – 1574	English		
Stefano Felis	c. 1538? – 1603	Italian		
Johannes Matelart	before 1538 – 1607	Franco-Flemish		
Nicolas Millot	fl. 1559–1590 or later	French		
Fabrizio Dentice	1539? – 1581	Italian		
Alessandro Striggio	c. 1540 – 1592	Italian	Musician to the Medici; composer of the colossal 60-voice Missa sopra Ecco sì beato giorno	
Stefano Rossetto	fl. 1560–1580	Italian	Active in Italy and Germany	
Nicholas Strogers	fl. 1560–1575	English	Also spelled Strowger, Strowgers; three (probably four) keyboard pieces in a Christ Church, Oxford, manuscript, and a Fantasia in the Fitzwilliam Virginal Book (No. 89); an In nomine exists in a Bodleian manuscript	
Giovanni Dragoni	c. 1540 – 1598	Italian		
Jacob Regnart	1540s – 1599	Franco-Flemish		
Vincenzo Bellavere	c. 1540/1541 – 1587	Italian		
Jhan Gero	fl. 1540–1555	Franco-Flemish	Active in Venice, Italy	
Marcin Leopolita	c. 1540 – c. 1584	Polish	Also known as Marcin ze Lwowa	
William Byrd	c. 1540 – 1623	English		
Maddalena Casulana	c. 1540 – c. 1590	Italian		
Clement Woodcock	1540 – 1590	English	Also spelled Woodcoke, Woodecock; his Browning my dear is one of several pieces of the period based on a popular tune, also known as The leaves be green	
Giovanni Ferretti	c. 1540 – after 1609	Italian		
Matthäus Waissel	c. 1540 – 1602	German		
Francesco Rovigo	1540/1541 – 1597	Italian	Composed liturgical music and madrigals; active at Mantua and Graz	
Hernando de Cabezón	1541 – 1602	Spanish		
Andreas Pevernage	1542/3 – 1591	Franco-Flemish		
Gioseffo Guami	1542 – 1611	Italian	Also known as Gioseffo da Lucca	
Giovanni Maria Nanino	1543/1544 – 1607	Italian	Also spelled Nanini; brother of Giovanni Bernardino Nanino	
Alfonso Ferrabosco the elder	1543 – 1588	Italian	Active in England	
Ascanio Trombetti	1544 – 1590	Italian		
Antonio Valente	fl. 1565–1580	Italian		
Jan Rijspoort	fl. late 16th century	Franco-Flemish	Flemish composer in the Spanish Netherlands	
Anthony Holborne	c. 1545 – 1602	English		
Gioseppe Caimo	c. 1545 – 1584	Italian	Active at Milan; madrigalist and organist	
John Johnson	c. 1545 – 1594	English		
Ginés de Boluda	c. 1545 – c. 1606	Spanish		
Jakub Polak	c. 1545 – 1605	Polish	Also known as Jacob Polonais, Jakub Reys, Jacques le Polonois and Jacob de Reis; active in France	
Luzzasco Luzzaschi	c. 1545 – 1607	Italian	Late madrigalist at Ferrara	
Bernardo Clavijo del Castillo	1545 – 1626	Spanish	Active in Palermo, Sicily and later in Salamanca; published motets in 1588	
Joachim Thibault de Courville	died 1581, fl. from c. 1567	French		
Manuel Mendes	c. 1547 – 1605	Portuguese		
Massimo Troiano	died after 1570, fl. 1567 to 1570	Italian		
Balduin Hoyoul	1547/8 – 1594	Franco-Flemish	Active in Stuttgart and Munich	
George de La Hèle	1547 – 1586	Franco-Flemish	Active in the Habsburg chapels of Spain and the Low Countries	
Girolamo Dalla Casa	died 1601, fl. from 1568	Italian		
Francesco Soriano	c. 1548 – 1621	Italian		
Ginés Pérez de la Parra	c. 1548 – 1600	Spanish		
Tomás Luis de Victoria	1548 – 1611	Spanish		
Giovanni de Macque	c. 1549 – 1614	Franco-Flemish	Active in Italy	
Eustache Du Caurroy	1549 – 1609	French		
Fabrice Caietain	fl. 1570–1578	French		
Riccardo Rognoni	c. 1550 – c. 1620	Italian		
Cesario Gussago	c. 1550 – 1612	Italian		
Orazio Vecchi	1550 – 1605	Italian		
Pomponio Nenna	c. 1550 – 1613	Italian		
Ippolito Baccusi	c. 1550 – 1609	Italian		
Emilio de' Cavalieri	c. 1550 – 1602	Italian		
Francis Cutting	1550 – 1595/1596	English		
Sebastián Raval	c. 1550 – 1604	Spanish		
David Sacerdote	1550 – 1625	Italian	Earliest known Jewish composer of polyphonic music, active at Mantua	
Giovanni Battista Conforti	fl. c. 1550–1570	Italian		
Charles Tessier	c. 1550 – after 1604	French	Active in England and Germany	
Ambrosio Cotes	c. 1550 – 1603	Spanish		
Jan Trojan Turnovský	c. 1550 – 1606	Czech		
Vicente Espinel	1550 – 1624	Spanish		
Tomasz Szadek	c. 1550 – 1612	Polish		
Pedro de Cristo	c. 1550 – 1618	Portuguese		
Jacobus Gallus	1550 – 1591	Slovenian	Also known as Jacob Handl; active in Moravia and Bohemia	
Pavel Spongopaeus Jistebnický	c. 1550 – 1619	Czech		
Krzysztof Klabon	c. 1550 – 1616	Polish		
Benedetto Pallavicino	c. 1551 – 1601	Italian		
Giulio Caccini	1551 – 1618	Italian	One of the founders of opera	
Sebastián de Vivanco	c. 1551 – 1622	Spanish		
Girolamo Conversi	fl. c. 1572–1575	Italian		
Girolamo Belli	1552 – c. 1620	Italian		
Leonhard Lechner	c. 1553 – 1606	German		
Johannes Eccard	1553 – 1611	German		
Edmund Hooper	c. 1553 – 1621	English	Also spelled Hoop; contributed to Michael East's psalter and William Leighton's Teares, and wrote some intensely expressive anthems; has two keyboard pieces in the Fitzwilliam Virginal Book	
William Inglott	c. 1553/54 – 1621	English	Also spelled Inglott; two keyboard pieces in the Fitzwilliam Virginal Book; there is also an untitled keyboard piece by 'Englitt' in a MS in the British Museum	
Luca Marenzio	c. 1553 – 1599	Italian		
Girolamo Diruta	c. 1554 – after 1610	Italian		
Cosimo Bottegari	1554 – 1620	Italian		
Rinaldo del Mel	c. 1554 – c. 1598	Franco-Flemish	Active in Italy	
Giovanni Gabrieli	1554/1557 – 1612	Italian	Nephew of Andrea Gabrieli	
Paolo Bellasio	1554 – 1594	Italian		
Emmanuel Adriaenssen	1554 – 1604	Franco-Flemish		
Giovanni Giacomo Gastoldi	c. 1554 – 1609	Italian		
Elway Bevin	c. 1554 – 1638	English	Possibly Welsh	
Alonso Lobo	c. 1555 – 1617	Spanish		
Manuel Rodrigues Coelho	c. 1555 – c. 1635	Portuguese		
Paolo Quagliati	1555 – 1628	Italian		
John Mundy	c. 1555 – 1630	English	Son of William Mundy; published a volume of Songs and Psalms in 1594, contributed to the Triumphs of Oriana, composed English and Latin sacred music, and is represented with five pieces in the Fitzwilliam Virginal Book; his Goe from my window variations are a particularly fine example of the genre	
Johannes Nucius	c. 1556 – 1620	German		
Jacob Paix	c. 1556 - 1623	German		
Wojciech Długoraj	c. 1557 – after 1619	Polish		
Carolus Luython	1557 – 1620	Franco-Flemish		
Jacques Mauduit	1557 – 1627	French		
Thomas Morley	1557/1558 – 1603	English		
Cornelis Schuyt	1557 – 1616	Dutch		
Giovanni Croce	c. 1557 – 1609	Italian		
Alfonso Fontanelli	1557 – 1622	Italian		
Nathaniel Giles	c. 1558 – 1634	English		
Richard Carlton	1558 – 1638	English		
Scipione Stella	1558/1559 – 1622	Italian		
Ferdinando Richardson	1558 – 1618	English	Also known as Sir Ferdinando Heybourne; there survives a keyboard Pavan and Galliard, each with variation, in the Fitzwilliam Virginal Book	
Philippus Schoendorff	1558 – 1617	Franco-Flemish		
Giovanni Bassano	c. 1558 – 1617	Italian		
Leone Leoni	c. 1560 – 1627	Italian	Maestro di cappella at Vicenza	
Dario Castello	c. 1560 – c. 1658	Italian		
August Nörmiger	c. 1560 – 1613	German		
Thomas Robinson	1560 – 1610	English		
Peter Philips	1560 – 1628	English	Exiled to Flanders	
Felice Anerio	c. 1560 – 1614	Italian	Brother of Giovanni Francesco Anerio	
Diomedes Cato	c. 1560 – after 1618	Polish-Lithuanian-Italian	Worked all his life in Poland	
William Cobbold	1560 – 1639	English	Organist at Norwich Cathedral (from 1594 to 1608); a single piece by him exists in Ravenscroft's 1621 collection	
Juan Esquivel Barahona	c. 1560 – after 1625	Spanish		
William Brade	1560 – 1630	English	Active in Denmark and Germany	
Richard Allison	c. 1560/1570 – before 1610	English		
Giovanni Bernardino Nanino	1560 – 1623	Italian	Brother of Giovanni Maria Nanino	
Scipione Dentice	1560 – 1635	Italian		
Ruggiero Giovannelli	c. 1560 – 1625	Italian		
Hieronymus Praetorius	1560 – 1629	German		
Carlo Gesualdo	1560 – 1613	Italian		
Antonio Il Verso	c. 1560 – 1621	Italian		
Lodovico Grossi da Viadana	1560 – 1627	Italian		
Giulio Belli	c. 1560 – c. 1621	Italian		
Nicholas Dáll Pierce	c. 1561 – 1653	Irish		
Philippe Rogier	c. 1561 – 1596	Franco-Flemish	Active in Spain	
Jacopo Peri	1561 – 1633	Italian		
Francesco Usper	c. 1561 – 1641	Italian	Also known as Spongia	
Elias Mertel	c. 1561 – 1626	German		
Sebastián Aguilera de Heredia	1561 – 1627	Spanish		
John Bull	1562 – 1628	English	Exiled to the Netherlands	
Jean Titelouze	1562/1563 – 1633	French		
Jan Pieterszoon Sweelinck	1562 – 1621	Franco-Flemish		
Andreas Raselius	c. 1563 – 1602	German		
Cornelis Verdonck	1563 – 1625	Franco-Flemish		
John Dowland	1563 – 1626	English		
Giles Farnaby	c. 1563 – 1640	English		
John Milton	c. 1563 – 1647	English	Father of the poet John Milton; composed madrigals, one of which was printed in The Triumphs of Oriana, as well as anthems, Psalm settings, a motet, and some consort music including a six-part In nomine	
Kryštof Harant z Polžic a Bezdružic	1564 – 1621	Czech		
Hans Leo Hassler	1564 – 1612	German		
John Danyel	1564 – after 1625	English	Also spelled Danyell; brother of the poet Samuel Daniel (spellings of the names of the two brothers differ)	
Giulio Cesare Martinengo	1564 or 1568 – 1613	Italian		
Simone Molinaro	1565 – 1615	Italian		
William Leighton	c. 1565 – 1622	English		
John Hilton	1565 – 1609	English	Probably father of John Hilton 'the younger' (1599–1657)	
Gregor Aichinger	1565 – 1628	German		
Michael Cavendish	c. 1565 – 1628	English		
John Farmer	c. 1565 – 1605	English		
Francis Pilkington	c. 1565 – 1638	English	Lutenist	
Paola Massarenghi	born 1565, fl. 1585	Italian		
George Kirbye	c. 1565 – 1634	English		
Erasmo Marotta	1565 – 1641	Italian		
Ascanio Mayone	1565 – 1627	Italian		
Duarte Lobo	c. 1565 – 1647	Portuguese		
Alessandro Piccinini	1566 – 1638	Italian		
Gaspar Fernandes	1566 – 1629	Portuguese		
Manuel Cardoso	1566 – 1650	Portuguese		
Julien Perrichon	1566 – c. 1600	French	Also a lutenist	
Lucia Quinciani	born c. 1566, fl. 1611	Italian		
Jean-Baptiste Besard	1567 – 1625	Burgundian		
Nicolas Formé	1567 – 1638	French		
Christoph Demantius	1567 – 1643	German		
Lorenzo Allegri	1567 – 1648	Italian		
Joachim van den Hove	c. 1567 – 1620	Dutch		
Girolamo Giacobbi	1567 – 1629	Italian		
Giovanni Francesco Anerio	c. 1567 – buried 1630	Italian	Brother of Felice Anerio	
Claudio Monteverdi	1567 – 1643	Italian		
Thomas Campion	1567 – 1620	English	Also spelled Campian; the only English composer to experiment with musique mesurée, and the first to imitate the Florentine monodists	
Christian Erbach	1568 – 1635	German		
Bartolomeo Barbarino	1568 – 1617 or later	Italian		
Adriano Banchieri	1568 – 1634	Italian		
Joan Baptista Comes	1568 – 1643	Spanish		
Philip Rosseter	c. 1568 – 1623	English		
Tobias Hume	c. 1569 – 1645	English	Responsible for the earliest known use of col legno in Western music	
William Tisdale	born c. 1570	English		
Orazio Bassani	before 1570 – 1615	Italian		
Peeter Cornet	1570/1580 – 1633	Franco-Flemish		
Joan Pau Pujol	1570 – 1626	Spanish		
Melchior Borchgrevinck	c. 1570 – 1632	Dutch-Danish		
John Cooper	c. 1570 – 1626	English		
Salamone Rossi	1570 – 1630	Italian		
Claudia Sessa	c. 1570 – between 1613–19	Italian		
Pierre Guédron	1570 – 1620	French		
Giovanni Paolo Cima	1570 – 1622	Italian		
Paul Peuerl	1570 – 1625	German		
Thomas Bateson	c. 1570 – 1630	English		
Giovanni Picchi	1571 – 1643	Italian		
Thomas Lupo	1571 – 1627	English	Also known as Thomas Lupo The Elder; composer of several works, but solid attribution of many works to him or another of his relatives is difficult	
John Ward	1571 – 1638	English		
Michael Praetorius	c. 1571 – 1621	German		
Filipe de Magalhães	1571 – 1652	Portuguese		
Giovanni Battista Fontana	1571 – 1630	Italian		
Stefano Venturi del Nibbio	fl. 1592–1600	Italian	Active in Florence. Collaborated with Giulio Caccini on the early opera Il rapimento di Cefalo	
Edward Johnson	1572 – 1601	English	Contributed to Michael East's psalter and The Triumphs of Oriana and more	
Moritz von Hessen-Kassel	1572 – 1632	German		
Daniel Bacheler	1572 – 1618	English		
Thomas Tomkins	1572 – 1656	English		
Johannes Vodnianus Campanus	1572 – 1622	Czech		
Erasmus Widmann	1572 – 1634	German		
Robert Ballard		French		
Martin Peerson	1572 – 1650	English	May be the same person as Martin Pearson; four keyboard pieces in the Fitzwilliam Virginal Book; many works also published	
Ellis Gibbons	1573 – 1603	English	Brother of Orlando Gibbons	
Cesarina Ricci	born c. 1573, fl. 1597	Italian		
Géry de Ghersem	1573/1575 – 1630	Franco-Flemish	Active in Spain and the Netherlands	
Truid Aagesen	fl. 1593–1625	Danish		
Andreas Hakenberger	1574 – 1627	German		
John Wilbye	1574 – 1638	English		
Claudio Pari	1574 – after 1619	Franco-Flemish	Active in Italy	
Francesco Rasi	1574 – 1621	Italian		
Vittoria Aleotti	c. 1575 – after 1620	Italian	Believed to be the same person as Raffaella Aleotti (c. 1570 – after 1646)	
John Bennet	c. 1575 – after 1614	English		
Estêvão de Brito	1575 – 1641	Portuguese		
Giovanni Maria Trabaci	1575 – 1647	Italian		
John Coprario	c. 1575 – 1626	English		
Daniel Farrant	1575 – 1671	English		
William Simmes	c. 1575 – c. 1625	English		
Estêvão Lopes Morago	c. 1575 – c. 1630	Portuguese		
Ennemond Gaultier	1575 – 1651	French		
Michelagnolo Galilei	1575 – 1631	Italian	Active in Bavaria and Poland; son of composer Vincenzo Galilei; brother of astronomer and physicist Galileo Galilei	
Giovanni Priuli	1575 – 1626	Italian		
Ignazio Donati	1575 – 1638	Italian		
Alfonso Ferrabosco the younger	c. 1575 – 1628	English	Illegitimate son of Alfonso Ferrabosco the elder	
Thomas Weelkes	1576 – 1623	English		
John Maynard	c. 1577 – between 1614–33	English	Primarily known from one published work, The XIII Wonders of the World, published in London in 1611; It contains twelve songs, six duets for lute and viol, and seven pieces for lyra viol with optional bass viol	
Sulpitia Cesis	born 1577, fl. 1619	Italian		
Antonio Brunelli	1577 – 1630	Italian		
Stefano Bernardi	1577 – 1637	Italian		
Robert Jones	1577 – 1617	English	Published five volumes of simple and melodious lute songs, and one of madrigals	
Didier Le Blanc	fl. 1578 – 1584	French	Published arrangements and settings of airs de cour and chansons, composed a setting of the Te Deum, and contributed to a volume of counterpoint studies	
Agostino Agazzari	1578 – 1640	Italian		
John Amner	1579 – 1641	English		
Melchior Franck	1579 – 1639	German		
John Holmes	died 1629, fl. from 1599	English		
Ruaidrí Dáll Ó Catháin	c. 1580 – c. 1653	Irish		
Benjamin Cosyn	c. 1580 – c. 1653	English	Also spelled Cosin, Cosens; compiler of the manuscript Cosyn's Virginal Book	
Hans Nielsen	1580 – 1626	Danish		
Cormac Mac Diarmata	died 1618	Irish		
Richard Dering	c. 1580 – 1630	English		
Thomas Ford	c. 1580 – 1648	English		
Johann Stobäus	1580 – 1646	German		
Thomas Vautor	born c. 1580/90	English	Published a volume of five- and six-part madrigals in 1619; his best-known piece is Sweet Suffolk Owl	
John Lugg	1580 – 1647/1655	English	There survive nine plainsong settings, one hexachord, and three voluntaries for double organ in a Christ Church autograph MS, among others	
Vincenzo Ugolini	1580 – 1638	Italian		
Johannes Hieronymus Kapsberger	1580 – 1651	German		
Adreana Basile	c. 1580 – c. 1640	Italian		
Michael East	c. 1580 – 1648	English	Probably the son of Thomas East	
Caterina Assandra	1580 – after 1618	Italian		
Henry Youll	born c. 1580/90	English	His Canzonets to Three Voyces, although clearly the work of an amateur, have charm and individuality	
Bellerofonte Castaldi	1581 – 1649	Italian		
Johann Staden	1581 – 1634	German		
Johannes Jeep	1581/1582 – 1644	German		
Sigismondo d'India	c. 1582 – 1629	Italian		
Gregorio Allegri	1582 – 1652	Italian	Brother of Domenico Allegri	
Thomas Ravenscroft	c. 1582 – c. 1633	English	Published a book of psalms amongst others	
Severo Bonini	1582 – 1663	Italian		
Giovanni Valentini	1582 – 1649	Italian		
Marco da Gagliano	1582 – 1643	Italian		
Thomas Simpson	1582 – c. 1628	English	Active in Denmark	
Robert Johnson	c. 1583 – 1633	English	Active in England and Scotland	
Girolamo Frescobaldi	1583 – 1643	Italian		
Orlando Gibbons	1583 – 1625	English		
Johann Daniel Mylius	c. 1583 – 1642	German		
Mogens Pedersøn	c. 1583 – 1623	Danish		
Paolo Agostino	1583 – 1629	Italian		
Nicolas Vallet	1583 – 1642	Dutch		
Antonio Cifra	1584 – 1629	Italian		
Daniel Friderici	1584 – 1638	German		
Michael Altenburg	1584 – 1640	German		
Nicolò Corradini	1585 – 1646	Italian		
Domenico Allegri	1585 – 1629	Italian	Brother of Gregorio Allegri	
Francesco Rognoni	c. 1585 – after 1626	Italian		
Johann Grabbe	1585 – 1655	German		
Andrea Falconieri	1585 – 1656	Italian		
Peter Hasse	1585 – 1640	German		
Heinrich Schütz	1585 – 1672	German		
Alessandro Grandi	1586 – 1630	Italian		
Paul Siefert	1586 – 1666	German		
Claudio Saracini	1586 – 1630	Italian		
Johann Hermann Schein	1586 – 1630	German		
Jacob Praetorius	1586 – 1651	German		
Antoine Boësset	1586 – 1643	French		
Stefano Landi	1586 – 1643	Italian		
Guillaume Bouzignac	1587 – 1643	French		
John Adson	1587 – 1640	English		
Samuel Scheidt	1587 – 1654	German		
Ivan Lukačić	1587 – 1648	Croatian		
Nicholas Lanier	1588 – 1666	English		
Johann Andreas Herbst	1588 – 1666	French		
Walter Porter	c. 1588 – 1659	English	Madrigalist; publications include instrumental toccatas, sinfonias and ritornellos as well as vocal pieces	
Giovanni Battista Riccio	fl. 1609-after 1621	Italian		
Mikołaj Zieleński	fl. 1611	Polish		
George Handford	fl. c. 1609	English	Book of Ayresin MS bears a dedication to Prince Henry dated 1609, but was never published	
John Bartlet	fl. 1606 to 1610	English		
Giovanni Battista Grillo	died 1622	Italian		
Marcantonio Negri	died 1624	Italian		
Johannes Thesselius	1590 – 1643	German		
Manuel Machado	1590 – 1646	Portuguese		
Hans Brachrogge	c. 590 – 1638	Danish		
Robert Ramsey	1590s – 1644	English	Composed mythological and biblical dialogues, such as Dives and Abraham, Saul and the Witch of Endor, and Orpheus and Pluto	
Andreas Chyliński	1590 – after 1635	Polish		
Adam Jarzębski	1590 – 1648	Polish		
Johann Schop	1590 – 1667	German		
Jacob van Eyck	1590 – 1657	Dutch		
Richard Mico	1590 – 1661	English	Two 18th-century arrangements for viols of keyboard pavans in a MS in the British Museum survive	
Robert Dowland	1591 – 1641	English	Son of John Dowland; only three works are definitely ascribed to him: two lute pieces in the 'Varietie of Lute Lessons' and one in the 'Margaret Board Lutebook'	
Jacques Gaultier	1592 – 1652	French		
John Jenkins	1592 – 1678	English		
Cornelis Thymenszoon Padbrué	c. 1592 – 1670	Dutch		
Melchior Schildt	1592/1593 – 1667	German		
Gottfried Scheidt	1593 – 1661	German		
Johann Ulrich Steigleder	1593 – 1635	German		
Henry Lawes	1595 – 1662	English		
John Wilson	1595 – 1674	English		
Heinrich Scheidemann	1595 – 1663	German		
Constantijn Huygens	1596 – 1687	Dutch		
Mathieu Gascongne	fl. 1517–1518	French		
Charles Racquet	1597 – 1664	French		
Andreas Düben	1597 – 1662	Swedish		
Johann Crüger	1598 – 1662	German		
Thomas Selle	1599 – 1663	German		
John Hilton the younger	1599 – 1657	English		
Pierre Gaultier	1599 – 1681	French		
Étienne Moulinié	1599 – 1676	French		
Adam Václav Michna z Otradovic	c. 1600 – 1676	Czech		
Delphin Strungk	1600/1601 – 1694	German		
Richard Nicholson	died 1639	English	Composed English and Latin church music, and consort songs, in humorous rather than melancholy vein, and contributed to The Triumphs of Oriana	
Simon Ives	1600 – 1662	English		
Manuel Correia	1600 – 1653	Portuguese		
Christopher Simpson	1602/1606 – 1669	English		
William Lawes	1602 – 1645	English		
John IV of Portugal	1603 – 1656	Portuguese		
Thomas Greaves	fl. 1604	English		
William Child	1606 – 1697	English		
Juan Arañés	died 1649	Spanish		
William Corkine	fl. 1610–1617	English		
William Young	1610 – 1662	English		
Bartłomiej Pękiel	fl. 1633 – c. 1670	Polish		
George Jeffreys	1610 – 1685	English		
Mlle Bocquet	early 17th century – after 1660	French		
