= Allegri =

Allegri is an Italian surname. Notable people with the surname include:

- Abraham Allegri (17th century), rabbi
- Ángel Allegri (1926–1981), Argentine footballer
- Angelo Allegri (born 1999), American basketball player
- Antonio da Correggio (1489–1534, full name Antonio Allegri da Correggio), Italian Renaissance painter
- Carlo Allegri (1862–1938), Italian engineer
- Domenico Allegri (1585–1629), Italian composer (brother of Gregorio)
- Gregorio Allegri (1582–1652), Italian composer (the composer of a well-known Miserere)
- Lorenzo Allegri (painter) (died 1527), Italian painter and uncle of Correggio
- Lorenzo Allegri (1567–1648), Italian composer and lutenist (sometimes known as Lorenzino Tedesco)
- Massimiliano Allegri (born 1967), Italian football manager and former player
- Natasha Allegri (born 1986), American animation creator, writer and storyboard artist
- Pomponio Allegri (1521–1593), Italian painter
