= Nicolas Millot =

French composer

Nicolas Millot (d. 1590 or later) was a French composer of the late Renaissance, mainly of chansons. He was also a singer in the French royal chapel, which he served in various capacities for about thirty years. After Claude Goudimel, Guillaume Costeley, and Nicolas de La Grotte, he was one of the leading composers of chansons in France in the 1560s.

== Life ==
No information has yet been found regarding his early life. The earliest surviving records involves his employment with the Ste Chapelle in Paris at the end of 1559, where a Noel Millot, probably the same person, was one of the clerks. By the next year he begins to appear in the archives of the French royal chapel as a singer, and he remained there until at least 1590.

Among his duties was the recruitment of singers from other regions of France. In 1572, Charles IX sent him to Tours to find choirboys. There are several other references to his activity in the royal chapel in the 1570s and 1580s, including a mention that he was one of the maîtres de chapelle of Henry III in 1575, and that he had been sous-maître de la chapelle de musique du Roy for 20 years by 1585. He seems to have ended his career as master of the choirboys (maître des enfans) for Catherine de' Medici.

In 1590 he signed his own will in a hand evidently frail with age; there are no further records of his life or musical activity, although the date and circumstances of his death have not been recorded.

== Music ==
Millot was one of a large number of French composers active in the third quarter of the 16th century as significant creators of chansons. While not as prolific a composer, or as highly regarded, as Guillaume Costeley, Jean Maillard, Nicolas de La Grotte, or especially the renowned Claude Le Jeune his work was widely distributed and highly regarded. He published 30 chansons in Paris, as well as one collection of works loosely classifiable as sacred: the Les proverbes de Salomon mis en musique, a collection of 20 settings from the Book of Proverbs.

Millot's style was conservative, especially compared to the contemporary composers of musique mesurée such as Claude Le Jeune. The chansons by Millot resembled those of the previous generation, for example, works by Clément Janequin and Sandrin, with their alternating polyphonic and homophonic textures. More progressive composers writing chansons in the 1560s and 1570s generally put the melodic line in the topmost voice, strove for a homophonic texture, and in the case of the musique mesurée, used metrical irregularity to align the strong beats and long notes in the music with the natural accents of the French language. Millot usually avoided these features in his own music.

Poetry set by Millot included works by Pierre de Ronsard, as well as popular verse.
