= De Févin =

de Févin is a French surname. Notable people with the surname include:

- Antoine de Févin (c. 1470–1511/12), Franco-Flemish composer
- Robert de Févin (1450–1515), his brother and colleague-composer
