= Nanino =

Nanino is a surname. Notable people with the surname include:

- Giovanni Maria Nanino (also Nanini; 1543 or 1544 – 1607), influential composer of the Roman school
- Giovanni Bernardino Nanino (ca. 1560 – 1623), composer and younger brother of Giovanni Maria
- Carlagnese Nanino (1932–2022), German nun
