= A'Court =

A'Court or Acourt (/ˈeɪkɔːrt/ AY-kort) is a surname. Notable people with the surname include:

- Alan A'Court (1934–2009), English footballer
- Charles A'Court (1819–1903), Liberal Party politician in the United Kingdom
- Charlie A'Court (born 1978), Canadian musician, songwriter and producer
- Dennis A'Court (1937–2021), Welsh cricketer who played for Gloucestershire
- Michèle A'Court (born 1961), New Zealand comedian
- Samuel A'Court Ashe (1840–1938), Confederate infantry captain in the American Civil War
- Acourt, 15th century French composer

== See also ==
- William à Court (disambiguation)
