= Abrahan =

Abrahan may refer to:

- Abrahan (composer), 16th century French composer
- Gee-Ann Abrahan, Filipino actress
