= Jacotin =

Jacotin (French diminutive of Jacques) may refer to:

- Jacob Godebrye (?–1529), active in the Antwerp Cathedral from 1479 to 1529
- Jacques (or Giacomo) Level, singer who served the papal chapel in Rome between 1516 and 1521
- Jacotin Le Bel (?–1555), singer and canon in the French royal chapel from 1532 to 1555 believed to be the same person as Jacques Level
- Jacquet of Mantua (1483–1559), French composer who spent almost his entire life in Italy
- Jacquet de Berchem (c.1505–1567), Franco-Flemish composer active in Italy
- Jacques Arcadelt (c.1507–1568), Franco-Flemish composer active in both Italy and France
- Giaches de Wert (1535–1596), Franco-Flemish composer active in Italy
- Marie-Louise Dubreil-Jacotin (1905-1972), French mathematician
- Pierre Jacotin (1765–1827), French map-maker for Napoleon
