= Baisez-moi =

"Baisez-moi" (French: "Kiss me") is a renaissance French chanson for 4 voices, anonymous in publication by Pierre Attaignant but attributed to the composer Josquin Desprez. The song was the model for masses by Petrus Roselli and the Missa Baises-moy by Mathurin Forestier.

== Lyrics ==
Baisez moy ma doulce amy
Par amour je vous en prie
Non feray. Et pour quoy?
Si je faisois la folie
Ma mere en seroit marye
Vela de quoy.

== Recordings ==
The song was recorded by the Kings Singers on the 1975 album The Kings Singers Concert Collection in a sequence of 5 chansons: La belle Margarite by Clemens non Papa, Baisez moi by Josquin Desprez, Petite camusette, also attributed to Josquin Desprez, Mon coeur en vous (anonymous) and Au joly jeu du pousse avant by Clément Jannequin.
