= Guillaume Costeley =

French composer

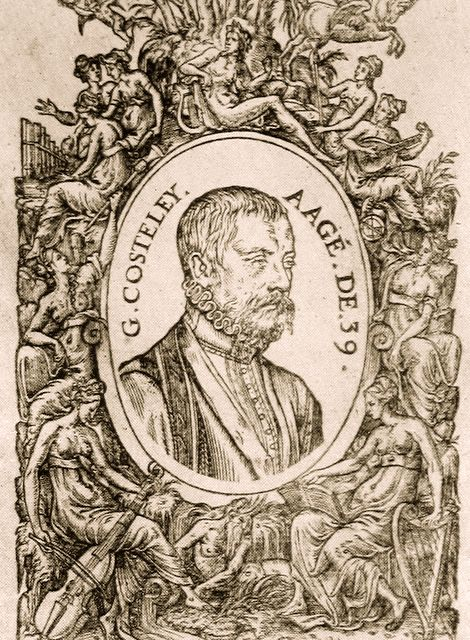
Guillaume Costeley in 1570: Le Roy & Ballard, Musique de Guillaume Costeley

Guillaume Costeley [pronounced Cotelay] (1530, possibly 1531 – 28 January 1606) was a French composer of the Renaissance. He was the court organist to Charles IX of France and famous for his numerous chansons, which were representative of the late development of the form; his work in this regard was part of the early development of the style known as musique mesurée. He was also one of very few 16th century French composers of music for keyboard. In addition, he was a founding member of the Académie de Poésie et de Musique along with poet Jean-Antoine de Baïf, and he was one of the earliest composers to experiment with microtonal composition.

== Life ==
Costeley was born in Fontanges-en-Auvergne, coincidentally the same town as contemporary composer Antoine de Bertrand. Nothing is known of him prior to his arrival in Paris in or before 1554, at which time he met, and became acquainted with the music of, such diverse figures as Jean Maillard, Jacques Arcadelt, and Sandrin. It was through Sandrin, who had recently worked in Italy, that Costeley probably became interested in the latest trends in Italian scholarship, particularly the theories of Nicola Vicentino, some of which involved composition using microtones. Costeley's only microtonal composition, Seigneur Dieu ta pitié, was apparently written at exactly the time that Sandrin was in Paris.

During the late 1550s Costeley rose in prominence in Parisian musical life, being published by Le Roy and Ballard in 1559. Since Le Roy was closely connected to the royal court through the family of Catherine de Clermont, who was to become the Countess of Retz, it is probable that his influence was significant in Costeley's rise. By 1560 Costeley had been appointed to the royal court, as organist, music teacher to the ten-year-old monarch, and composer of chansons for the royal chamber.

In 1570 he published Musique de Guillaume Costeley, which contains almost all of his surviving works. In November of this same year King Henry III granted a charter for the formation of the Académie de poésie et de musique, of which Costeley was a founding member; there is, however, no evidence of any musical composition by Costeley between 1570 and his death in 1606. He was lauded by the group and took part in its activities (the king himself was probably a member, and attended some of their meetings, as did his successor Charles IX after 1574). Baïf himself, the founder of the Académie, wrote several poems in Costeley's honor.

However Costeley was no longer resident full-time at Paris. He had purchased a house in Évreux in Normandy, and married; the King only required him to be at court for the first three months of the year. Records of his property purchases indicate that he had become wealthy in service of the king. In 1581 he was made tax assessor at Évreux, and in 1592 his wife died and he married again. In 1597 he was named as an advisor to the king ("Conseiller du Roy"), and he seems to have remained in Évreux in semi-retirement until his death.

== Music and influence ==
Costeley's surviving music amounts to about 100 chansons, as well as three motets and a fantasy for organ. Everything that he wrote can be dated to the period between 1554 and 1569.

His motets, his only known sacred works, are for four and five voices and show the influence of Jean Maillard. A connection between the two is assumed since they both set the same unusual text (Domine salvum fac regem desiderium cordis ejus), and their settings contain apparently deliberate similarities.

Costeley's chansons were by far the most famous part of his output, and they are in the Parisian chanson style of the time, with vivid word painting, along with a tendency to think harmonically rather than polyphonically – as the age of purely polyphonic writing was coming to an end over most of Europe. The subject matter of the chansons is widely varied, as was true for most composers in the genre; some of the chansons are love songs, some are imitations of war or victory odes, and some are humorous or scatological.

A peculiarity of Costeley's style – and his notation – is that he specified the accidentals he wanted applied to his music with great care and precision, something which was unusual prior to the middle of the 16th century, but which began to occur thereafter. He was fond of unusual melodic intervals, such as the diminished third, and probably wanted to make sure they were performed correctly. Some of his chansons, for example the earthy Grosse garce noire et tendre, use this interval prominently: in this work he uses it in an imitative passage. In other pieces he uses augmented intervals, including seconds, fourths, fifths, and sixths. Even more unusual than his use of previously prohibited intervals, however, is his pioneering use of microtones. The chanson Seigneur Dieu ta pitié of 1558 made use of justly tuned enharmonic intervals which, if played on a keyboard instrument, would require nineteen keys per octave; Costeley specifies that tuning such an instrument in equal "thirds of a tone" would be necessary to perform his chanson. This amounts to a specification of 19 equal temperament for a keyboard version of this chanson.

While he was a member of Jean-Antoine de Baïf's Academie de musique et de poésie, few of his works show the influence of, or intent to contribute to, the newly developed genre of musique mesurée. Only two compositions in the collection entitled Musique, published in 1570, show the metrical freedom which characterizes the style.

One instrumental composition by Costeley has survived, and that only in a reconstructed version from a manuscript prepared by a non-musician. It is a short fantasie for organ (Fantasie [pour] orgue ou espinette faicte par monsieur Coteley [musicien] de la Chappelle du Roy), and is considered significant because it is one of the only surviving bits of keyboard music from late 16th-century France, other than pieces transcribed from vocal originals. The repertory of French keyboard players from the time seems to not have been written down, and certainly remained unpublished.

== Selected recordings ==
- Airs et chansons au temps du roy Henry. A Sei Voci 1987, digital re-release 2010
- Guillaume Costeley Musicque A Sei Voci Erato Records 1999
- Guillaume Costeley Mignonne Allons Voir Si La Rose : Chansons Spirituelles Et Amoureuses Ludus Modalis, Bruno Boterf Ramée 2013
