= Vincenzo Ugolini =

Italian composer

Vincenzo Ugolini (Perugia, 1 November 1578 - Rome, 6 May 1638) was an Italian composer of the early Baroque era and of the Roman School.

== Life ==
Born in Perugia, he was first a puer chori (boy soprano) at San Luigi dei Francesi in Rome under Giovanni Bernardino Nanino; then he was engaged as a contralto until July 1594 and as a bass from the beginning of May 1600 until the end of 1601.

In 1603 he was mastro di capella of Santa Maria Maggiore, in Rome. After an illness in 1606, he left this work in 1609 and became maestro at the Duomo of Benevento. This position he held until 1615, with a hiatus in 1614 where he worked for Cardinal Arrigoni in Rome. From 2 July 1616 he turned to San Luigi dei Francesi holding the same positions, and in 1620 he succeeded Francesco Soriano as maestro of the Cappella Giulia at San Pietro. During this time he also tutored the mezzo-soprano singer Marc'Antonio Pasqualini.

In 1629 he was deponent for the testament of the composer Domenico Allegri, brother of Gregorio Allegri.

From May 1631 he was again maestro of San Luigi, and held the post until his death in 1638. His successor was his pupil Orazio Benevoli.

== Works ==
- Sacrae cantiones, lib. 1, 8vv, bc (Roma, 1614);
- Il primo libro de madrigali, 5vv (Venezia, 1615);
- Il secondo libro de madrigali, 5vv (Venezia, 1615);
- Motecta sive sacrae cantiones, lib. 1, 1–4vv (Venezia, 1616);
- Motecta sive sacrae cantiones, lib.2, 1–4vv (Venezia, 1617);
- Motecta sive sacrae cantiones, lib.3, 1–4vv (Venezia, 1618);
- Motecta sive sacrae cantiones, lib.4, 1–4vv (Roma, 1619);
- Motecta et missae, lib. 2, 8, 12vv, bc (Roma, 1622);
- Psalmi ad vesperas, 8vv, bc (Venezia, 1628);
- Psalmi ad vesperas et motecta, lib. 1, 12vv, bc (Venezia, 1630);
- 2 motets, 2vv, bc, 1618, 1619, 3vv, bc, 1621, 1625;
- 2 hymns: Veni Creator Spiritus, 4vv; Gloria Patri Domino nato, 5vv;
- 4 antiphons: Illuminare his qui in tenebris, 8vv; Omnes gentes plaudite manibus, 8vv; Et tu puer propheta, 8vv; Petrus apostolus, 6vv;
- Litaniae lauretanae, 8vv;
- Lauda Sion Salvatorem, 6vv;
- Favus distillans, mottetto, 8vv, bc;
- Jubilate Deo, 5vv.

== Sources, further reading ==
- Alberto Cametti, La scuola dei «pueri cantus» di S. Luigi dei francesi in Roma e i suoi principali allievi (1591-1623): Gregorio, Domenico e Bartolomeo Allegri, Antonio Cifra, Orazio Benevoli, Torino, Fratelli Bocca, 1915.
- Klaus Fischer, 'Vincenzo Ugolini', in New Grove Dictionary.
- Jean Lionnet, La musique à Saint-Louis des Français de Rome au XVII^{o} siècle, in «Note d’archivio per la storia musicale», n. s., a. III, 1985, suppl.
