= Pomponio Amidano =

Italian painter

Giulio Cesare Amidano (c. 1560s – c. 1630) was an Italian painter of the late-Renaissance style. He was also known as Pomponio Amidano, in part because he is either confused with or was a pupil of Pomponio Allegri; others claim he was a pupil of Francesco Mazzola (Parmigianino). Much of his biography is poorly documented. He is said to have been born in Parma and to have died there from the plague.
