= Mathieu Gascongne =

French composer

Mathieu Gascongne (first name also Matthieu or Matthias; last name also Gascogne, Gascongus, Gascone, Gasconia, and Guascogna; fl. early 16th century) was a French composer of the Renaissance. Contemporaries, such as Adrian Willaert (as quoted by the renowned Venetian theorist Zarlino) grouped him with Josquin, Ockeghem, and Jean Mouton as among the finest composers of the time. Compared with those others, however, little of his output has survived.

== Life ==
Little is known for certain about his life, and there are two principal theories regarding where he lived and worked. The first is that he was associated with the French royal court, for he wrote several motets for official occasions (such as the coronation of King Francis I in 1515); this would have put him there at the same time as Jean Mouton and just after Antoine de Févin. In addition, one document describes him as a priest of the Meaux diocese, and also associates him with the cathedral in Tours; it also names him as a singer in the royal chapel in 1517–1518. A second theory is that he was associated with a group of composers active at Cambrai, since his music appears in manuscripts there. Possibly both theories are correct, and he was active in Paris in the first decades of the 16th century, and at Cambrai later.

== Music and influence ==
Gascongne wrote masses, motets and chansons. Nine masses have been attributed to him, but not all survive complete. Of his motets, two are settings of the Magnificat. The chansons were famous, and Gascongne has been called the inventor, along with Antoine de Févin, of the Parisian chanson rustique. Adrian Willaert, the founder of the Venetian school, also held Gascongne in high regard, stating that he was on the level of Josquin, Ockeghem, and his own teacher Jean Mouton.

Most of his sacred music is for four a cappella voices; he uses as source material chansons by Pierre de la Rue, Jean Mouton and Josquin des Prez. His chansons are mostly for three voices, but there are numerous works which are attributed to him in one source but to another composer in other sources (Mouton is a common competitor for attribution). Stylistically his music is typical of French music of the early 16th century, with smooth, balanced polyphony and pervasive imitation.

== Note ==
1. Lawrence Bernstein, Cantus Firmus in the French Chanson for Two or Three Voices, 1500–1550. Ph.D. dissertation, New York University, 1969.

== References and further reading ==
- Article "Mathieu Gascongne," in The New Grove Dictionary of Music and Musicians, ed. Stanley Sadie. 20 vol. London, Macmillan Publishers Ltd., 1980. ISBN 1-56159-174-2
- Gustave Reese, Music in the Renaissance. New York, W.W. Norton & Co., 1954. ISBN 0-393-09530-4
- Peter Gram Swing: "Mathieu Gascongne", Grove Music Online ed. L. Macy (Accessed November 14, 2005), (subscription access)

== Recording ==
- Capilla Flamenca, The A-La-Mi-Re Manuscripts, Flemish Polyphonic Treasures for Charles V. Naxos CD 8.554744. Contains a portion of his Missa Myn hert.
