= Ebran =

Ebran (also given as Abran, Abrahan, Ebram , Hebran) was a French Renaissance-era composer who flourished from c. 1543 – c. 1564. 12 pieces, all four part vocal works, attributed to Ebran were published in anthologies by Pierre Attaingnant in 1543 and 1549. Three more chansons were published by Nicolas Du Chemin. Adrian Le Roy and his cousin Robert Ballard published two more of his works in 1564, one of which is the composer's best known work, "Tant vous allés doux Guillemette".

== Partial list of compositions ==
- "Celer ne puis" (1543)
- "Cesse raou oeil" (1543)
- "Jaquet ung jour" (1543)
- "Mon cueur avez" (1543)
- "En naymant rien" (1544)
- "Amour hellas" (1545)
- "Depuis qu'Amour a son arc esgaré" (1545)
- "Ung jour diver" (1545)
- "Oncques bon cueur ne fut sans grand amour" (1547)
- "Quand jay la nuyct" (1547)
- " Bien est heureux le jour que je vous vis" (1549)
- "Le dire ouy" (1549)
- " Si je congnois" (1549)
- "Si seul je puis" (1549)
- "Si vous eussiez" (1549)
- "Ce qu' il me faict si aisement" (1550)
- "Las je ne scay de quel nom" (1550)
- " Quest-ce qu' amour, l' un dict" (1550)
- "Tant vous allés doux Guillemette" (1564)
