= James Caldwall =

English draughtsman and engraver (1739–1822)

James Caldwall (1739–1822) was an English draughtsman and engraver.

== Life ==
Caldwall was born in London in 1739, and studied under John Keyse Sherwin. He is known mainly for his portraits, although he also engraved genre and military subjects. He employed a technique which combined both engraving and etching. Between 1768 and 1780 he exhibited 29 works at the Free Society of Artists and one at the Society of Artists. He died in 1822.

His brother, John Caldwall, who died in 1819, was a miniature painter who worked in Scotland.

== Works ==
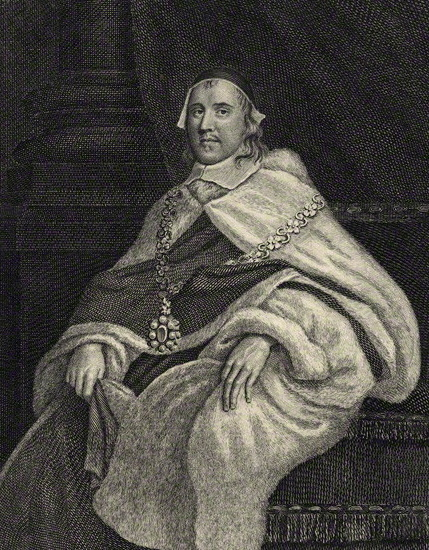
Portrait of John Glynne, Lord Chief Justice, in the National Portrait Gallery collection

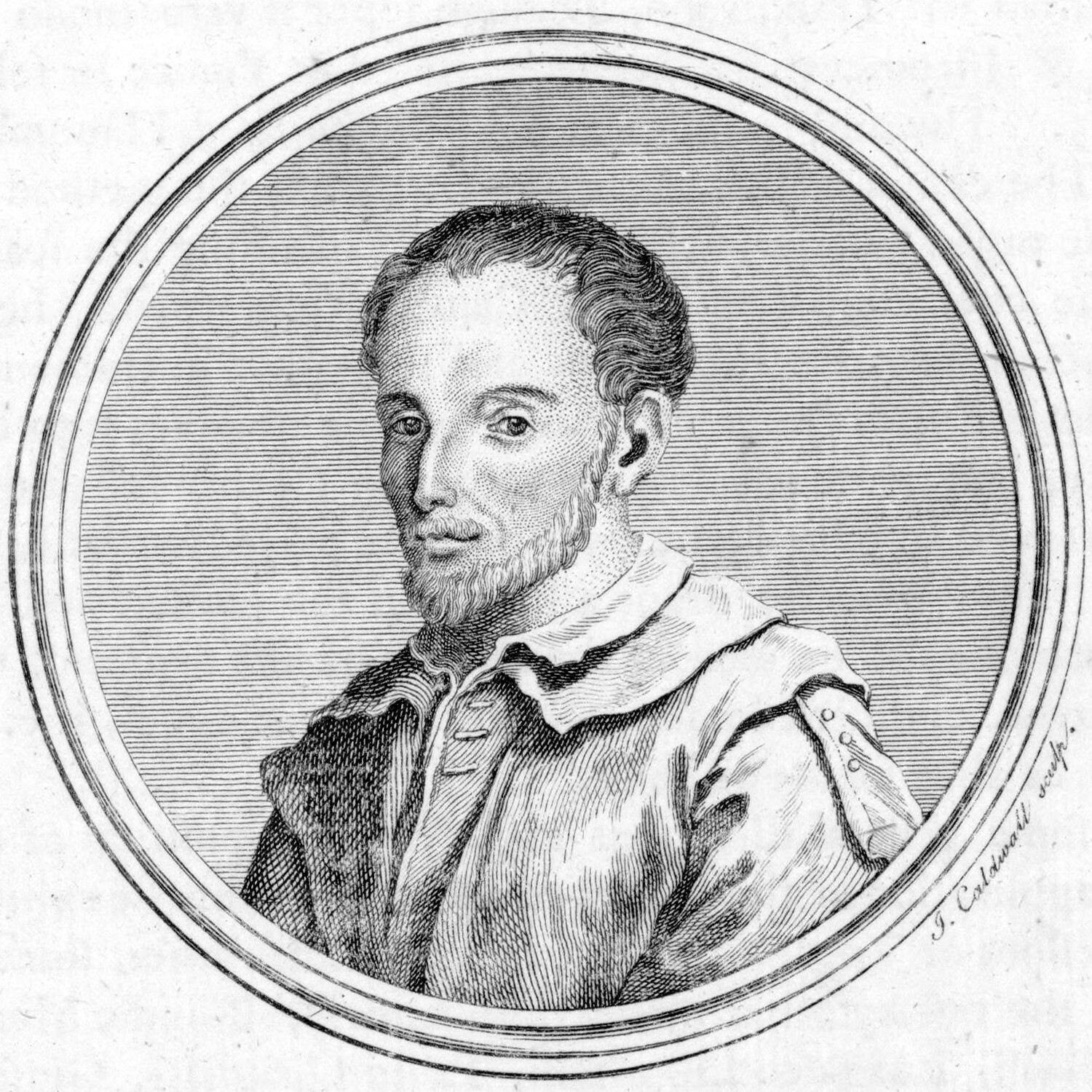
Paolo Agostino, Italian composer of the 17th century

Caldwall's works include:

=== Portraits ===
- Sir Henry Oxenden, Bart.
- Katherine, Countess of Suffolk
- Sir John Glynne, Chief Justice of the King's Bench. (pictured)
- Sir Roger Curtis; after William Hamilton
- Admiral Keppel
- John Gillies, LL.D., historian
- David Hume, historian
- Mrs. Siddons and her Son, in the character of Isabella; after William Hamilton. 1783

=== Other subjects ===
- The Immortality of Garrick; after Carter, the figures engraved by Caldwall, and the landscape by S. Smith. 1783
- The Fete Champêtre given by the Earl of Derby at the Oaks; after R. Adams, engraved by Caldwall and Charles Grignion
- The Camp at Coxheath; after William Hamilton. 1778
