= Petrus Roselli =

Italian composer

Petrus Roselli was a composer based in Italy at the beginning of the sixteenth century. The name could indicate a French born composer by the name of Pierre Roussel, and he was possibly the same as the Pietro Rossello found in the Ferrarese ducal chapel (1499-1502). He is known for his mass Missa Baisez moy, based on the popular song Baisez-moi attributed to Josquin.
