= Sebastian z Felsztyna =

Polish composer (died after 1543)

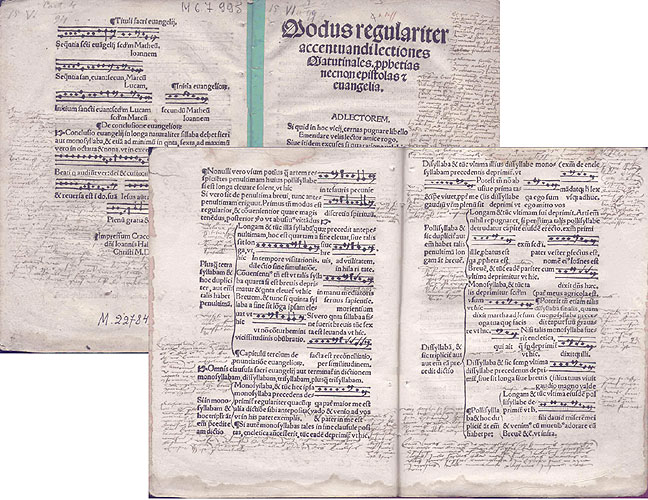
Part of a treatise on singing plainchant (Modus regulariter accentuandi lectiones matutinales prophetias necnon epistolas et evangelia, published anonymously in Kraków, 1518, but attributed to Sebastian)

Sebastian z Felsztyna (Note: Also Sebastian Felstin, Sebastianus Felstinensis, Roxolanus z Felsztyna, and Sebastian Herburt.)) (c. 1480–1490? – after 1543) was a Polish composer and music theorist, regarded as the greatest Polish composer of the early 16th century.

== Life ==
Sebastian z Felsztyna was probably born in Felsztyn in the Kingdom of Poland (present-day Skelivka, Ukraine). In 1507, he entered Kraków University, the same year as his compatriot, the composer Mikołaj z Chrzanowa. While there he studied music and theology until 1509. He may have studied with the German composer Heinrich Finck while in Kraków. After graduating, he returned to Felsztyn, where he became a chaplain. He later went to Sanok, in southeastern Poland, where he was a provost.

== Compositions and theoretical writings ==
Of Sebastian's musical compositions, three motets survive. all composed in 1522. They are for four voices, and use a plainchant tenor in long notes—an archaic practice at the time of publication—with the other voices sometimes engaging in imitation, in free counterpoint, or in more homophonic textures. All three are preserved a manuscript now held in Wawel Cathedral. While archaic in style, they show the influence of the Franco-Flemish school, and are a rare early example of four-voice polyphony in Poland.

Sebastian published a collection of his hymns in 1522 in Kraków, Aliquot hymni ecclesiastici, but no copies exist. His theoretical treatises cover the topics of notation and chant. His most popular was Opusculum musices (c. 1519), which was published in Kraków five years after theoretical treatises first appeared in Poland. It was most likely intended as an instructional work for singers. He produced Directiones musicae ad cathedralis ecclesiae Premisliensis usum (1544), and a version of St Augustine's De Musica, both of which proved less popular than the Opusculum, which was reprinted more than once. The relatively simple treatise lacked the normal discussion on counterpoint.

== List of works ==
=== Writings ===
- Opusculum musice compilatum noviter
- Opusculum musices noviter congestum
- De musica dialogi VI (Kraków, 1536)
- Directiones musicae ad cathedralis ecclesia Premislensis usum (Kraków, 1543)
- Opusculum musice mensuralis (Kraków, 31 October 1517)
- De inventoribus musicae

=== Music ===
Sebastian's three motets all feature Gregorian melodies in the tenor in whole notes.

- Ave Maria (Alleluia ad Rorate cum prosa Ave Maria) for four voices
- Alleluia, Felix es sacra virgo Maria for four voices
- Prosa ad Rorate tempore paschali virgini Mariae laudes four voices

== See also ==
- List of Ukrainian composers (include people of Ukrainian descent or who were born or lived in what is now Ukraine)

== Sources ==
- Reese, Gustave (1959). Music in the Renaissance. New York: W.W. Norton & Co.
- Reiss, Józef Władysław (1984) [1946]. Najpiękniejsza ze wszystkich jest muzyka polska: szkic historycznego rozwoju na tle przeobrażeń społecznych [The most beautiful of all is Polish music: a sketch of historical development against the background of social transformations] (in Polish). Polskie Wydawnictwo Muzyczne. ISBN 978-83-224-0243-6.
