= Guillaume Le Heurteur =

French composer

Guillaume le Heurteur, also known as Guillaume Heurteur and Guillaume Hurteur, (fl. 1530 – c. 1545) was a French composer of the Renaissance about whom very little is known.

== Life and works ==
Very little information is available on the life of Guillaume le Heurteur. He was a canon and preceptor of the choirboys of the Collegiate church Basilica of Saint Martin, Tours as evidenced by the title page of a collection of motets published in 1545 by the Parisian printer Pierre Attaingnant. His name is quoted by François Rabelais in the second prologue to the Le Quart Livre, published in 1552, alongside those of Josquin des Prés, Pierre de La Rue and Jean Mouton. He was the author of four masses, two Magnificats, twenty-two motets and twenty-six chasons which were published between 1530 and 1545 which were published in either Paris or Lyon. A surviving front page of a manuscript containing settings of the biblical poem Song of Songs mentions Heurteur on the title page as the author or motets contained within it, but the remainder of the manuscript has been lost.

== Partial list of works ==
=== Masses ===
- Missa ‘Impetum’ (1532)
- Missa ‘Osculetur me’ (1532)
- Missa ‘Fors seulement’ (1534)
- Missa ‘Ung jour Robin’ (1534)

=== Other sacred works ===
- Magnificat primi toni (1534)
- Magnificat quarti toni (1534)

== Bibliography ==
- Ferrand, Françoise (2011). Guide de la musique de la Renaissance. Les indispensables de la musique. Fayard. p. 1240. ISBN 978-2213606385.
