= Pierre Passereau =

French composer

Pierre Passereau (fl. 1509–1547) was a French composer of the Renaissance. Along with Clément Janequin, he was one of the most popular composers of "Parisian" chansons in France in the 1530s. His output consisted almost exclusively of chansons; most of them were published by printer Pierre Attaingnant. Most of them were "rustic" in character, similar to patter songs, using onomatopoeia, double entendres, and frequent obscenity, a common feature of popular music in France and the Low Countries in the 1530s.

== Life ==
Some details of Passereau's life have been compiled by scholars, including pioneering 19th-century musicologist François-Joseph Fétis in his enormous Biographie universelle des musiciens (1834). Passereau first appears in the historical record as a tenor singer in the chapel of the Count of Angoulême (who was later to become King Francis I); therefore he was already an adult, and born before about 1495. He had some association with both Bourges Cathedral and Cambrai Cathedral, as he appears in the records of both places, and is documented as being a singer at Cambrai between 1525 and 1530. He may also have been a priest at the church of Saint Jacques-de-la-Boucherie in Paris, although this statement by Fétis has not been independently confirmed.

== Music and influence ==
Almost everything Passereau wrote, or everything that has survived, are chansons. Since details of his biography are spotty, it is difficult to determine how much lost work there may be. He is known to have written one sacred composition, a motet, Unde veniet auxilium michi (the text is from Psalm 120, and used in the Office of the Dead).

Passereau's chansons are mostly light-hearted affairs, similar in content to the Italian frottola, although no direct influence from the earlier popular Italian form has been reliably demonstrated. He liked to use nonsense syllables, often in imitation of animals, as in Il est bel et bon, his most popular piece, which imitates the clucking of chickens. This composition was sung as far away as Venice. While Passereau may have gotten the idea from Janequin, who was writing onomatopoeic chansons as early as 1515 (Il est bel et bon was published in 1534), its popularity rivaled that of the music of Janequin, and printer Pierre Attaingnant devoted a book entirely to the music of the two composers (in 1536). It is possible that Francis I, who knew Passereau from his service at the French court, recommended the composer to the printer.

Additional features of Passereau's chansons include the use of quick declamation, chordal passages with occasional polyphony, generally syllabic word setting, satirical and ribald subjects, and catchy rhythms.

An additional indication of Passereau's popularity is his inclusion by François Rabelais as one of a list of popular musicians in Gargantua and Pantagruel.
