= Domenico Allegri =

Italian composer

Domenico Allegri (c. 1585 – 5 September 1629) was an Italian composer and singer of the early Baroque Roman School. He was the second son of the Milanese coachman Costantino Allegri, who lived in Rome with his family, and was a younger brother of the more famous Gregorio Allegri. Costantino sent three sons, Gregorio, Domenico and Bartolomeo, to study music at San Luigi dei Francesi, under the maestro di capella Giovanni Bernardino Nanino, brother of Giovanni Maria Nanino. The little boy had as schoolmates his elder brother Gregorio and then Antonio Cifra, Domenico Massenzio and Paolo Agostini.

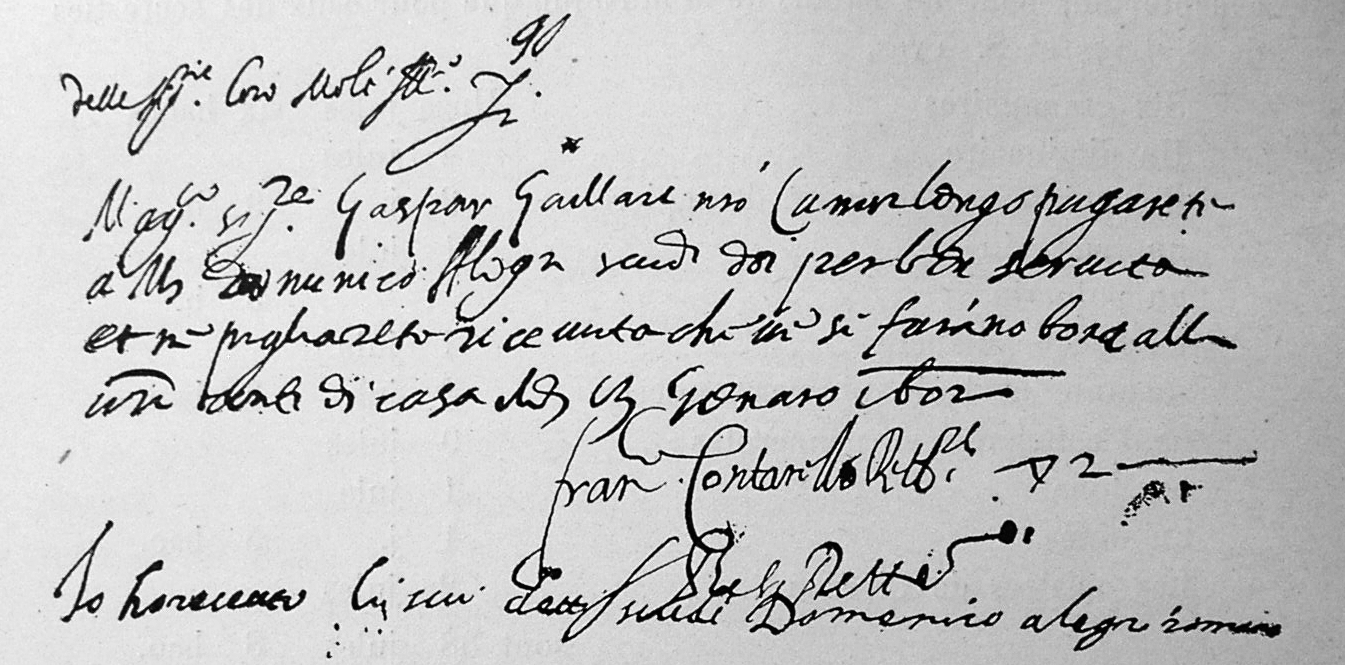
Receipt of the church of San Luigi dei Francesi to the young Domenico Allegri

In 1606, Allegri was maestro di cappella of the church of Santa Maria at Spello, and from September 1609 until April 1610 served in the same role at the church of Santa Maria in Trastevere in Rome. From 3 April 1610 until his death, he held the same position at the Basilica di Santa Maria Maggiore, where he was buried.

Allegri is mainly famous for being one of the first to include specific instrumental accompaniments to sacred vocal music on a small scale. While much of his music is lost, one piece which has survived is the Modi quos expositis in choris of 1617 which has accompaniments to the voices by two violins.

== Bibliography ==
- Alberto Cametti, La scuola dei «pueri cantus» di S. Luigi dei francesi in Roma e i suoi principali allievi (1591-1623): Gregorio, Domenico e Bartolomeo Allegri, Antonio Cifra, Orazio Benevoli, Torino, Fratelli Bocca, 1915.
- Sergio Durante, 'Domenico Allegri', in Dizionario enciclopedico universale della musica e dei musicisti, Torino, UTET, 1983–1999, ISBN 88-02-05345-6.
- Saverio Franchi, Annali della stampa musicale romana dei secoli XVI-XVIII, Vol. 1/I, IBIMUS, Roma, 2006, ISBN 978-88-88627-03-8.
- Antonella Nigro, Domenico Massenzio. A new biography with unpublished documents, in Domenico Massenzio Opera omnia, Critical Edition by Claudio Dall'Albero e Mauro Bacherini, Vol. 1, Milano, Rugginenti, 2008, ISMN M-52013-013-4.
- Alberto Pironti, 'Domenico Allegri', in Dizionario Biografico degli Italiani, Roma, Treccani.
- Colin Timms, 'Domenico Allegri', in New Grove Dictionary, ISBN 0-333-60800-3.
