= Paolo Agostino =

Italian composer and organist (1583–1629)

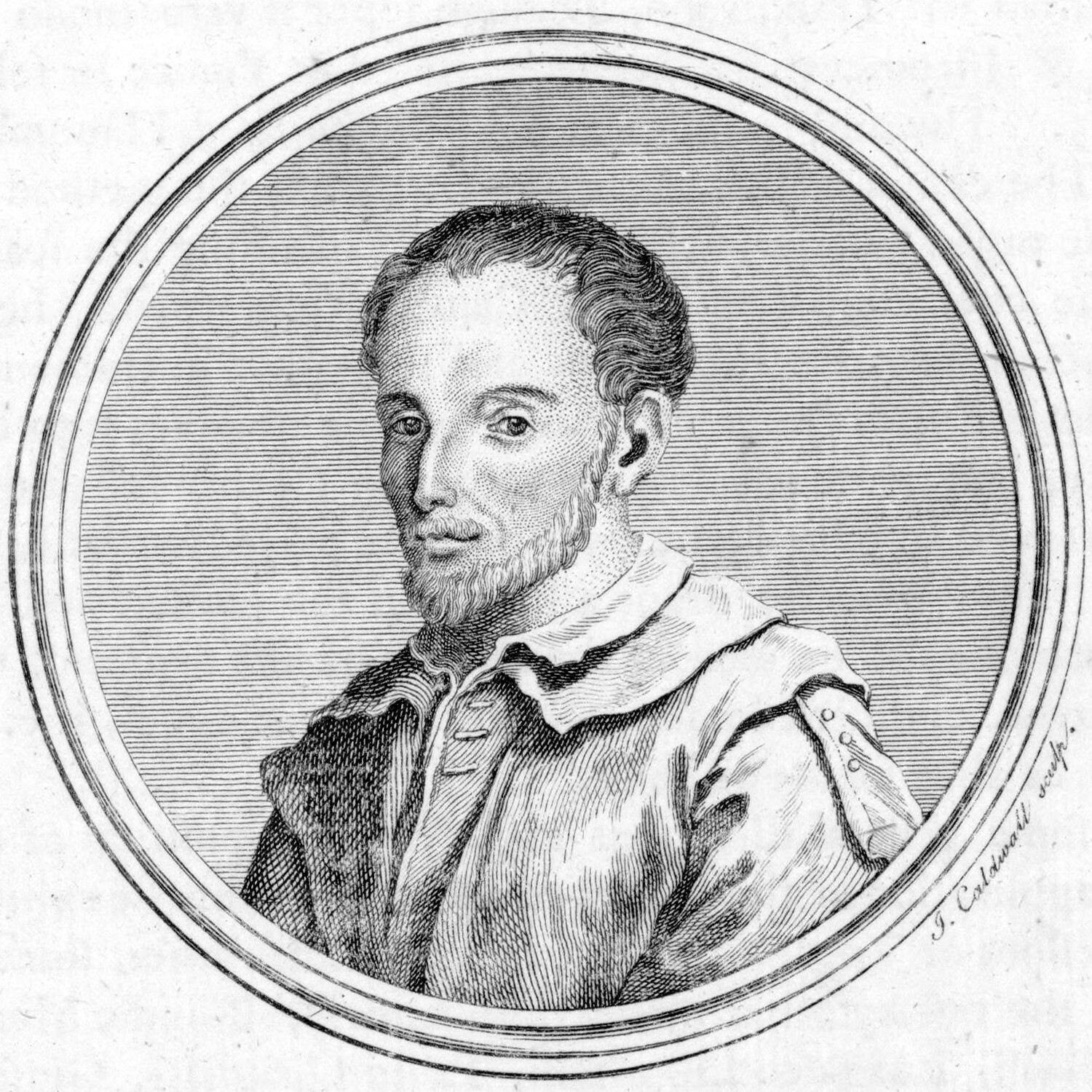
Paolo Agostino, engraving by James Caldwall

Paolo Agostino (or Agostini; Augustinus in Latin; c. 1583 – 1629) was an Italian composer and organist of the early Baroque era. He was born perhaps at Vallerano, near Viterbo. He studied under Giovanni Bernardino Nanino, according to the dedication in the third and fourth books of his masses. Subsequently, he married Nanino's daughter.

He held a series of positions as organist and maestro di cappella (choirmaster) between 1607 and 1626 when he succeeded Vincenzo Ugolini as maestro of the Cappella Giulia's choir in St. Peter's Basilica.

All of his surviving works are sacred music, and most are written in the prima pratica, the conservative polyphonic style of the late 16th century, although some of his motets use some of the new stile concertato. He was a highly sophisticated contrapuntist, often using strict canonic techniques; in addition, he used colorful sonorities, changes of meter between sections, and colorful chromaticism, showing an acquaintanceship with contemporary secular practice as well as the work of the Venetian School. An Agnus Dei for eight voices is especially admired and was used as an example in Padre Martini's Saggio di contrappunto.
