= Nicolas de La Grotte =

French composer and keyboard player

Nicolas de La Grotte (also La Crotte) (1530 – c. 1600) was a French composer and keyboard player of the Renaissance. He was well known as a performer on the organ and on the spinet, as well as a composer of chansons. In addition, he was one of very few French composers of the 16th century with a surviving composition written specifically for the keyboard.

== Life ==
Nothing is known about his early life; the first record of La Grotte's life is from 1557, when he was employed as a keyboard player (organ and spinet) to the King of Navarre, Antoine de Bourbon, at Pau in southwestern France. In 1562 he was given a position with the Duke of Anjou, along with Guillaume Costeley, and when the Duke of Anjou became King Henry III of France in 1574, La Grotte acquired the prestigious post of 'vallet de chambre et organiste ordinaire'.

His reputation as an organist seems to have been high; several writers in the early 1580s, such as La Croix du Maine and Jean Dorat, praised his playing. Between 1586 and 1589 he attempted to purchase land outside of Paris (whether he was successful is not known) and he went to Tours during the 1590 siege of Paris, where he stayed with the as-yet-uncrowned Henry IV of France (Henri de Navarre). The rest of his career and circumstances of his death have not yet been investigated by biographers.

== Music ==
La Grotte was known for his chansons, about 100 of which have survived, and also for his keyboard playing, especially on the organ. While he is known to have written music for the organ, only one composition has survived: a four-part fantasia on the madrigal Ancor che col partire by Cipriano de Rore. This is one of only a handful of French pieces of the 16th century that was written specifically for keyboard. The overwhelming majority of keyboard compositions from 16th-century France are transcriptions of music for voices—especially chansons.

La Grotte's chansons were transitional in style between the mid-century French chanson and the air de cour, which was to be the predominant type of secular vocal music in France around 1600. Many of his chansons feature a prominent melody in the superius part (the highest voice) with a relatively simple chordal accompaniment in the other voices, making them easily transcribable for lute. Indeed, this is exactly what happened to many of them, and in this respect La Grotte's chansons are like the later air de cour, which featured a voice accompanied by a lute. In addition, he combined duple and triple rhythms in irregular patterns, following the declamation of the text, in the manner of the composers writing musique mesurée à l'antique, such as Claude Le Jeune.

The first book of La Grotte's chansons (1569, for four voices) is based on the poetry of Pierre de Ronsard. His later chansons set a variety of poets, and some of the poems are religious, in contrast to the exceedingly secular content of the French chanson of the early and middle 16th century. Unusually for the time, La Grotte seems to have written no music in the specifically sacred forms, including the mass and the motet.

Many of La Grotte's chansons were published again later in arrangements for voice and lute, as airs de cour, under the name of Adrian Le Roy, the famous French music printer.
