= Jean Braconnier =

French singer and composer

Jean Braconnier ("Braconnier dit Lourdault") (died just before January 22, 1512) was a French singer and composer of the Renaissance. Little of his music has survived, but he had a considerable reputation as a singer, and Guillaume Crétin wrote an elegy on his death.

== Life ==
The first record mentioning him is from the court of Duke René II of Lorraine in 1478, and he was still in the area in 1485, since payment records survive showing that he was employed as a singer in Nancy at the chapel of St. Georges between that year and 1506. However he occasionally left for travels. In 1496 he joined the chapel of Philip the Fair of Burgundy, and traveled to Spain in both 1501 and 1506 with Philip. In January 1506 he became a priest.

While in Spain, he was involved in a street brawl, which resulted in the death of one of his attackers. Along with another of the entourage of Philip, he was assaulted by twenty or more armed Spaniards, who had previously harassed him during dinner. According to the account published in the 19th century by Louis Prosper Gachard from anonymous chronicles written during Philip's voyages, the attacking Spaniards were armed with shields, rapiers, and spears, but Braconnier and his companion fought so capably that they deprived some of the attackers of their weapons and injured them with them. After the fight, Braconnier and his companion sought refuge in the Monastery of St. Bernard, not far from Toledo. Queen Joanna of Castile pardoned them because they fought in self-defense, and one of the attackers died after the fight from his wounds.

Braconnier left Spain in September 1506, on the death of Philip, and several months later appeared in France with the singers attached to King Louis XII of France, and went with them to Italy, where Louis was engaged in a military campaign, and he evidently remained with the French court for the rest of his life. The date of his death is inferred from the many documents which involve the disposition of his benefices, which were numerous: evidently he was well liked by both the king and the ecclesiastical powers.

== Music ==
Guillaume Crétin's poem, which also serves as a lament for Antoine de Févin, who died around the same time, indicates his fame as a singer and composer. It also gives the source of his nickname: a chanson, probably by Loyset Compère, called Lourdault, lourdault ("clod, clod"). Only one of Braconnier's compositions has survived with a certain attribution: a chanson, Amours me trocte par la pancé, which is a skillful polyphonic composition in four parts, with an obscene subtext: it contains numerous references to intercourse in various positions, minimally disguised in the text. As with many of the minor composers of the time, many of Braconnier's compositions may have survived either anonymously or misattributed. Braconnier's surviving attributed chanson has been recorded.
