= Mathurin Forestier =

Mathurin Forestier (fl. c. 1500) was a French Renaissance composer.

== Works ==
- Missa L'homme arme
- Missa Baises moy, after the song Baisez Moi attributed to Josquin
- Veni sancte spiritus, formerly attributed to Josquin
