= Erasmo Marotta =

Italian composer

Erasmo Marotta (1576–1641) was a Jesuit Sicilian composer of motets and madrigals. He was born in Randazzo and died in Palermo.

== Editions ==
- Mottetti concertati: a due, tre, quattro e cinque voci ed. Irene Calagna 2002 pp147

== Recordings ==
- Fecit Deus. Quis mihi det. on Fabellae Sacrae. Savadi. 2008
