= Petrus de Domarto =

Franco-Flemish composer

Petrus de Domarto (fl. c. 1445–1455) was a Franco-Flemish composer of the Renaissance. He was a contemporary and probable acquaintance of Ockeghem, and was the composer of at least one of the first unified mass cycles to be written in continental Europe.

== Life ==
Domarto's life is poorly documented. He was listed as a singer at the Church of Our Lady in Antwerp in 1449, five years after Ockeghem was known to be there, and there is evidence he was in Tournai in 1451. He had a high reputation (which makes the lack of documentation on his life curious), but even so was passed over for a post as master of the choirboys (in favor of Paulus Iuvenis). No other documentation on his life has yet come to light.

== Music and reputation ==
Domarto's two mass settings, the Missa Spiritus almus and a Missa sine nomine, were famous at the time. The latter of the two may have been one of the earliest cyclic masses composed on the continent, most likely in the 1440s, and imitates some features of contemporary English composers such as Leonel Power. The Missa Spiritus almus, likely dating from the 1450s, is a cantus-firmus mass, with the melody always in the tenor, but with a changing rhythmic profile as it changes mensuration throughout the piece. The procedure was evidently influential on the next generation of composers, for it was still being copied in the 1480s, and Busnois may have based one of his own masses on the same method (the Missa O crux lignum). The theorist and writer Johannes Tinctoris criticised it for exactly the features that inspired other composers.

The two surviving secular compositions by Domarto are both rondeaux, formes fixes of the type popular with the Burgundian School.

== Works ==
=== Masses ===
1. Missa Spiritus almus (four voices)
2. Missa sine nomine (three voices)

=== Secular ===
Rondeaux, each for three voices:

1. Chelui qui est tant plain de duel
2. Je vis tous jours en esperance
