= Pietro Taglia =

Italian composer

Pietro Taglia (fl. second half of the 16th century) was an Italian composer of the Renaissance, active in Milan, known for his madrigals. Stylistically he was a progressive, following the innovations of more famous composers such as Cipriano de Rore in Venice, and his music was well-known at the time.

== Life ==
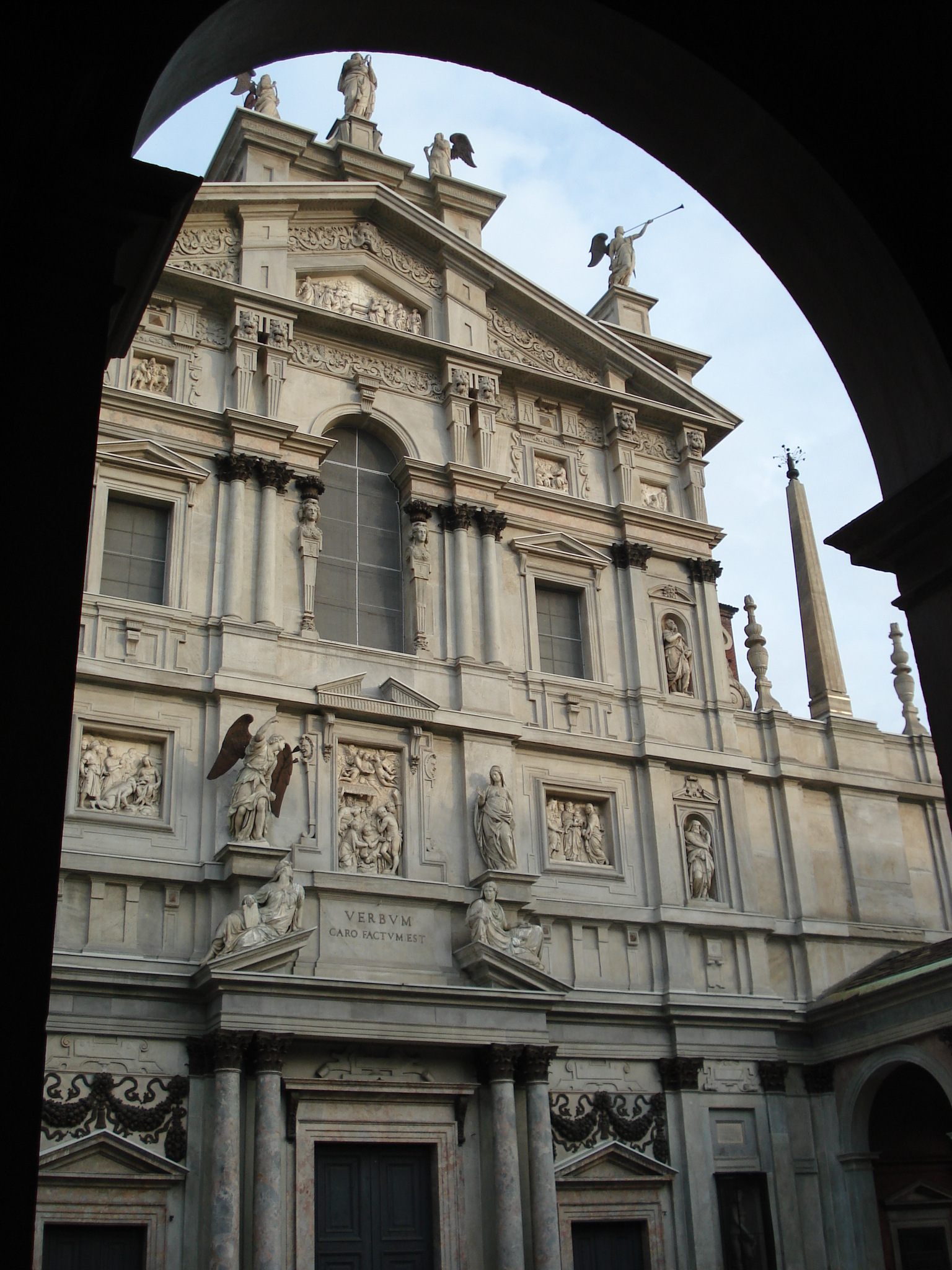
Façade of Santa Maria presso San Celso. Taglia was choirmaster here in 1565

Next to nothing is known about his life but what can be inferred from his publication history and the music itself. Records show that in 1565 he was maestro di cappella, the choirmaster and general music director, at the church of Santa Maria presso San Celso in Milan, at which post he would have been intimately involved with sacred music. Unusually for a maestro di cappella who was a composer, he seems to have written no sacred music at all, or else none has survived. His first book of madrigals was published in Milan in 1555, and his works continued to be published, reprinted, or printed in instrumental versions, until the end of the century.

Taglia had some connection with Venice, but exactly what that connection was is unknown – whether he worked there for a time, made periodic visits, or simply maintained friends there has not been documented. He seems to have been close to the most famous Venetian composer of madrigals of the middle of the 16th century, Cipriano de Rore, since Rore included one of Taglia's madrigals in one of his own publications in 1557, a rare tribute. In addition, Taglia contributed to Venetian poet Manoli Blessi's Greghesche in 1564, probably indicating a commission or request.

According to Alfred Einstein, writing in The Italian Madrigal (1949), Taglia was probably a member of a small society of aristocratic amateurs, as indicated by the unusual care and cost shown in the publication of his two books of madrigals in 1555 and 1557, for four and five voices, works which showed close attention to the progressive trends in other Italian cities not under Spanish rule. At the time Milan was a conquered province, and the resplendent musical and cultural institutions prevalent under the Sforza dynasty had been either neglected or abolished; while sacred music continued to be written in the cathedrals, it was largely in the simple and unadorned style as dictated by the Council of Trent (Carlo Borromeo, who drove many of the Council's reforms, was at that time in Milan). Secular music still managed to flourish in this environment, as both madrigals and instrumental music were popular with the Spanish governors and their attendants.

== Music and influence ==
A total of three publications by Taglia have survived: the first book of madrigals for four voices (published by the brothers Francesco and Simone Moscheni in Milan, 1555), and the first and second books of madrigals for five voices (Francesco Moscheni, Milan, 1557; Venice, 1564). Other madrigals appear individually both in publications elsewhere and in instrumental versions.

Taglia preferred to set poetry by the finest and most famous poets, such as Petrarch and Ariosto. In his works he used extreme contrast between chromatic and diatonic passages, as well as between quick and slow motion; he was careful to set his texts with appropriate expression and declamation. Einstein said of him, "Taglia was himself a genius of a high order, and as such, an independent thinker." The continued appearance of reprints and instrumental versions of his madrigals until about 1600 attests to Taglia's fame.
