= Pierre Vermont =

French composer

Pierre Vermont (l’aîné, primus, Vermond seniorem; c. 1495 – before February 22, 1533) was a French composer of the Renaissance, associated with the Sainte-Chapelle. Twelve of his works have survived, including seven motets and five chansons.

== Biography ==
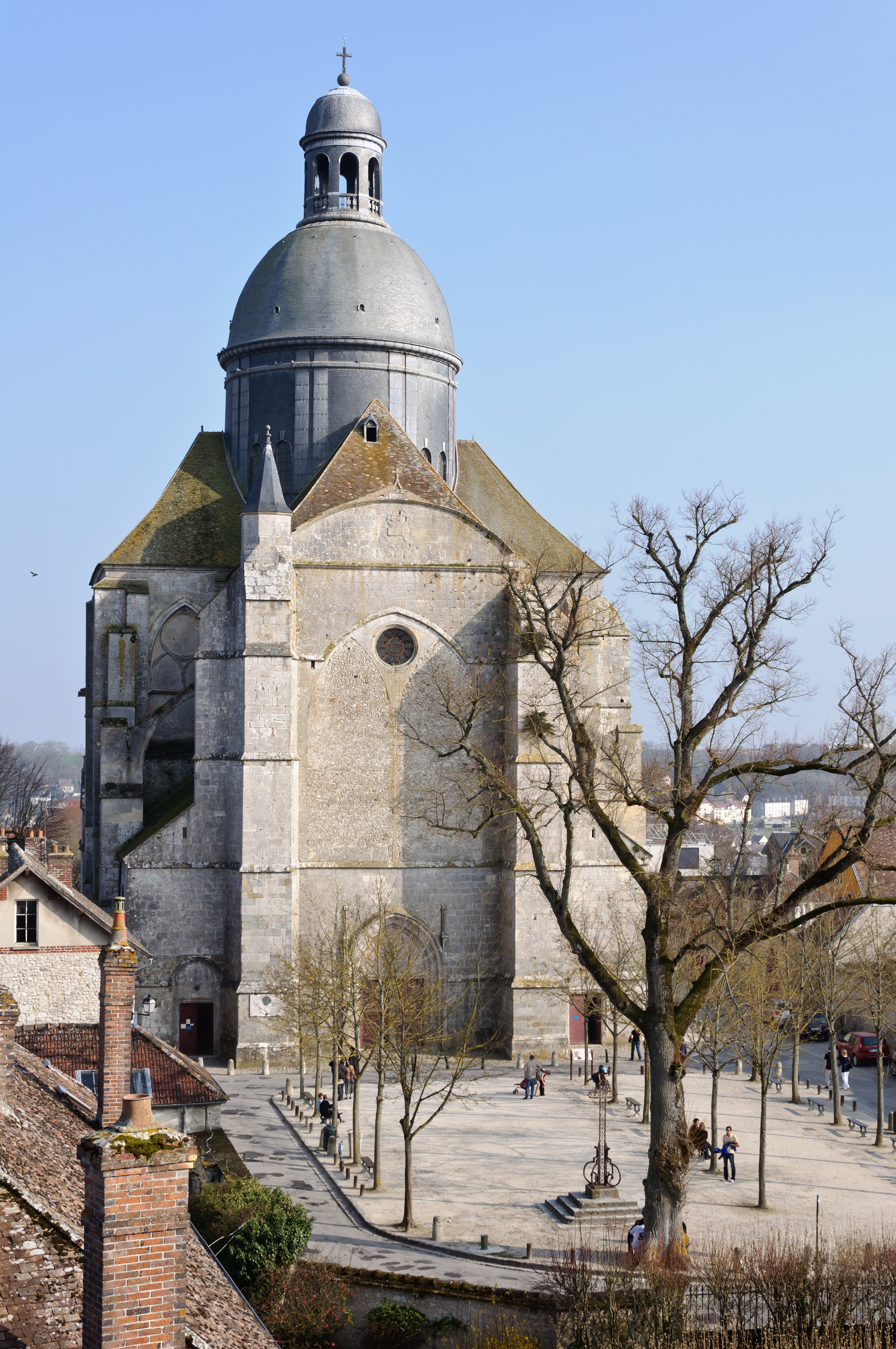
Saint-Quirace in Provins, where Vermont held a position in the 1520s

There were two closely connected composers named Vermont, of whom Pierre was possibly the elder, and a Pernot Vermont (c.1495–1558) possibly younger, but not by much. Musicologists have not been able to establish a family relationship, although it seems likely. That Pierre was the elder of the two, even though their conjectured birthdates are similar, is inferred from his appellation (l’aîné, primus, or Vermond seniorem). All of the music assigned simply to 'Vermont' in the sources has been attributed to Pierre rather than Pernot.

A birthdate for Pierre is estimated based on the record of his being a choirboy in Sainte-Chapelle at the beginning of 1510 as one of a group of only six who sang treble for royalty, and his subsequent departure to complete his education at the end of the next year, probably when his voice broke. In 1512 he assisted in the performance of the daily liturgy at Sainte-Chapelle as a cleric, and in the early 1520s he became the singing master there. Upon the resignation of a chaplain at Saint Quiriace in Provins, Louise of Savoy gave him the chantry there. At this time he was singing bass, and seems to have retained his position as music master at Sainte-Chapelle until late 1527, and continued singing in the royal choir until his death, which occurred sometime before February 22, 1533.

== Music ==
Seven of his motets have survived, as well as one which has now been attributed to Jacquet of Mantua. They are for four or five voices, and use the principle of pervading imitation throughout, with two using a cantus firmus with a separate text, an archaic technique by the early 16th century. They lack the contrasts of texture – switches from polyphonic to homophonic writing, and dense to sparse vocal groupings – which can be found in the music of his contemporaries. Vermont's chansons, all for four voices, also favor imitative textures.

François Rabelais mentions Vermont in the prologue to Book IV of Gargantua and Pantagruel, as one of a group of the most famous singers of the age, performing a bawdy song for Priapus.
