= Jan Rijspoort =

16th-century Flemish composer

Jan Rijspoort was a Flemish composer who was active at the end of Renaissance and beginning of the early Baroque period. He worked in the Spanish Netherlands at the end of the 16th century and the beginning of the 17th century. Very little is known about his life.

== The songs collected in the Morale Spreeckwoorden ==
This collection was published in 1617 by the Antwerp publisher Phalesius. A complete copy of this work, containing polyphonic Dutch songs, has yet to be discovered.
