= Biquardus =

Biquardus (also Wiquardus, Giquardus and Guiquardus) (fl. c. 1440 – 1450) was a composer, most likely from the Picardy province of France. Three of his works can be found in the St. Emmeram Choirbook, although they may simply be contrafacta (new text to old music). These are In excelsis te laudant, Ave stella matutina, and Resurexit victor mortis. He is probably not related to the English composer Pycard, but may be the same as Arnold Pickar, a cleric and cantor for Frederick III, Holy Roman Emperor.
