= William à Court =

William à Court may refer to:

- Sir William à Court, 1st Baronet (c. 1747–1817), British soldier and Member of Parliament
- William à Court, 1st Baron Heytesbury (1779–1860), British diplomat and Conservative politician
- William à Court-Holmes, 2nd Baron Heytesbury (1809–1891), British peer and Conservative Member of Parliament
- William Ashe-à Court (c. 1708–1781), British military commander and Member of Parliament
