= Francesco Cellavenia =

Italian composer

Francesco Cellavenia (fl. c. 1538 – 1563) was an Italian composer of the Renaissance, active in Casale Monferrato.

Little is known about his life, and the few details once thought secure are contested. He may have been from Cilavegna, a town near Pavia, judging by his name, and he likely spent a large portion of his career in Casale Monferrato, a town in northwestern Italy. He may have been maestro di cappella at the cathedral there, or perhaps held a similar post at S Maria di Piazza.

The cathedral in Casale Monferrato possesses several important manuscripts which contain the surviving work by Cellavenia. One of the manuscripts, Casale Monferrato, Duomo, Archivio Capitolare, D (F), includes seven compositions by Cellavenia out of a total of sixty-six compositions, mostly motets (other composers with works in the collection include Jean Mouton, Jean Richafort, Jacquet of Mantua, Cristóbal de Morales, and others). Another manuscript, I-CMac (N)(H), has four motets by Cellavenia. Both were copied in the period from 1538 to 1545.

Cellavenia's music shows a mixture of Italian elements and stylistic traits of the Franco-Flemish composers from the north. Many of his motets are based on pre-existing material: canti firmi are drawn from composers such as Richafort and Andreas da Silva, composers who are, not surprisingly, represented in the same manuscripts which contain his work – he was familiar with their music from his work at the cathedral. Others of his motets are based on Gregorian chants.

His complete works, edited by David Crawford, are in volume 80 of Corpus mensurabilis musicae (1978).
