= Mikołaj z Chrzanowa =

Polish composer and organist (1485–1562)

Mikołaj z Chrzanowa (1485–1562) was a Polish composer and organist of the Renaissance.

Little is known about his early life, but he was a student at the Kraków Academy in 1507, receiving his baccalaureate in 1513. In 1518 he became organist at Wawel Cathedral, a post he held until his death. In addition to his duties as an organist, he directed the cathedral choir—the Kapela Rorantystów—and supervised the construction of organs (for example, he traveled to Biecz in 1543 to oversee the work there).

His only known work is a motet, Protexisti me, Deus, which survives in tablature notation in the 16th-century Wawel Part-Books. A later organ tablature of the same composition appears in the Łowicz Organ Tablature of 1580, with the initials N.Ch. which are presumed to indicate the composer.
