= Antoine de Bertrand =

French composer of the Renaissance

Antoine de Bertrand (also Anthoine) (1530/1540 – probably 1581) was a French composer of the Renaissance. Early in his life he was a prolific composer of secular chansons, and late in his life he wrote hymns and canticles, under the influence of the Jesuits. He was murdered by Protestants during the French Wars of Religion.

== Life ==
Details of his life are relatively scanty for an otherwise prominent composer of the period, probably because he never held a salaried position as a musician at an establishment whose records have survived. He was born at Fontanges, in Auvergne, and from about 1560 he lived in Toulouse. Details of his death are not known, but that he was martyred for his Jesuit-inspired songs by Protestants is attested by several writers of the time. According to Michel Coyssard, writing in 1608, he was traveling between Toulouse and one of the farms he managed when he was attacked and killed.

== Music and influence ==
Bertrand published three large books of chansons between 1576 and 1578, and, two years later, two books of sacred music (a third was published posthumously, in 1582). A total of 83 chansons and one Italian madrigal have survived of his secular music, and one chanson spirituelle, in French, 10 hymns in Latin, 14 canticles, and three Latin motets, of his sacred music (Dobbins 2005). Most of his music is for four unaccompanied voices. He wrote in the preface to his first book of chansons (1576) that he intended to publish five or six books in total, including many pieces which he wrote much earlier in his life; this would seem to indicate that about half of his music has not survived (Dobbins 2005).

His first two volumes of chansons are for four voices, and are settings of the Amours of Pierre de Ronsard, poems which describe the stages and incidents in a love affair gone sour. Some of the harmonic language used in the chansons is daring, and approaches the experimental level of Vicentino; Bertrand uses microtones, including quarter-tones, as an expressive device in two of the pieces from the second book (1578). The most extreme example of this is the last seventeen measures of the chanson Je suis tellement amoureux, in which Bertrand completely avoids diatonic writing, using "only chromatic and enharmonic, with no mixture of diatonicism except in an interval in the bassecontre and another in the hautecontre, made to express the word 'death'" (Reese 1954, 389) However, in a later edition of the same songs (published posthumously in 1587) his publisher removed the dots used as microtone accidentals; evidently they were either too hard to sing, or the notation was too unfamiliar. In the preface he also mentions that music is best when it appeals to the senses, and avoids mathematical subtleties.

Although Bertrand only wrote one Italian madrigal—actually a villanella—he was clearly influenced in his chanson-writing by the Italian concern for text-painting and careful underlining of words and phrases with appropriate and symbolic melodic and harmonic material. He was careful to use contrasting textures and meters, for example switching from duple to triple meter several times during the course of a composition.

Bertrand's sacred works, contained in his three publications of Airs spirituels and sonets chrestiens, are closely related stylistically to the contemporary psalm-settings by the Huguenots: they are simple both melodically and harmonically, and usually maintain a homophonic texture throughout. The melodies are mostly from Gregorian chant. Except for the origin of their tunes, they are very similar to some of the psalm settings by the Huguenot composer Claude Goudimel, who had been killed by Catholics in the St. Bartholomew's Day Massacre a decade earlier.

== Works ==
=== Sacred ===
- Premier livre de sonets chrestiens mis en musique (4vv, Lyon, 1580)
- Second livre de sonets chrestiens mis en musique (4vv, Lyon, 1580)
- Airs spirituels contenant plusieurs hymnes et cantiques (4vv and 5vv, Paris, 1582)

=== Secular ===
- Les amours de Pierre de Ronsard (4vv, 1576) (second edition 1578) (contains 35 chansons)
- Second livre des amours de Pierre de Ronsard (4vv, 1578) (total of 25 chansons)
- Tiers livre de chansons (4vv, 1578)
- Three chansons also published separately in 1570
