= Jacob Godebrye =

Franco-Flemish singer and composer

Jacotin or Jacob Godebrye (died 24 March 1529) was a Franco-Flemish singer and composer. He was born in Flanders between 1440 and 1450, and was the choral vicar at the collegiale of Antwerp, became a chaplain and later took orders. From 1479 to 1528 he was a singer at Onze Lieve Vrouw (Notre Dame) in Antwerp. He was a contrapuntist, and his motets, chansons and masses were published in several extant collections. He died at Antwerp.
