= Lorenzo Allegri =

Italian composer and lutenist

Lorenzo Allegri (1567 – 1648) was an Italian composer, who worked at the Medici court, in Florence. He was mainly known as a lutenist, and for lute he wrote dances, sometimes with vocal parts. He was sometimes referred to as Lorenzino Todesco or Tedesco so it may be assumed he was of German origin.
