= Pomponio Allegri =

Italian painter

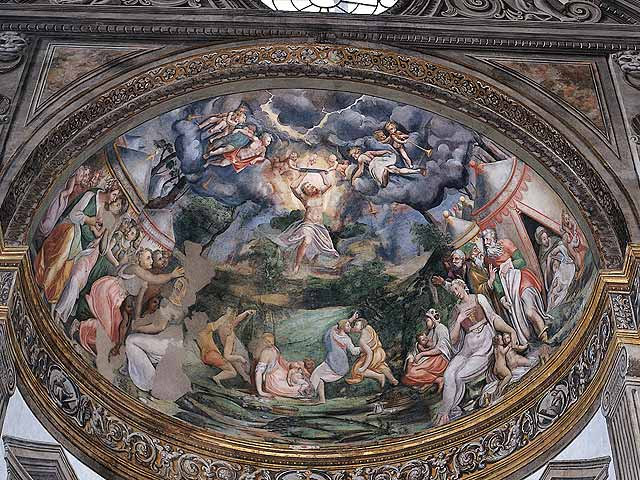
Moses on Mount Sinai, fresco at the Cathedral of Parma, 1560-1562

Pomponio Allegri (1521 – fl. 1593) was an Italian painter, the son of Correggio.

== Life ==
Pomponio was the son of Antonio Allegri da Correggio, and studied the first rudiments of art under his father before Correggio's death when he was thirteen years of age. He is said to have continued his studies after Correggio's death, under Francesco Maria Rondani the ablest disciple of his father.

Pomponio inherited a considerable fortune from his father and grandfather, and appears for some time to have held a good position in the town of Correggio. He afterwards, however, sold most of his landed property, and his affairs became involved. He received many important commissions. One of his altarpieces, showing the influence of his father, is in the Academy of Fine Arts of Parma. It represents Moses showing the Israelites the Tables of the Law. Other works are in various churches. He sometimes signed himself Pomponio Laeti, Latinizing the name of Allegri, as his father also did occasionally. He was still alive in 1593.
