= Acourt =

French composer

Acourt was a French composer who flourished sometime during the first half of the 15th century. Only two chansons (in a style typical of c.1430) by the composer survive from a 15th-century manuscript, MS. Canon. Misc. 213, housed at the Bodleian Library. His best known work is the chanson Je demande ma bienvenue which was first published in John Stainer's Early Bodleian music: Dufay and his contemporaries (Novello, 1898). Musicologist Elizabeth Randell Upton provides a thorough analysis of the chanson in Music and Performance in the Later Middle Ages (Palgrave Macmillan, 2013). John S. Beckett and Michael Morrow's ensemble Musica Reservata recorded Je demande ma bienvenue on their LP Music from the Hundred Years War (Philips Records, 1969). More recently the chanson has been included in concerts by the early music group Armonia Nova.

Nothing is known about the life of Acourt. There is some speculation that Acourt may be another name for the French composer Johannes de Alte Curie Haucourt (fl. 1390-after 1416). However, musicologist Reinhard Strohm says this theory is very unlikely as Acourt's chansons have little similarity to the surviving works by Haucourt.
