= Robert de Févin =

French composer

Robert de Févin (late 15th and early 16th centuries) was a French composer of the Renaissance. He was the brother of Antoine de Févin, a considerably more famous composer at the court of Louis XII of France. Whether he was older or younger than Antoine is not known.

Little is known about his life, except that either he was born in Cambrai or Arras, the birthplace of his brother, and his father was an alderman in Arras in 1474. He held the post of maître de chapelle (chorus master) in Cambrai, to the dukes of Savoy, sometime around 1500; he may even have been born there. References to the "brothers Févin" as composers can be found from the time. Robert may have died before about 1518, as evidenced by a memorial note written on a copy of his Missa la sol mi fa re, which was probably copied around that year.

He wrote masses, motets and lamentations, though little of his work has survived. Three masses, a four-voice credo from a mass (the rest of which has been lost), two settings of the Lamentations of Jeremiah, one five-voice Marian antiphon (Alma Redemptoris mater), and the music of a six-voice motet (with the text absent) are all that survives of his work. Stylistically it is similar enough to his brother Antoine's music that several of Robert's pieces have been misattributed to Antoine. Robert evidently emulated the style of Josquin, copying not only the smooth polyphony of the more famous composer but basing two of his masses directly on works by him.

Some of Févin's music can be found in the Medici Codex of 1518.
