= Jean Maillard =

French composer

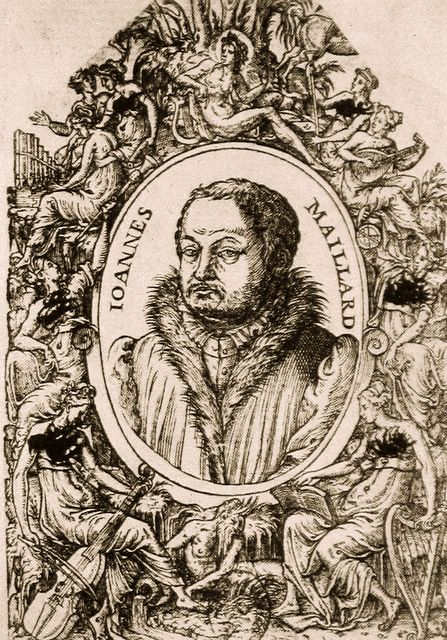
Jean Maillard; portrait from Le Roy & Ballard's publications of his two volumes of motets, 1565

Jean Maillard (c. 1515 – after 1570) was a French composer of the Renaissance.

While little is known with certainty about his life, he may have been associated with the French royal court, since he wrote at least one motet for them. Most likely he lived and worked in Paris, based on evidence of his print editions, which were prepared there. Since later in his career he set verse by Huguenot poet Guillaume Guéroult, as well as Clément Marot, he may have either become a Protestant or had Protestant sympathies; this could explain his disappearance from Paris around 1570. If he did leave the city then, his destination is unknown. No record of him after that year has been found.

Maillard is mentioned by Rabelais in Gargantua and Pantagruel, and also by Ronsard in his Livre des Mélanges (1560 and 1572). He was evidently famous during his time, and many of his motets were used as source material for parody masses by composers as distinguished as Palestrina; in addition Lassus reworked some of his music. Claude Goudimel also used a secular chanson of Maillard's as source material for a mass.

Six of Maillard's masses have survived, and two others are known to have been lost. Considerable other music of his has survived in printed editions, including eighty-six motets, settings of the Magnificat, lamentations, chansons spirituelles, and secular chansons. Stylistically, his sacred music is more closely related to the contemporary Franco-Flemish idiom of pervasive, dense, complex polyphony than to the relatively clear and succinct style of his fellow French composers. In particular, he used short motifs in close imitation, and often used strict canonic devices. About half of his motets are for four voices; the rest are for five or six, with one motet for seven voices. Many of his motets have the cantus firmus in long note values in the highest voice, while the other voices carry on in a polyphonic, imitative texture.

His Missa pro mortuis was an early Requiem mass setting, and one of the only examples from France in the 16th century.

Unlike his sacred music, his secular music was in the prevailing popular idiom of the 1540s.

== Modern editions ==
Maillard's sacred works are being edited for publication by Raymond H. Rosenstock. His editions of motets already published several years ago by A-R Editions in the USA provide useful further information and authoritative modern transcriptions; he has also edited Maillard's masses, published by The Institute of Mediaeval Music in Canada.

== References and further reading ==
- Article "Jean Maillard (i)", in The New Grove Dictionary of Music and Musicians, ed. Stanley Sadie. 20 vol. London, Macmillan Publishers Ltd., 1980. ISBN 1-56159-174-2
- Gustave Reese, Music in the Renaissance. New York, W.W. Norton & Co., 1954. ISBN 0-393-09530-4
- Marie-Alexis Colin, Frank Dobbins: "Jean Maillard", Grove Music Online ed. L. Macy (Accessed September 11, 2005)
