= Adrian Le Roy =

French musician and music educator

Adrian Le Roy (c.1520–1598) was an influential French music publisher, lutenist, mandore player, guitarist, composer and music educator.

== Life ==
Le Roy was born in the town of Montreuil-sur-Mer in northern France to a wealthy family. Very little is known about his formative years, but he was probably a chorister and studied the lute, guitar and cittern with various teachers.

He became an accomplished musician and entered the service of, first, Claude de Clermont, then, Jacques II (Baron de Semblançay and Viscount of Tours), both members of the aristocracy who had influence at court. In 1546 he met the publisher Jean de Brouilly in Paris and married his daughter Denise de Brouilly.

Le Roy and his cousin Robert Ballard (c.1525–1588) founded the printing firm "Le Roy & Ballard", and in August 1551 obtained a royal privilege from Henry II to print music. The music movable type was supplied by Guillaume Le Bé. In February 1553, the company was awarded the title of "Imprimeur du Roi en musique" (previously held by Pierre Attaignant). This office, which was renewed by successive monarchs, gave the company legal protection against competitors and commercially valuable prestige. Royal patronage was a major factor in the company's success since it ensured both a ready supply of new music from the court musicians and a market for its publications. Over the following two decades other rival companies dropped out of the market and from the 1570s onwards Le Roy & Ballard enjoyed a virtual monopoly in music publishing.

While Robert Ballard looked after the business side, Le Roy assumed the role of an artistic director. He achieved renown as a composer and arranger of songs and instrumentals, his published work including at least six books of tablature for the lute, five volumes for the guitar and arrangements for the cittern. Le Roy also helped to ensure the success of composer Orlande de Lassus, introducing him to court and publishing his music.

After the death of Ballard, his widow ran the Ballard side of the partnership until their son Pierre was ready to take over. Le Roy died in Paris in 1598 after which the business continued under the name Ballard. Despite losing its monopoly, the publishing house lasted to the 19th century.

== Some Published Works ==
Le Roy's book L'Instruction pour la mandore gives modern historians hints as to the instrument's origins and design. Although lost now, Pierre Trichet commented on things he read in Le Roy's book that tell us the instrument came to France by way of Navarre and Biscay. Trichet also lets us know that Le Roy, the author of a mandore method book, did own the instrument which he wrote about.

- Premier Livre de Tablature de Luth (1551).
- Briefve et facile instruction (1551).
- Tiers Livre de Tablature de Luth (1552).
- Cinquiesme Livre de Guiterre (1554).
- Second Livre de Guiterre (1556).
- Instruction de Luth (1557).
- Sixiesme Livre de Luth (1559).
- A Briefe and Easye Instru[c]tion to Learne the Tableture to Conducte and Dispose the Hande unto the Lute (1568; 2nd ed. 1574); English translation by Alford.
- Livre d'air de cours miz sur le Luth (1571): Solo songs with lute accompaniments.
- Les Instructions pour le Luth (1574)
- L'Instruction pour la mandore (1585)

== Bibliography ==
- Keith Calmes: Guitar Music of the 16th Century (Pacific, Missouri: Mel Bay, 2008), pp. 46 ff.
- James Harr: European Music, 1520-1640 (Martlesham, Surrey: The Boydell Press, 2006)), p. 172 ff.
- François Lesure & Geneviève Thibault: Bibliographie des éditions musicales d'Adrian Le Roy et Robert Ballard, 1551–1598 (Paris: Société française de musicologie / Heugel, 1955; reprint: Paris: Bibliothèque nationale de France, 2002).
- James Tyler & Paul Sparks: The Guitar and its Music: From the Renaissance to the Classical Era (Oxford: Oxford University Press, 2007), p. 17 ff.
