= Giovanni Maria Nanino =

Italian composer (1544–1607)

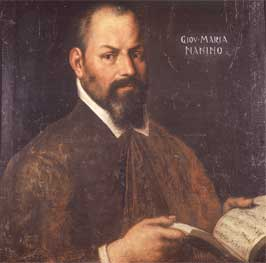
Giovanni Maria Nanino

Giovanni Maria Nanino (also Nanini; 1543 or 1544 – 11 March 1607) was an Italian composer and teacher of the late Renaissance. He was a member of the Roman School of composers, and was the most influential music teacher in Rome in the late 16th century. He was the older brother of composer Giovanni Bernardino Nanino.

== Life ==
Nanino was born in Tivoli, and served as a boy soprano in the cathedral at Viterbo. In the 1560s he probably studied with Palestrina at San Luigi de' Francesi in Rome; at any rate, he became maestro di cappella there after Palestrina left. In 1577, he joined the papal choir as a tenor, and remained in the choir for the rest of his life, occasionally taking the rotating post of maestro di cappella.

During the 1590s, he was renowned as a teacher; he and his brother established what is thought to be the first Italian-run public music school in Rome and many future composers studied with him and sang in his choirs, including Felice Anerio, Antonio Brunelli, Antonio Cifra and Gregorio Allegri (composer of the famous Miserere).

== Works ==
Nanino's output as a composer was not large, but it was distinguished, and his music—especially his madrigals—were extremely popular at the time. Almost no collections of madrigals were published in Rome which did not include at least one contribution by Nanino, often in the most prominent position in the book—even ahead of Palestrina. Stylistically his madrigals are extremely varied. While not as comprehensive as Marenzio, who after all wrote more than 500 madrigals, Nanino's examples of the genre vary from the highly serious, angular and contrapuntal, to the lightest canzonette; in expressive intensity he is sometimes compared to Marenzio.

In addition to his famous madrigals, he wrote motets, settings of the Lamentations, canons, and sacred songs. As of 1980, no complete edition of his works had been prepared, and much of his music remained in manuscript.

== Sources and further reading ==
- Reese, Gustave (1954). Music in the Renaissance. New York: W.W. Norton & Co. ISBN 0-393-09530-4.
- "Giovanni Maria Nanino". The New Grove Dictionary of Music and Musicians. London: Macmillan Publishers. 1980. ISBN 1-56159-174-2.
