= Sandrin =

French composer

Sandrin (Pierre Regnault) (c. 1490 – after 1561) was a French composer of the Renaissance. He was a prolific composer of chansons in the middle of the 16th century, some of which were extremely popular and widely distributed.

== Life ==
He was probably born in St. Marcel, not far from Paris, though details of his early life are incomplete. He was a choirboy at the French royal court in 1506, and in 1517 was a singer for Louise of Savoy. From then until 1539 his name is absent from all records at the court, but other records suggest he may have been working as an actor during this time. By 1539 he was again at the French royal court, this time singing in the royal chapel itself; and within a few years he had established a reputation as one of the most noted composers of chansons in France, along with Claudin de Sermisy.

He went to Italy sometime in the early 1550s, and is known to have been maestro di cappella for the Ferrarese Este family at Siena, in 1554. By 1560 he had returned to Paris, though probably only briefly, for he came to settle a family estate, and by the next year he was in Italy again, this time in Rome. He disappears from the records at this point, and probably died in 1561 or shortly after, most likely in Italy.

== Music ==
Sandrin apparently only wrote secular music, and only chansons, although as is the case with many composers of the era there is always the possibility that much of his music was lost. All of his music is vocal, and all for four voices.

Stylistically, Sandrin's music resembles that of Claudin de Sermisy, the more famous composer of Parisian chansons, although Sandrin's blends Italian influences with the native French style. His chansons tend to be homophonic, with occasional contrapuntal detail, but the later ones employ many of the rhythmic devices common in Italian secular music of the period, particularly the frottola, and also are filled with madrigalisms such as word-painting.

One of his chansons, Doulce memoire, became one of the most popular pieces of the entire 16th century, and exists in countless copies and arrangements in sources in many countries; it was a particular favorite of lutenists and keyboard players.

== Recording ==
- 2005 - Priest and Bon Vivant. Sounds of the City of Louvain from the 16th Century. Works by Clemens non Papa and his contemporaries. Capilla Flamenca, La Caccia and Jan van Outryve. Etc. 1287. Contains a recording of Elas amy by Sandrin.
