= Antoine de Févin =

Franco-Flemish composer

Antoine de Févin (ca. 1470 – late 1511 or early 1512) was a Franco-Flemish composer of the Renaissance. He was active at the same time as Josquin des Prez, and shares many traits with his more famous contemporary.

== Life ==
Févin was most likely born in Arras then in the Burgundian state, the son of an alderman. His brother Robert de Févin was also a composer. Most likely Antoine left Arras in the late 1480s, though there is no evidence that he went to Italy, the commonest destination for Franco-Flemish composers of the time. In the 1490s it is likely he became a priest (although there is no known documentation of that today), and he also may have obtained a master's degree at a university, since he is commonly known as maistre later in his life. By 1507, he was working as a singer and composer in the chapelle royale for Louis XII of France, who praised him highly. He died at Blois.

The Swiss music theorist and biographer Heinrich Glarean, writing in 1547, noted that Févin was a follower of Josquin, and that he died young; he also mentioned him as being a composer of Orleans, though this most likely referred to the association of that city with the court of Louis XII.

== Works ==
All of Févin's surviving music is vocal. He wrote masses, motets and chansons. Stylistically his music is similar to Josquin's in its clarity of texture and design, and its relatively progressive nature: Févin evidently wrote in the most current styles, adopting the method of contrasting imitative sections with homophonic sections which came into prominence around 1490. Unlike Josquin, he was less concerned with the careful setting of text than with formal structure; his setting of individual words is occasionally clumsy, though his larger-scale structures are easy to follow. He also particularly liked the device of using vocal duets to contrast with the full sonority of the choir.

Some of Févin's music uses the technique of free contrapuntal fantasy, later perfected by Josquin, where strict imitation is absent; fragments of a cantus firmus pervade the texture, giving a feeling of overall unity and complete equality of all the voices.

Of his music, 14 masses (one of which is a Requiem Mass), 3 lamentations, 3 Magnificats, 14 motets and 17 chansons survive.

== Sources ==
- Articles "Antoine de Févin" and "Robert de Févin," in The New Grove Dictionary of Music and Musicians, ed. Stanley Sadie. 20 vol. London, Macmillan Publishers Ltd., 1980. ISBN 1-56159-174-2
- Gustave Reese, Music in the Renaissance. New York, W.W. Norton & Co., 1954. ISBN 0-393-09530-4
