= Pierre Attaingnant =

French music printer

Pierre Attaingnant or Attaignant (c. 1494 – late 1551 or 1552) was a French music publisher, active in Paris. He was one of the first to print music by single-impression printing, greatly reducing the labor involved, and he published music by more than 150 composers.

== Life ==
Attaingnant learned the printing trade by printing first "livres d'heure" with the printer Philippe Pigouchet who sold them to Simon Vostre book shop located in St John the evangelist street near the Sorbonne University in the Parisian student district. Later Pigouchet became Attaingnant's father-in-law when Attaingnant married his daughter.

Attaingnant published over 1500 chansons by many different composers, including Paris composers Claudin de Sermisy, Pierre Sandrin and Pierre Certon, and most prominently Clément Janequin with five books of chansons by Josquin Desprez . Attaingnant acquired royal privileges for his music books, which were renewed many times. In 1537, he was named imprimeur et libraire du Roy en musique (printer and bookseller of the King for music) for Francis I of France.

== Works ==
Attaingnant's major contribution to music printing consists in his popularizing the single-impression method for music printing, which he first employed in his 1528 publication Chansons nouvelles en musique à quatre parties, a book of chansons. In this system, the individual notes were printed directly onto segments of staff, and so the notes, staff lines, and text could all be printed with one send through the printing press. The main disadvantage of this method was the alignment of the staff lines, which often had a “bumpy” look—-some being slightly higher or slightly disjointed from others. Nevertheless, this method became standard music printing across Europe in the 16th and 17th centuries.

Though Attaingnant is often credited with being the first to develop this technique, one scholar has suggested that John Rastell, an English printer in London, was the first to use single-impression printing in 1520. Attaingnant's biographer Daniel Heartz, in contrast, analyzed the printer's inventory records and other documents and concluded that Attaingnant's claims of inventing the technique were likely true.

Apart from his 36 collections of chansons, he also published books with pieces in lute or keyboard tablature, as well as Masses and motets.

Among the most important documents for keyboard music in general and for French Renaissance keyboard music in particular are the seven volumes published by Attaingnant in Paris in the spring of 1531:

1. Dixneuf chansons musicales reduictes en la tabulature des Orgues Espinettes Manichordions, et telz semblables instrumentz musicaulx... Idibus Januraii 1530 (sic).
2. Vingt et cinq chansons musicales reduictes en la tabulature des Orgues Espinettes Manichordions, et telz semblables instrumentz musicaulx... Kal. 1530 (sic).
3. Vingt et six chansons musicales reduictes en la tabulature des Orgues Espinettes Manichordions, et telz semblables instrumentz musicaulx... Non. Frebruaii 1530 (sic).
4. Quatorze Gaillardes neuf Pavennes, sept Branles et deux Basses Dances le tout reduict de musique en la tabulature du jeu d'Orgues Espinettes Manicordions et telz semblables instrumentz musicaulx... (February 1531 ?).
5. Tabulature pour le jeu d’Orgues, Espinettes et Manicordions sur le plain chant de Cunctipotens et Kyrie Fons. Avec leurs Et in terra, Patrem, Sanctus et Agnus Dei... (March 1531).
6. Magnificat sur les huit tons avec Te Deum laudamus et deux Preludes, le tout mys en tabulature des Orgues Espinettes et Manicordions, et telz semblables instrumentz... Kal. Martii 1530.
7. Treze Motetz musicaulx avec ung Prelude, le tout reduict en la Tabulature des Orgues Espinettes et Manicordions et telz semblables instrumentz... Kal. Aprilis 1531.

== Legacy ==
Of Attaingnant's publications, 111 are known to have survived to the present day, and they form an important source of information about sixteenth-century music.
