= Giovanni Bernardino Nanino =

Italian composer (c.1560–1623)

Giovanni Bernardino Nanino (ca. 1560 – 1623) was an Italian composer, teacher and singing master of the late Renaissance and early Baroque eras, and a leading member of the Roman School of composers. He was the younger brother of the somewhat more influential composer Giovanni Maria Nanino.

== Life ==
Born in Vallerano, he was first a boy soprano in the local cathedral, just like his brother. His first post may have been as maestro di cappella at Santa Maria dei Monti in 1588, and he is known to have acquired the post of maestro di cappella at San Luigi dei Francesi in Rome in 1591, after his brother left to join the papal choir. The two brothers, however, were living together at this time in a house owned by the church, and spent a good deal of their time teaching choirboys. Following the appointment at San Luigi dei Francesi, he was associated with Cardinal Montalto, a wealthy and influential patron of art and music, and may have served as teacher, composer, and archivist for the Cardinal at his church, San Lorenzo in Damaso.

== Works ==
Nanino's music of the 1580s and 1590s is conservative in idiom, avoiding the experimental tendencies of his brother and Marenzio, preferring instead to incorporate the technique and expressive style of the earlier Roman composers such as Palestrina. After about 1610 he adopted the technique of basso continuo in his sacred works — hardly a conservative tendency — and, significantly, something his brother never did. Much of his earlier music is secular (such as madrigals), but he published several books of motets after 1610, after his brother's death. It is tempting to speculate that when he wrote music in the same format as his brother, he chose opposite stylistic means, and after his brother's death he quickly adopted the progressive style of the time, using it to write music in the same forms which his brother had used more conservatively.

== Sources, further reading ==
- Reese, Gustave (1954). Music in the Renaissance. New York: W.W. Norton & Co. ISBN 0-393-09530-4.
- Bukofzer, Manfred (1947). Music in the Baroque Era. New York: W.W. Norton & Co. ISBN 0-393-09745-5.
- "Giovanni Bernardino Nanino". The New Grove Dictionary of Music and Musicians. London: Macmillan Publishers. 1980. ISBN 1-56159-174-2.
