= Jean Boyer (composer) =

Jean Boyer (born before 1600 – died 1648) was a French viol player and composer, active in Paris during the first half of the 17th century.

He must not be confused with Noël Boyer, who was master of the music of the Duchess of Savoy and who in 1631 attempted to succeed Paul Auget as superintendent of the music of the king's chamber.

== Biography ==
The first mention of Jean Boyer is when he intervened regarding his cousin Jehan Bernard (c. 1631 – after 1711), who resigned his duties as cantor of the King's Chamber and Chapel in Jean's favor. The act specifies that Jean Boyer was son of the late Philibert Boyer, prosecutor in the court of Parliament, and that he was "experienced in the art of music, even on the lute and on the viols".

It was not until February 1617 that he appeared in ballet de cour, composing that year an aria for an unidentified ballet and another for the Ballet des Forgerons. He contributed to other ballets: in 1618 an air for the "Ballet de la Folie" and another for the "Ballet de M. de Nemours", in 1621 an air for an unidentified ballet and another for the "Ballet des Indiens", finally in 1626 for the Ballet du Grand bal de la Douairière de Billebahaut.

The dedication of his books of arias published in 1619 and 1621 shows that he probably worked for Henri I, Duke of Nemours (1572–1632), who was the usual ordonnator of the king's ballets, and who might have introduced him to the court in a more active manner than his cantor's office permitted him.

On 13 December 1629, he was appointed Ordinary Secretary of the King's Chamber and on 18 February 1636, he obtained half of the ordinary viol player charge from the King's House held by Gabriel Caignet the old, by resignation of the latter. This charge brought him 450 lt for a semester. He also became ordinary member of the music of queen Anne of Austria, with 1200 lt of yearly wages.

Henry of Savoy-Nemours having died in the meantime, Boyer seems to have attached himself to the house of Gaston d’Orléans, brother of the king. The two books of songs that he published in 1636 and 1642 reveal ties in his environment.

On 7 January 1640, Jean Boyer bought a house in Wissous, south of Paris. He married Jeanne Aymar (widow of Jacques de Mézières) in February 1644. He had a sister, Marguerite, married to François Gaulthier, prosecutor in Parliament, a brother Léon, equerry, councilor of the king and inspector of the wars, and a uterine sister Suzanne Maugars, wife of Jean Bigot, a lawyer in parliament. Perhaps the latter was of the family of André Maugars (c. 1580 – c. 1645), a famous violist.

He died in May 1648, when he was still an ordinary of the Music of the king and the queen. His inventory after death (16 May 1648) was found. At that time he lived in the rue des Marmousets. This inventory reveals two theorbos, a lute, two viols, two guitars, recorders and at Wissous still a theorbo, a viol, an oboe and a musette.

At the time of his marriage, his music books included secular and spiritual works by Claude Le Jeune, lute tablatures, tunes and songs, secular songs by Roland de Lassus or their spiritual parodies, and Italian madrigals. The substantial proportion of spiritual contrafacta may suggest that he was a Protestant.

In 2019 lutenist Floris Derycker and his ensemble Ratas del Viejo Mundo dedicated an entire CD to the "Chansons à boire" and "Airs de cour" of Jean Boyer.

== Works ==
=== Court arias ===
Boyer published several books of polyphonic tunes (for four voices or for voice and lute) published under his name or in collective collections. He showed a beautiful inventiveness and a real sensitivity to the expressiveness of the texts he put into music.

- Airs de différents auteurs, mis en tablature de luth par eux-mêmes. Huitième livre. Paris : Pierre I Ballard, 1618. 1 vol. 4°. RISM 1618 exp 9 and S 3419, Guillo 2003 n° 1618-A.

Includes 8 arias by Boyer, among other arias by Pierre Guédron, Antoine Boësset, Paul Auget, Vincent, Grand-Rue, Nicolas Signac, Savorny and Claude Coffin.

- Airs à 4 parties, par Jean Boyer parisien. [Premier livre]. Paris : Pierre I Ballard, 1619. 4 vol. 8° obl. RISM B 4181, Guillo 2003 n° 1619-B.

Dedication to Prince Henri I, Duke of Nemours, Duke of Genevois and Nemours, with various introductory pieces to the praise of Boyer, one of Boyer himself, and one on his anagram "J’é bon air". Edition with an introduction by Thomas Leconte: Versailles : CMBV, 2003 (Cahiers de musique, E01).
Contains 37 arias, including one from the Ballet de M. de Nemours (1619), one from the Ballet de la Folie (1618), one from the Ballet des Forgerons (1617), and three spiritual pieces grouped together at the end.

- Airs de Jean Boyer parisien, mis en tablature de luth par lui-même. Paris : Pierre I Ballard, 1621. 1 vol. 4°. RISM B 4182, Guillo 2003 n° 1621-D.

Dedication to Madame Anne de Lorraine, Duchesse of Genevois and Nemours, with stanzas on the arias of M. Boyer by "D. I."
Contains 27 pieces for voice and lute, one from an unidentified ballet, another from the Ballet de Monsieur de Nemours (1619) and three spiritual pieces grouped together at the end. This collection offers many concordances with his tunes for one voice.

- IIe livre d'airs à 4 parties de Jean Boyer. Paris : Pierre I Ballard, 1627. 4 vol. 8° obl. Manque au RISM, Guillo 2003 n° 1627-A.

Dedication to Monsieur L'Archer, President in the Chamber of Accounts, with a quatrain signed "I. D. M." and an octave signed by Ch. Morin.
Contains 36 pieces, including some drinking songs grouped at the end. Only the taille part is known, but the other voices of about fifteen can be reconstructed with the contrafacta which have been published in the Philomèle séraphique (Tournai: Adrien Quinqué, 1632 and 1640).

Moreover, between 1618 and 1628, his tunes are inserted in collections of air for one voice:

- IIIe livre d'airs de cour, et de différents auteurs [1 v.]. Paris : Pierre I Ballard, 1619. 1 vol. 8°. RISM 1619 exp 10, Guillo 2003 n° 1619-A.

Contains nine tunes from Boyer, among arias from Pierre Guédron, Antoine Boësset, Gabriel Bataille, Vincent, Grand-Rue, Nicolas Signac, Savorny, Claude Coffin, and Paul Auget.

- Airs de différents auteurs [1 v.]. Paris : Pierre I Ballard, 1621. 1 vol. 8°. RISM 1621 exp 13, Guillo 2003 1621-B.

Contains eight tunes from Boyer including a ballet tale, among court or drinking tunes by Claude Coffin, Grand-Rue and Sauvage.

- Ve livre d'airs de cour et de différents auteurs [1 v.]. Paris : Pierre I Ballard, 1623/1624. 1 vol. 8°. RISM 1623 exp 5, Guillo 2003 n° 1623-B.

Contains between four and ten arias of Boyer, among other arias by Antoine Boësset and Grand-Rue.

- VIIe livre d'airs de cour, et de différents auteurs [1 v.]. Paris : Pierre I Ballard, 1626. 1 vol. 8°. RISM 1626 exp 11, Guillo 2003 n° 1626-B. Édition réimprimée en 1628 (RISM 1628 exp 8, Guillo 2003 n° 1628-B).

Contains two tunes by Boyer, among French or Spanish tunes by Étienne Moulinié, Antoine Boësset, François Richard, Bocan, Guillaume Barberon, Gabriel Bataille or Jacques Lefèvre. In the 1628 reissue, the tunes of Boyer became anonymous.

- VIIIe livre d'airs de cour, et de différents auteurs [1 v.]. Paris : Pierre I Ballard, 1628. 1 vol. 8°. RISM 1628 exp 9, Guillo 2003 n° 1628-C.

Contains 27 arias by Boyer, among court or drinking tunes by Antoine Boësset, Paul Auget and François Richard.

=== Chansons ===
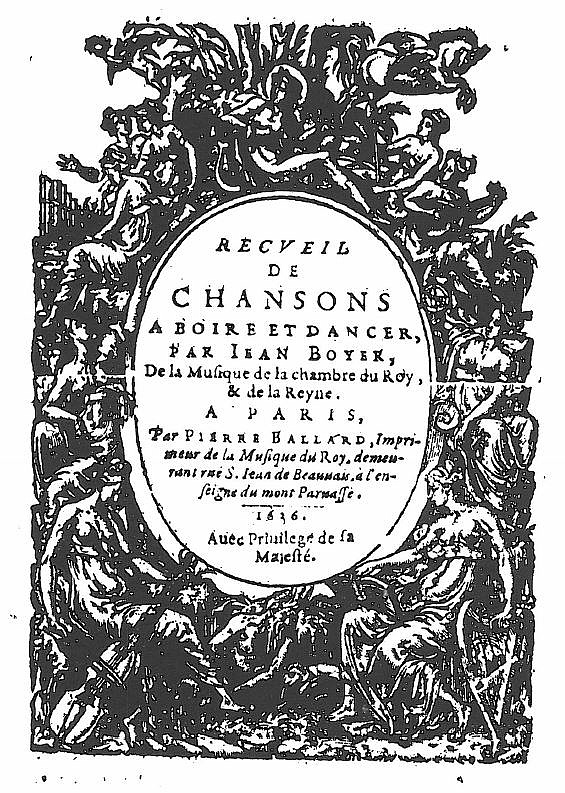
The Chansons of 1636.

The songs published by Boyer are later and less elaborate than his tunes:

- Recueil de chansons à boire et danser par Jean Boyer, de la Musique de la chambre du Roy, & de la Reyne [1-2 v., Ier livre]. Paris : Pierre I Ballard, 1636. 1 vol. 8°. RISM B 4183, Guillo 2003 n° 1636-D.

Dedication to Monsieur de Flotte, ordinary gentleman of the house of Gaston, Duke of Orléans, with some introductory pieces.
Contains 26 drinking songs for two voices including three for Gaston d'Orléans, and 25 dancing songs for one voice.

- IIe livre des chansons à danser et à boire de Jean Boyer, de la Musique de la chambre du Roy [1-2 v.]. Paris, Robert III Ballard, 1642. 1 vol. 8°. RISM B 4184, Guillo 2003 n° 1642-B. This edition was collected in 1644 by Robert III Ballard (Guillo 2003 n° 1644-E) and in 1699 by Christophe Ballard (Guillo 2003 n° 1699-F).

Contains 31 songs for dancing, four courantes for dancing, two sarabandes, all with one voice, and seven songs for dancing for two voices.

== Bibliography ==
- Christelle Cazaux, La musique à la cour de François Ier. Paris : École des Chartes; Tours : Programme Ricercar, 2002.
- Marie-Thérèse Bouquet, Quelques relations musicales franco-piémontaises aux XVIIe et au XVIIIe siècles, in 'Recherches sur la musique française classique" 10 (1970), p. 5-18.
- Georgie Durosoir, L’Air de cour en France, 1571-1655. Liège : Mardaga, 1991.
- Laurent Guillo : Pierre I Ballard et Robert III Ballard : imprimeurs du roy pour la musique (1599–1673). Liège : Mardaga et Versailles : CMBV, 2003. 2 vol. ISBN 2-87009-810-3.
- Madeleine Jurgens, Documents du minutier central concernant l’histoire de la musique, 1600–1650. 1 : Études I-X. Paris : Archives nationales, 1967.
- Madeleine Jurgens, Documents du minutier central concernant l’histoire de la musique, 1600–1650. 2 : Études XI-XX. Paris : Archives nationales, 1974.
- Catherine Massip, La vie des musiciens de Paris au temps de Mazarin (1643-1661) : essai d'étude sociale. Paris : Picard, 1976.
