= Didier Le Blanc =

French music editor and composer (fl. 1578–1584)

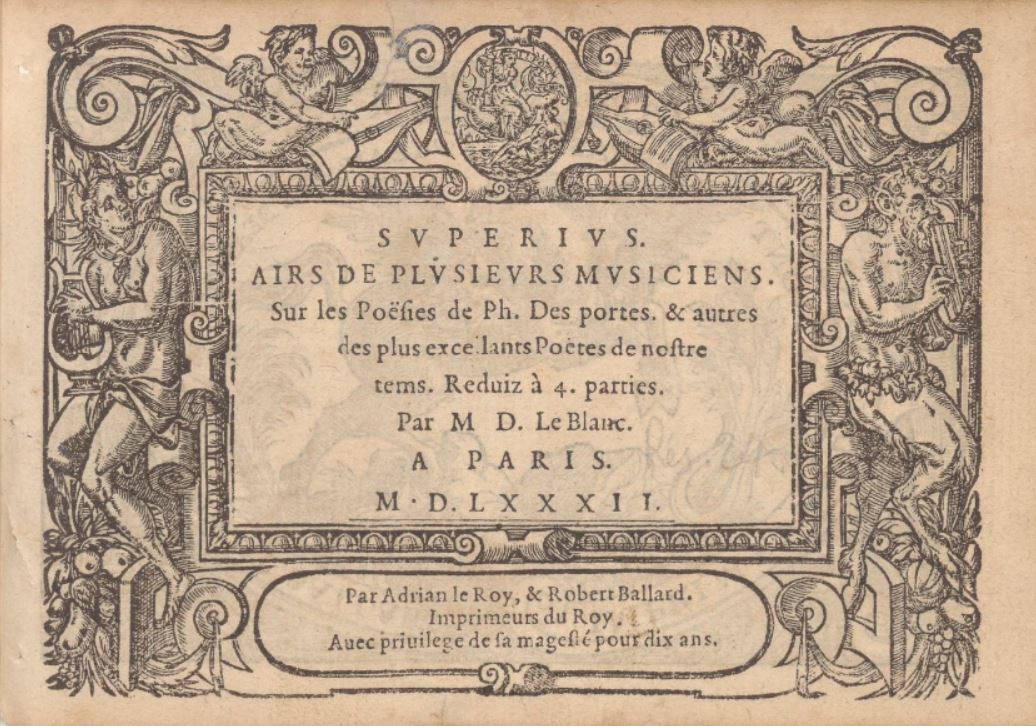
Airs de plusieurs musiciens, 1582

Didier Le Blanc (fl. 1578–84) was a French Renaissance music editor and composer chiefly known for vocal music. He was likely active in Paris, but little is known about his life. Musicologist Henry Expert called him an "initiateur et ... Maître" (pioneer and master) of the air de cour.

== Publications ==
In 1578, for the second edition of Le Roy & Ballards' first collection of bicinia, Le Blanc supplied eight contrapuntal duets derived from musical material found in four- and five-part chansons by Orlando di Lasso. This collection has subsequently received a modern edition. He also contributed a three-part arrangement of Adriaen Willaert's six-voice chanson "A la fontaine". This arrangement appeared in Le Roy and Ballard's second collection of three-part chansons, also published in 1578.

In 1579, Le Blanc published Airs de plusieurs musicien, sur les poésies de Ph. Desportes et autres des plus excelants postes de nostre tems reduiz a 4. parties par M. Di. Le Blanc (Airs by various musicians, set to the poetry of Philippe Desportes ...), a collection of 42 airs dedicated to lutenist and music printer Adrian Le Roy in a sonnet written by Le Blanc. In 1582, it received a second edition. (This collection was later edited in Henry Expert's Monuments de la musique française au temps de la Renaissance.)

A further collection, Second livre d'airs des plus excelants musiciens de nostre tems reduiz a 4, parties par M.D. Le Blanc (Second book of airs by the most excellent musicians ...), appeared the same year, with 42 more airs and a shorter dedicatory poem for Pierre Dugué, a portmanteau used to signify royal musicians tied to Francis, Duke of Anjou, and Ballard's wife, Lucréce Dugué. (A modern edition appeared in the Sources de la chanson française series.)

These volumes consist of four- and five-part settings or arrangements of melodies associated with various composers. The texts are primarily strophic poems by contemporary French poets, especially the lyric poetry of La Pléiade. Among the writers identified in the first collection, besides Le Blanc and Desportes, are Jean-Antoine de Baïf, Pierre de Ronsard, Rémy Belleau, and Joachim du Bellay. Some melodies in Le Blanc's collections correspond to tunes that had appeared in four-part settings of the same poems by Fabrice Caietain and Girard de Beaulieu.

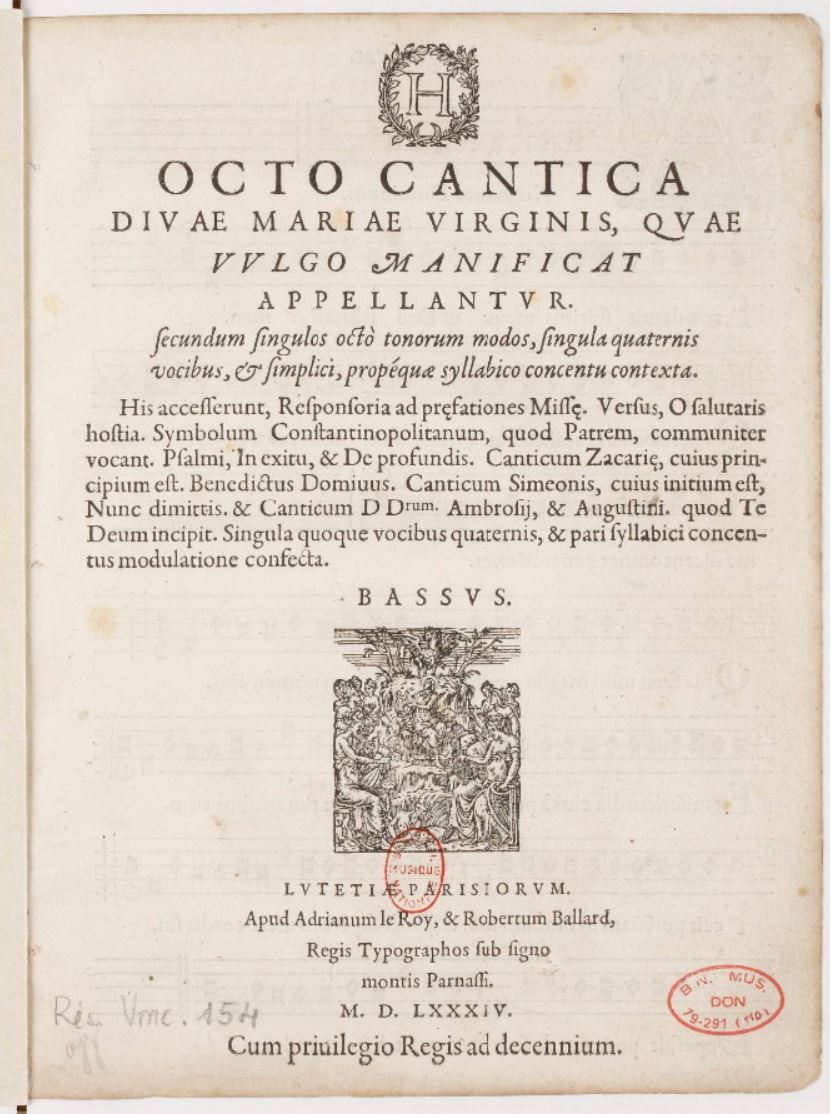
Octo Cantica, 1584

Only one work is identified in the source (Le Roy and Ballard's Octo Cantica, an anthology of Magnificat settings printed in 1584) as an original composition by Le Blanc: a four-part, homophonic setting of the Te Deum.

== Style ==
Le Blanc's airs are mostly homophonic. Their musical organization is closely connected to the structure and meter of the poetry, earning the praise of Henry Expert. Both duple and triple meters are employed, sometimes in alternation, while the musical phrasing generally follows the natural accentuation and organization of the French texts. Unlike the rigorously quantitative approach associated with musique mesurée à l'antique, Le Blanc's writing does not attempt to reproduce classical quantitative poetic meters systematically.

A small number of works feature unusual cadences involving an anticipation, in which a note of the final harmony sounds before the concluding chord.

== See also ==
- Jehan Chardavoine
- Villanella
- Voix de ville
