= Jacques de Belleville =

Jacques de Montmorency, sieur de Belleville (died c. 1640) was a 17th-century French violinist, lutenist, ballet master and composer.

He was one of Louis XIII's dance masters with Nicolas Dugap, Jacques Cordier and Pierre Beauchamp.

On 27 May 1637 he married Antoinette Guibourg, the widow of painter and theater costume designer Daniel Rabel.

== Works ==
He is best known for the great ballets of which he wrote the music and organized the choreography to the court of Louis XIII between 1615 and 1632, including:

- 1615: Ballet des petits Mores
- 1617: Ballet de la délivrance de Renaud, the sung airs are by Pierre Guédron
- 1619: Ballet de Tancrède
- 1620: Ballet de Psyché
- 1625: Ballet des Fées de la Forêt de Saint-Germain, the sung airs are by Antoine Boësset
- 1632: Ballet du château de Bicêtre

There are also orchestral suites and arrangements for lute tablature published in the compendium Airs de différents auteurs mis en tablature sur des accords nouveaux, Paris, 1631.
