= Jean-Baptiste Boësset =

French composer (1614–1685)

Jean-Baptiste Boësset (1614 – 25 December 1685) was a French composer of sacred and secular music, whose notable works include an Ave Regina caelorum and several airs de cour. He was the eldest son of the court composer Antoine Boësset.

== Works ==
His most well-known works are an Ave Regina caelorum, several airs de cour, five motets and some psaumes.

Three masses previously ascribed to his father are now widely ascribed to him, whilst he also worked with Jean Baptiste Lully on ballets de cour from 1653 to 1666.
