= Jean Boyer =

Jean Boyer may refer to:

- Jean Boyer (director) (1901–1965), French film director and songwriter
- Jean Boyer (footballer) (1901–1981), French footballer
- Jean Boyer (politician) (1937–2025), French politician
- Jean Boyer (composer) (died 1648), French viol player and composer
- Jean Boyer (organist) (1948–2004), French organist and professor
