= Gabriel Bataille =

- Born: Between June 1574 and June 1575; Probably in Brie, France
- Died: 17 December 1630; Paris
- Occupations: Lutenist; Baroque composer

Gabriel Bataille (between June 1574 and June 1575 – 17 December 1630) was a French musician, lutenist and composer of airs de cour.

== Biography ==
The allusions to Brie in his verse pieces suggest that Gabriel Bataille was a native of this province. He had a brother Louis, a tailor, quoted in an act of 1621 and a sister Catherine, married to Didier Dutour, usher of the accounts and treasures in Paris, and died before 1600.

At the time of his marriage with Catherine Carre, on 12 February 1600, he was already a Parisian, but his marriage contract specified that he was then clerk to the parliamentary counselor Germain Regnault; thus he was not yet a professional musician. When in 1608 Pierre I Ballard published the first volumes of his Airs de différents autheurs, he had probably become one: from 1614 he was listed as master of music.

From 1617 to his death, he was master of music of the house of Anne of Austria (1601–1666), by semester, alternating with Antoine Boësset. He had signed a contract with the latter, which also aimed at this post, so that the one who would obtain it would share it with the other (what happened). He had to testify on 9 June 1617 at the trial of Leonora Galigai, and described the exorbitant conditions imposed by the Marshal d'Ancre on the musicians who had applied for the charges of musician of the house of the queen (an entire year of wages).

Bataille inserted a piece of verse to the praise of Jacques Le Fèvre in his Meslanges dated 1613; by will, the latter left him on 22 December 1627, a part of the books of music which collected all his works. In 1617 and 1618, Bataille also published pieces of verses at the beginning of books by Antoine Boësset and Pierre Guédron. It is thus necessary to see these three musicians at the center of his network of friends.

On 5 February 1614, he was a witness at the marriage of Jean Rocher, Sieur de Bréau, agent at the Finance Council. His friendship with Pierre I Ballard, which favored his career, shows in his sponsorship of Marguerite, daughter of the printer and Sansonne Coulon, dated 11 February 1619. On 22 January 1624, Gabriel Bataille was again witness of the marriage of Nicolas Chastelet (like him a musician of the queen) with Marie Sodey then on 5 February of the same year, witness of the bride at the marriage of Thomas Vassetz, notary note-keeper at the Grand Châtelet, with Marie Carré, probably a sister of his wife.

He had four living children: Pierre, ordinary musician of queens' music, Madeleine, Gabriel II, who succeeded him as master of the Queen's music (which suggests that he had obtained this charge in "survival" from his father), and Françoise.

His wife Catherine Carré was buried on 8 February 1624; while he died on 17 December 1630 and was buried in the église Saint-Paul the day after. He lived at rue Geoffroy-l'Asnier (at least since 1611). The inventory of his possessions, drawn up on 14 February 1631, revealed five lutes, 29 packages of music and an interesting library.

== Works ==
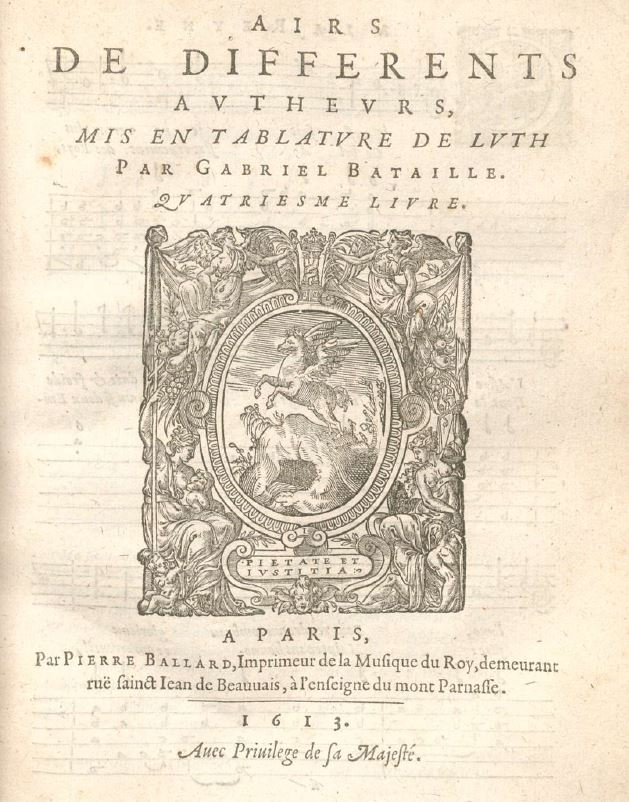
Title page of the IVe livre d'airs mis en tabulature de luth (1613).

=== Court arias set to lute ===
The most active period of the production of Bataille was between 1605 and 1620; After that date, and until his death, we have very little information about his life. In 1608 and 1615 he published a collection of court arias composed by the most prominent masters of the moment and arranged by him for voice and lute. It includes six books, some of which have been reissued, a sign of real success. Here is the list:

- Airs de différents auteurs mis au luth par G. Bataille, Ier livre, RISM 1608(10), Guillo 2003 n° 1608-A.
- Airs de différents auteurs mis au luth par G. Bataille, Ier livre, rééd., RISM 1612(7), Guillo 2003 n° 1612-A.
- Airs de différents auteurs mis au luth par G. Bataille, IIe livre, RISM 1609(13), Guillo 2003 n° 1609-A.
- Airs de différents auteurs mis au luth par G. Bataille IIe livre, rééd., RISM 1614(8), Guillo 2003 n° 1614-A.
- Airs de différents auteurs mis au luth par G. Bataille IIIe livre, RISM 1611(10), Guillo 2003 n° 1611-A.
- Airs de différents auteurs mis au luth par G. Bataille IIIe livre, rééd., RISM 1614(9), Guillo 2003 n° 1614-B.
- Airs de différents auteurs mis au luth par G. Bataille, Ie livre, RISM 1613(9), Guillo 2003 n° 1613-A.
- Airs de différents auteurs mis au luth par G. Bataille, Ve livre, RISM 1614(10), Guillo 2003 n° 1614-C.
- Airs de différents auteurs mis au luth par G. Bataille VIe livre, RISM 1615(11), Guillo 2003 n° 1615-A

The ensemble was republished in facsimile by Minkoff in Geneva; In addition, a selection of pieces was published twice: French ayres from Gabriel Bataille's Airs de différents autheurs (1608-1618), ed. Peter Warlock (London : Oxford University Press, ca.1926);Nine pieces appear in Airs de cour pour voix et luth (1607–43), éd. A. Verchaly (Paris: Société Française de Musicologie, 1961).

They contain mostly airs de cour, autonomous or excerpts of ballets represented at the time to the court of France. There are also nine psalms translated into verses measured by Philippe Desportes.

In these courtly tunes, Bataille took a lot of the works of Pierre Guédron. He of course included in his collections several of his own compositions. He showed himself respectful of the original vocal melody, by decorating it appreciably. At the lute, he respected the original bass part, but more easily adapted the intermediate voices.

Many of the pieces in these collections have been included in collections of contemporary spiritual arias, such as La Pieuse Alouette of printer Jean Vervliet (Valenciennes, 1619–1621), which is a sign of a fairly wide spread.

=== Arias of his own ===
Gabriel Bataille also composed his own tunes.

- 16 tunes for four voices, grouped at the beginning of Airs à quatre de différents auteurs, et mis ensemble par Pierre Ballard (Paris: Pierre I Ballard, 1613, RISM 1613(8), Guillo 2003 No 1613-B).
- 34 tunes for one voice published in 1615 and 1626, of which 21 appear in the Airs de cour et de différents auteurs [1st Book] (Paris : Pierre I Ballard, 1615, RISM 1615(12), Guillo 2003 n° 1615-B.
- 43 tunes for voice and lute are contained, under his name, in the collections published between 1608 and 1615 mentioned above, put to the lute by himself. Among these tunes are 10 psalms on Desportes verses, which Verchaly all attributes to Bataille, while only the last (in the 1615-A collection) is published under his name.
- 9 other tunes for voice and lute, published between 1617 and 1620, in the following collections:
  - Airs de différents auteurs, mis en tablature de luth par eux-mêmes, (7th Book) (Paris: Pierre I Ballard, 1617, RISM 1617{(8), Guillo 2003 n° 1617-A).
  - Idem, (8th Book) (idem, 1618, RISM {(9), 1618-A).
  - Airs de différents auteurs, mis en tablature de luth par eux-mêmes, (9th Book) (idem, 1620, RISM 1620(11), Guillo 2003 n° 1620-A).

In these last collections, some tunes come from contemporary court ballets: Ballet du roi (c. 1616), Ballet de La délivrance de Renaud (1617), Ballet de Monseigneur le Prince (1620).

== Bibliography ==
- Laurent Guillo, Pierre I Ballard et Robert III Ballard : imprimeurs du roy pour la musique (1599–1673). Liège : Mardaga et Versailles : CMBV, 2003. 2 vol.
- Georgie Durosoir. L'Air de cour en France, 1571-1655. Liège : Mardaga, 1991.
- David Tunley, Ballard’s Publications Airs de differents autheurs (1608–1632) : some reflections, Miscellanea Musicologica (University of Adélaïde) 15 (1988), p. 100–113.
- Margaret McGowan, L’art du ballet de cour en France, 1581-1643. Paris : Éditions du CNRS, 1978.
- Musiciens de Paris 1535–1792 after the Laborde file. Published by Yolande de Brossard. Paris: Picard, 1965.
- Madeleine Jurgens, Documents du minutier central concernant l’histoire de la musique, 1600–1650. Paris: 1967, 1974.
- Michel Le Moël. Recherches sur la musique du roi et plusieurs de ses grands officiers de 1600 à 1660. Thèse de l'École des Chartes, 1954.
- André Verchaly, Gabriel Bataille et son œuvre personnelle pour chant et luth, Revue de musicologie 26 (1947), p. 1–24 and 72–88.
- Fernand Hayem, Le Maréchal d'Ancre et Léonora Galigaï. Notice biographique par M. Abel Lefranc. Paris : Plon, Nourrit et Cie, 1910.
- Jules Écorcheville, Actes d'état civil de musiciens insinués au Châtelet de Paris. Paris : L. M. Fortin, 1907.
- Jal, Auguste. Dictionnaire critique de biographie et d’histoire, vol. 1 (A-K). Paris : 1967.
