= Fabrice Caietain =

Italian singer, songwriter and song publisher

Fabrice-Marin Caietain or Fabrice Cajetan (fl. 1570-1578) was an Italian singer, songwriter and song publisher.

== Life and career ==
Fabrice Cajetan was born in Gaeta, Italy, and lived in France during the latter Sixteenth century. He was employed as Master of Singers at the Toul Cathedral for the Dukes of Lorraine, succeeding Pierre Clereau. In 1571 in Paris, he began publishing collections of songs set to music, including Livre de chansons nouvelles mises en musique à six parties and Liber primus.

In one preface, Caietain stated that he was especially influenced by Joachim Thibault de Courville and the Académie de Poésie et de Musique. Although de Courville published none of his own music, it is presumed that some of the chansons published by Caietain contained passages or were stylistic copies of de Courville's work. Caietain also published the works of La Pléiade, including Pierre de Ronsard, Jean-Antoine de Baif and Joachim Du Bellay, and also Jean Bertaut, Philippe Desportes and Amadis Jamyn.
