= French Academy (disambiguation) =

The French Academy, or Académie Française, is the pre-eminent French learned body on matters pertaining to the French language.

French Academy may also refer to:

- French Academy in Rome, an art school in Italy
- French Academy of Sciences, a scientific society
- French Academy of Technologies, a learned society with an emphasis on technology

== See also ==
- Académie des Inscriptions et Belles-Lettres
- French academies
