= Tempo giusto =

An example of a piece in tempo giusto

Tempo giusto (Italian pronunciation: [ˈtɛmpo ˈdʒusto]) is a musical term that means 'in correct time'.

== General ==
In the 17th and 18th centuries (Baroque and early Classical), tempo giusto referred to the idea that each meter has its own 'ideal' tempo; this was also referred to as tempo ordinario (ordinary time). The larger the beat value of the meter, the slower the tempo. Therefore, meters with beat values of a minim/half note (e.g. 2/2, 3/2) should be performed with a slow tempo; those with quaver/eighth note beats (e.g. 3/8) are fast; while those with crotchet/quarter note beats (e.g. 2/4, 3/4, 4/4) are performed at a moderate or middling tempo. This convention started in Italy in the 1600s (seicento), and continued in Germany in the 1700s, as theorized by Friedrich Wilhelm Marpurg (1755) and Johann Kirnberger (1776; see sequel):

Regarding meter types, those having larger beats [values], like allabreve, 3/2, and 6/4 meter, have a heavier and slower movement [tempo] than those with smaller beats [values] like 2/4, 3/4, and 6/8 meter, and these in turn are less lively than 3/8 or 6/16 meter.

Conventions existed for what the "correct" tempo for a particular style was, notably detailed for French dances in Michel L'Affilard (1691–1717).

The composer and music theorist Johann Kirnberger (1776) formalized and refined this idea by instructing the performer to consider the following details in combination when determining the best performance tempo of a piece: the tempo giusto of the meter, the tempo term (Allegro, Adagio, etc., if there is one, at the start of the piece), the particular rhythms in the piece (taking account of the longest and shortest notes), the 'character' of the piece, and the piece's genre (whether it was a minuet, sarabande, gigue, etc.). In this way, an experienced musician could rely on his/her (informed) intuition to find the 'right' tempo. Occasionally, a composer will mark a piece tempo giusto to request the performer to use his/her experience in this way: that is, to intuit the correct tempo from the structure and nature of the piece itself.

From the mid-18th century, the notion of each meter having an 'ideal tempo' fell out of fashion, as composers started preferring to indicate tempo with tempo terms and (later, in the nineteenth century) with metronome markings.

The artistic director of the Madison Symphony Orchestra, Maestro John DeMain, has said, “[n]ow that I think about it, the idea of tempo giusto describes just about everything I do or aspire to."

== See also ==
- Glossary of musical terminology
- Tempo
