= Gabriel II Bataille =

Gabriel II Bataille was the master of music of French Queen Anne of Austria (1601–1666) from 1630 to 1666.

== Biography ==
Third surviving child of the family, after his brother Pierre and his sister Madeleine, Gabriel II Bataille succeeded his father Gabriel Bataille as master of the Queen's music in 1630, who probably named his son in survival. He is cited in this office in an act of 1633, in another act dated 1635, and again in 1636. Two roles of the Queen's music mention him precisely: the first in 1641, which specifies his wages of 900 lt per year and that he works in the second half of the year (the first being devolved to Antoine Boësset and the second in 1666 just after the death of the queen: he was at the same wages, but worked the first Semester, the second belonging to Robert Cambert.

He married Marie Brunet, who gave him a daughter Marguerite baptized on 27 January 1629 in the parish of Saint-Leu, but buried on 18 February. On 5 January 1639 Gabriel II became the godfather of Gabriel Morot, the daughter of musician Mathieu Lalemant (husband of his sister Madeleine Bataille), then on 24 April 1645 of Gabriel Piquet and on 27 August 1664 of Robert Gabriel du Garnier.

He died after 1666.

While his father published much, there is no source of possible works by Gabriel II.

== Sources ==
- Catherine Massip: La Vie des musiciens de Paris au temps de Mazarin (1643-1661): essai d'étude sociale. Paris: Picard, 1976.
- Musiciens de Paris 1535–1792 after the Laborde file. Published by Yolande de Brossard. Paris: Picard, 1965.
- Madeleine Jurgens, Documents du minutier central concernant l’histoire de la musique, 1600–1650. Paris: 1967, 1974.
