= Eustache Du Caurroy =

French composer (1549–1609)

François-Eustache du Caurroy (baptised February 4, 1549 – August 7, 1609) was a French composer of the late Renaissance. He was a prominent composer of both secular and sacred music at the end of the Renaissance, including musique mesurée, and he was also influential on the foundation of the French school of organ music as exemplified in the work of Jean Titelouze.

== Life ==
According to Jean-Benjamin de La Borde, writing in 1780, Du Caurroy was born in Gerberoy and was baptised in Beauvais. He probably entered royal service around 1569, and in 1575 is first mentioned in documents from the royal court, when he won a song competition: he was to win two more, in 1576 and 1583, for a motet and a chanson respectively. He became sous-maître de la chapelle royale, a post which he held until 1595, at which time he was appointed to be official composer of the royal chamber; in 1599 he also acquired the post of composer at the royal chapel.

Du Caurroy accumulated wealth and honours in the first decade of the 17th century, including benefices and a large estate in Picardy. In his late years he also held the post of canon at several churches, including Sainte-Croix in Orléans, Sainte-Chapelle in Dijon, as well as others in Passy and Saint-Cyr-en-Bourg.

== Music and influence ==
Du Caurroy was a late practitioner of the style of musique mesurée, the musical method of setting French verse (vers mesurés) in long and short syllables, to long and short note values, in a homophonic texture, as pioneered by Claude Le Jeune under the influence of Jean-Antoine de Baïf and his Académie de musique et de poésie. Many of Du Caurroy's chansons written in this style were not published until 1609, long after the disbanding of the Académie, and they contrast significantly with his otherwise more conservative musical output. According to Du Caurroy, he was initially hostile to writing in the style, but was so moved by a performance of a composition of Le Jeune's, a pseaume mesuré sung by a hundred voices, that he wanted to attempt it himself.

Du Caurroy was primarily interested in counterpoint, and was widely read in the theoretical work of the time, including that of Gioseffo Zarlino, who provided the best available summation of the contrapuntal practice in the 16th century. His contrapuntal interest is best shown in his sacred music, of which the largest collection is the two volumes of motets, 53 in all, entitled Preces ecclesiasticae, published in Paris in 1609. They are from 3 to 7 voices.

His Missa pro defunctis, first performed at the funeral of Henry IV of France, was the requiem mass which was played at St. Denis for the funerals of French kings for the next several centuries. It is a long composition containing the Libera me responsory, the chant for which is similar to the famous Dies irae.

Du Caurroy also used the musique mesurée technique in his sacred compositions, including seven psalm settings, published in his Meslanges (Paris, posthumously, 1610): one is in Latin, one of the few examples of a musique mesurée setting in a language other than French.

Marin Mersenne's Harmonie universelle contains a setting by Du Caurroy of Pie Jesu, which is a canon for six voices. In this same book, Mersenne held that Du Caurroy was the finest composer of musique mesurée, outranking even the renowned Claude Le Jeune.

Du Caurroy also wrote instrumental music, including contrapuntal fantasies for three to six instruments. The collection of 42 such pieces, published posthumously in 1610, is considered to be a strong influence on the next generation of French keyboard players, especially Jean Titelouze, the founder of the French organ school.

== References and further reading ==
- M.-A. Colin (éd.), Eustache du Caurroy. Preces ecclesiasticae, Brepols Publishers, 1999, ISBN 978-2-252-03280-0
- M.-A. Colin (éd.), Eustache du Caurroy, Missa pro Defunctis, Brepols Publishers, 2003, ISBN 978-2-503-51492-5
- Paul-André Gaillard, Richard Freedman, Marie-Alexis Colin: "Eustache du Caurroy", Grove Music Online, ed. L. Macy (Accessed July 5, 2006), (subscription access)
- Gustave Reese, Music in the Renaissance. New York, W.W. Norton & Co., 1954. ISBN 0-393-09530-4
