= Jacques Mauduit =

French composer

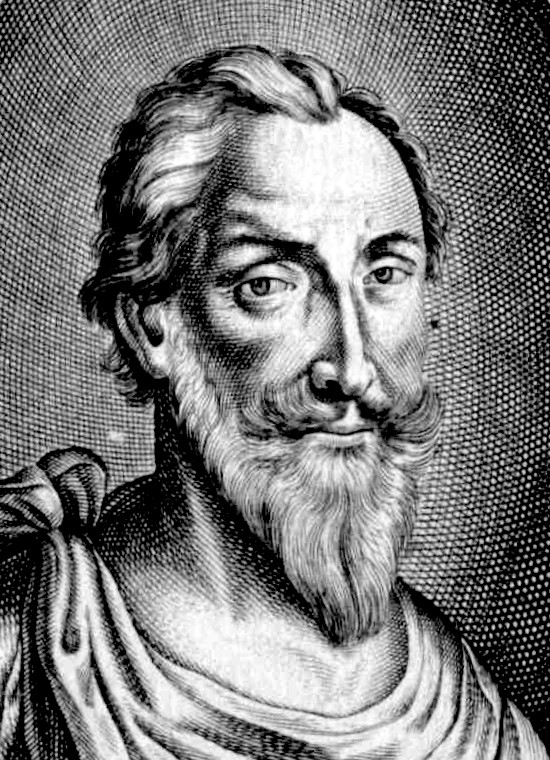
Engraving of Mauduit by Jean Matheus, 1633

Jacques Mauduit (16 September 1557 – 21 August 1627) was a French composer of the late Renaissance. He was one of the most innovative French composers of the late 16th century, combining voices and instruments in new ways while importing some of the grand polychoral style of the Venetian School from Italy. He also composed a famous Requiem for the funeral of Pierre de Ronsard.

== Life ==
Much of the biographical information about Mauduit comes from the writings of Marin Mersenne. Mauduit was born in Paris, and being an aristocrat, received an excellent education in humanities, languages and philosophy, but was evidently self-taught in music. Mauduit was a member of the Académie de Poésie et de Musique, the secretive group founded by Jean Antoine de Baïf to promote musique mesurée à l'antique, an attempt to recreate the rhetorical and ethical effect of ancient Greek music using modern French poetry and music. After the death of Joachim Thibault de Courville in 1581, Mauduit became the principal musician of the Académie.

Evidently Mauduit was a man of some personal courage, for during the siege of Paris in 1589–1590, in the closing phase of the bloody French Wars of Religion, he assisted Claude Le Jeune in escaping from the city (had he been caught, both would have been executed), and he also helped save much of Le Jeune's music as well as the unpublished work of Baïf. He outlived all of the other composers of the Académie, dying in Paris in 1627.

== Music and influence ==
Mauduit was a prolific composer of chansons in the relatively recent style of musique mesurée, in which the rhythmic values assigned to notes exactly matched the stresses of the French words, typically in a 2:1 ratio of stressed to unstressed. While he never achieved the fame of Claude Le Jeune, this may have been in part due to Mersenne's failure to publish his complete works, a project which he promised but never completed. Mauduit's style was simple and clear, setting texts without alteration, and achieving variety using mostly harmonic means.

While his five-voice Requiem mass for Pierre de Ronsard dates from 1585, Mauduit's first publication was a collection of Chansonnettes mesurées de Jean-Antoine de Baïf, for four voices (1586). This collection was the first publication consisting exclusively of musique mesurée. Much of his music from the late 16th century is presumed to be lost.

He was also a composer of airs de cour for solo voice and lute, as well as a ballet La déliverance de Renaud for 92 singers and 45 instrumentalists, which was performed in 1617.

Among lost works mentioned by Mersenne are over 300 psalm settings, Vespers, Tenebrae settings, 104 hymns, masses and motets; indeed Mauduit may have suffered one of the highest percentages of lost music of any major composer of the late Renaissance.

Mauduit continued to use the technique of musique mesurée into the 17th century, and in contexts for which it was not originally intended, such as large settings for groups of voices and instruments, some of which may have been in the Venetian style. Mersenne also credited Mauduit with introducing the viol consort into France; he also claimed that it was Mauduit who suggested adding the sixth string to the viol.

== References and further reading ==
- Frank Dobbins: "Jacques Mauduit," in The New Grove Dictionary of Music and Musicians, ed. Stanley Sadie. 20 vol. London, Macmillan Publishers Ltd., 1980. ISBN 1-56159-174-2
- Gustave Reese, Music in the Renaissance. New York, W.W. Norton & Co., 1954. ISBN 0-393-09530-4
- Jeanice Brooks, Courtly Song in Late Sixteenth-Century France. Chicago, The University of Chicago Press, 2000. ISBN 0-226-07587-7
