= Académie de Poésie et de Musique =

The Académie de Poésie et de Musique (French: Académie de poésie et de musique), later renamed the Académie du Palais, was the first Academy in France. It was founded in 1570 under the auspices of Charles IX of France by the poet Jean-Antoine de Baïf and the musician Joachim Thibault de Courville.

== Overview ==
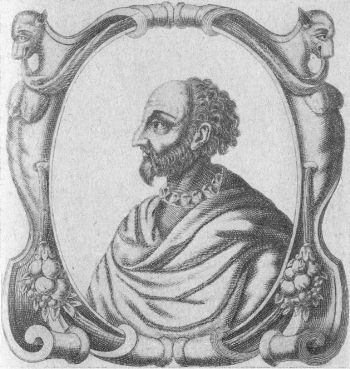
Jean-Antoine de Baïf

The purpose of the Académie was to revive Classical Greek and Roman poetry and music. It met regularly at Baïf's house in Paris, and had two classes of members — "musicians", or poets, singers and instrumentalists; and "auditors", or subscribers who helped support the academy financially. Baïf's intention was to revitalise and transform French poetry by applying the ancient metres (vers mesurés à l'antique) to it, and combining it with simple music following ancient metres (musique mesurée à l'antique).

Although the ostensible purpose of the Académie was musico-poetic, Baïf's goals were much more ambitious – he hoped that through a structuring of French poetry, he might bring about a more structured social order and morality. This goal followed from Neo-Platonic ideals, where music and morality are closely linked. To this end, discussions were not limited to music and poetry, but also included discussions of Natural philosophy, mathematics, and other subjects. Baïf was influenced at least in part by the Accademia Platonica of Marsilio Ficino in Florence. Other influences on the creation of the Académie were the teacher and poet Jean Daurat, Pierre de Ronsard, and other members of La Pléiade, a literary group.

Despite Baïf's goals of spreading his philosophy, the Académie kept the art of measured poetry and music a secret.

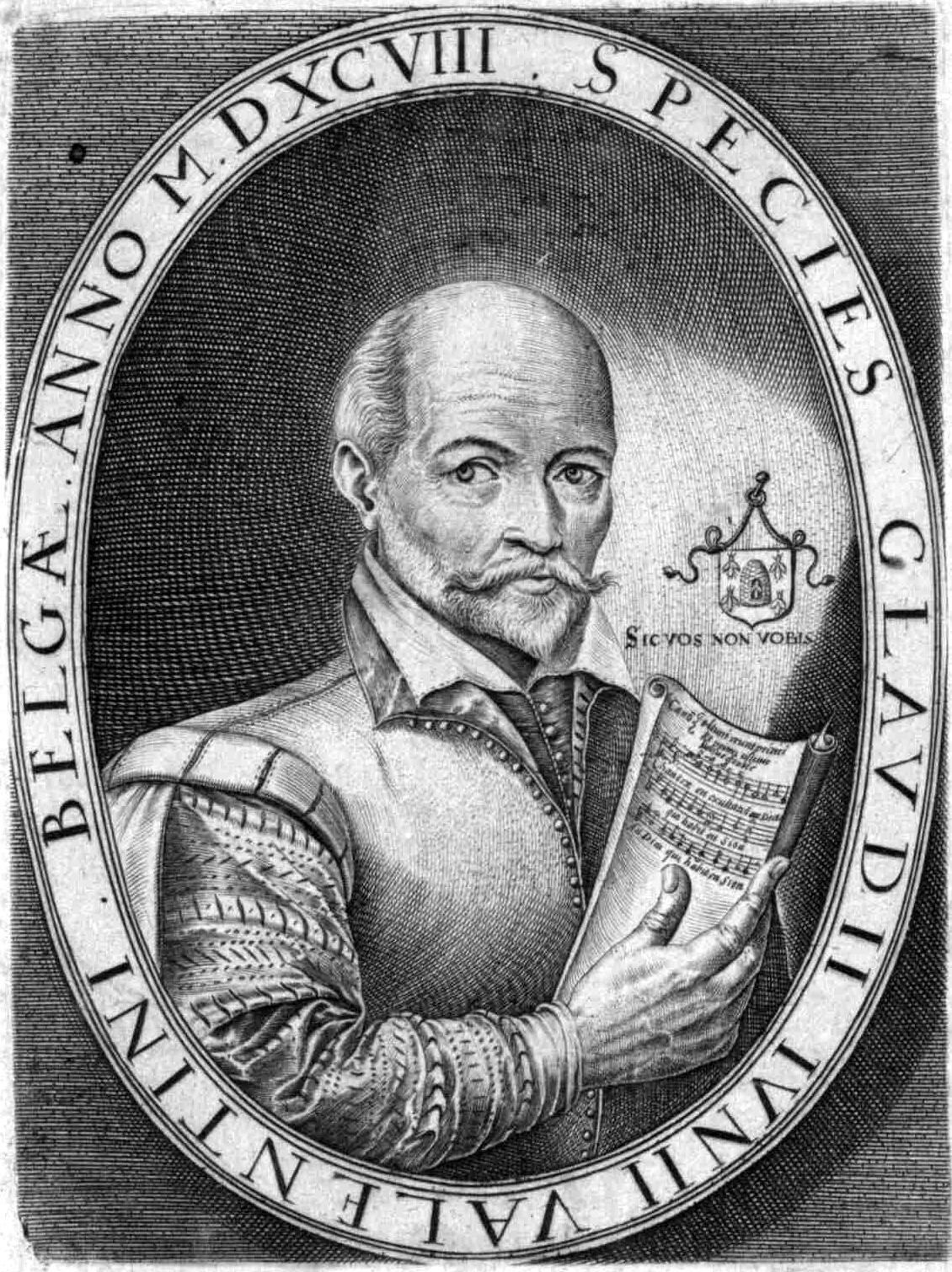
Claude Le Jeune

In order to help further his goals, Baïf enlisted the help of French musicians, the most influential of whom was Claude Le Jeune. Le Jeune's experiments influenced musical setting of French poetry, including the use of irregular metres in the air de cour, for several generations, despite the influence of the academy itself being much shorter in duration. Other musicians involved included Eustache du Caurroy and Jacques Mauduit.

When Charles IX died, the Académie became far less active. It had a renaissance for a short time under Henry III of France when it met in the Louvre under the name Académie du Palais. At this time Guy du Faur de Pibrac took over, and the focus of the group shifted to oratory and debate.

"Revecy venir du printemps"
The chorus and beginning of the verse, by Claude Le Jeune, an example of musique mesurée.
