= Tempo =

Musical concept indicating to the speed of interpretation

Plot of tempos ordered by increasing approximate speed in beats per minute and per second

In musical terminology, tempo (from Italian for 'time'; plural 'tempos', or tempi from the Italian plural), measured in beats per minute, is the speed or pace of a given composition, and is often also an indication of the composition's character or atmosphere. In classical music, tempo is typically indicated with an instruction at the start of a piece (often using conventional Italian terms) and, if a specific metrical pace is desired, is usually measured in beats per minute (bpm or BPM). In modern classical compositions, a "metronome mark" in beats per minute, indicating only measured speed and not any form of expression, may supplement or replace the normal tempo marking, while in modern genres like electronic dance music, tempo will typically simply be stated in bpm.

Tempo (the underlying pulse of the music) is one of the three factors that give a piece of music its texture. The others are meter, which is indicated by a time signature, and articulation, which determines how each note is sounded and how notes are grouped into larger units. While the ability to hold a steady tempo is a vital skill for a musical performer, tempo is malleable. Depending on the genre of a piece of music and the performers' interpretation, a piece may be played with slight variations in tempo, known as tempo rubato, or significant variations. In ensembles, the tempo is often maintained by having players synchronise with a conductor or with a specific instrumentalist, for instance the first violin or the drummer.

== Measurement ==
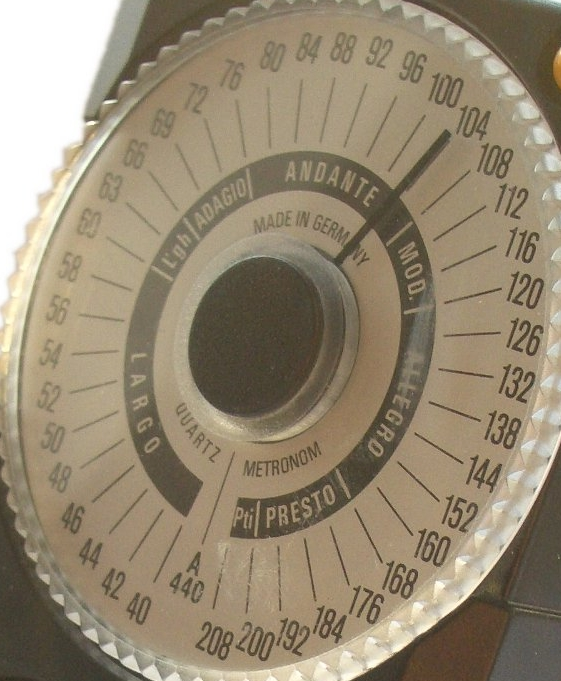
Wittner electronic metronome

120 beats per minute
Click track

Although tempo is described or indicated in many different ways, including with a range of words (e.g., Slowly, Adagio, Quickly, Allegro), it is typically measured in beats per minute (bpm or BPM). For example, a tempo of 60 beats per minute signifies one beat per second, while a tempo of 120 beats per minute is twice as rapid, signifying two beats every second. The note value of a beat will typically be that indicated by the denominator of the time signature. For instance, in 4/4 time, the beat will be a crotchet, or quarter note.

This measurement and indication of tempo became increasingly popular during the first half of the 19th century, after Johann Nepomuk Maelzel invented the metronome. Beethoven was one of the first composers to use the metronome; in the 1810s, he published metronomic indications for the eight symphonies he had composed up to that time.

With the advent of modern electronics, beats per minute became an extremely precise measure. Music sequencers use the bpm system to denote tempo. In popular music genres such as electronic dance music, accurate knowledge of a tune's bpm is important to DJs for the purposes of beatmatching.

The speed of a piece of music can also be gauged according to measures per minute (mpm) or bars per minute (bpm), the number of measures of the piece performed in one minute. This measure is commonly used in ballroom dance music.

== Choosing speed ==
In different musical contexts, different instrumental musicians, singers, conductors, bandleaders, music directors or other individuals will select the tempo of a song or piece. In a popular music or traditional music group or band, the bandleader or drummer may select the tempo. In popular and traditional music, whoever is setting the tempo often counts out one or two bars in tempo. In some songs or pieces in which a singer or solo instrumentalist begins the work with a solo introduction (prior to the start of the full group), the tempo they set will provide the tempo for the group.

In an orchestra or concert band, the conductor normally sets the tempo. In a marching band, the drum major may set the tempo. In a sound recording, in some cases, a record producer may set the tempo for a song (although this would be less likely with an experienced bandleader). Differences in tempo and its interpretation can differ between cultures, as shown by Curt Sachs when comparing Tunisian with Western Classical melodies, while certain genres display rhythmic variation in line with their forms, as occurs with flamenco and its palos.

== Musical vocabulary ==
In classical music, it is customary to describe the tempo of a piece by one or more words, most commonly in Italian, in addition to or instead of a metronome mark in beats per minute. Italian is typically used because it was the language of most composers during the time these descriptions became commonplace in the Western musical lexicon. Some well-known Italian tempo indications include "Allegro" (English "Cheerful"), "Andante" ("Walking-pace") and "Presto" ("Quickly"). This practice developed during the 17th and 18th centuries, the baroque and classical periods. In the earlier Renaissance music, performers understood most music to flow at a tempo defined by the tactus (roughly the rate of the human heartbeat). The mensural time signature indicated which note value corresponded to the tactus.

In the Baroque period, pieces would typically be given an indication, which might be a tempo marking (e.g. Allegro), or the name of a dance (e.g. Allemande or Sarabande), the latter being an indication both of tempo and of metre. Any musician of the time was expected to know how to interpret these markings based on custom and experience. In some cases, however, these markings were simply omitted. For example, the first movement of Bach's Brandenburg Concerto No. 3 has no tempo or mood indication whatsoever. Despite the increasing number of explicit tempo markings, musicians still observe conventions, expecting a minuet to be at a fairly stately tempo, slower than a Viennese waltz; a perpetuum mobile quite fast, and so on. Genres imply tempos, and thus, Ludwig van Beethoven wrote "In tempo d'un Menuetto" over the first movement of his Piano Sonata Op. 54, though that movement is not a minuet.

Many tempo markings also indicate mood and expression. For example, presto and allegro both indicate a speedy execution (presto being faster), but allegro also connotes joy (from its original meaning in Italian). Presto, on the other hand, simply indicates speed. Additional Italian words also indicate tempo and mood. For example, the "agitato" in the Allegro agitato of the last movement of George Gershwin's piano concerto in F has both a tempo indication (undoubtedly faster than a usual Allegro) and a mood indication ("agitated").

Often, composers (or music publishers) name movements of compositions after their tempo (or mood) marking. For instance, the second movement of Samuel Barber's first String Quartet is an Adagio.

=== Basic tempo markings ===
Here follows a list of common tempo markings. The beats per minute (bpm) values are very rough approximations for 4/4 time, and vary widely according to composers and works. A metronome marking cannot be deduced from one of the descriptive Italian or non-Italian terms alone. Where both metronome marking and a word indication occur together, the verbal cue is often also intended to express a style or feeling, which a metronome marking alone cannot do.

It is therefore important to remember that the exact sense of many of these terms has changed over time. One striking example is the use of the term Allegretto. Between its early use in the 18th century and its later use from the 19th century onwards, it has experienced a slight increment in the tempo that it is intended to denote. Originally, it implied a tempo very slightly faster than Andante, whereas now it is often used to indicate one that is just a little slower than Allegro. A similar fate has befallen the terms Adagietto and Andantino. Likewise, the terms Largo and Adagio have experienced a considerable shift with regards to the tempi, in beats per minute, that they are required to express: a modern Largo is slower than Adagio, but in the Baroque period it was faster.

==== Approximately from the slowest to the fastest ====
- Larghissimo – extremely slow, slowest type of tempo (24 bpm and under)
- Adagissimo and Grave – very slow and solemn (24–40 bpm)
- Largo – slow and broad (40–66 bpm)
- Larghetto – rather slow and broad (44–66 bpm)
- Lento – slow (40–60 bpm)
- Adagio – slow with great expression (44–66 bpm)
- Adagietto – slower than andante or slightly faster than adagio (46–80 bpm)
- Andante – at a walking pace, moderately slow (56–108 bpm)
- Andantino – slightly faster than andante, but slower than moderato (80–108 bpm) (although, in some cases, it can be taken to mean slightly slower than andante)
- Marcia moderato – moderately, in the manner of a march (66–80 bpm)
- Andante moderato – between andante and moderato (at a moderate walking speed) (80–108 bpm)
- Moderato – at a moderate speed (108–120 bpm)
- Allegretto – by the mid-19th century, moderately fast (112–120 bpm); see paragraph above for earlier usage
- Allegro moderato – close to, but not quite allegro (116–120 bpm)
- Allegro – fast and bright (120–156 bpm)
- Molto Allegro or Allegro vivace – at least slightly faster and livelier than allegro, but always at its range (and no faster than vivace) (124–156 bpm)
- Vivace – lively and fast (156–176 bpm)
- Vivacissimo and Allegrissimo – very fast, lively and bright (172–176 bpm)
- Presto – very fast (168–200 bpm)
- Prestissimo – extremely fast (200 bpm and over)

==== Additional terms ====
- A piacere or Ad libitum in Latin – the performer may use their own discretion with regard to tempo and rhythm; literally "at pleasure"
- Accelerando – gradually play faster
- Assai – (very) much
- A tempo – resume previous tempo
- Con Brio – with vigor
- Con grazia – with grace, or gracefully
- Con moto – Italian for "with movement"; can be combined with a tempo indication, e.g., Andante con moto
- Furioso or Furibondo – 'furiously'
- Lamentoso – sadly, plaintively
- L'istesso, L'istesso tempo, or Lo stesso tempo – at the same speed; L'istesso is used when the actual speed of the music has not changed, despite apparent signals to the contrary, such as changes in time signature or note length (half notes in 4/4 could change to whole notes in 2/2, and they would all have the same duration)
- Ma non tanto – but not so much; used in the same way and has the same effect as Ma non troppo (see immediately below) but to a lesser degree
- Ma non troppo – but not too much; used to modify a basic tempo to indicate that the basic tempo should be reined in to a degree; for example, Adagio ma non troppo to mean "Slow, but not too much", Allegro ma non troppo to mean "Fast, but not too much"
- Maestoso – majestically, stately
- Molto – very
- Meno – less
- Più – more
- Poco – little
- Rall. or "Rallentando" – opposite of Accelerando
- Subito – suddenly
- Tempo comodo – at a comfortable speed
- Tempo di... – the speed of a ... (such as Tempo di valse (speed of a waltz, . ≈ 60 bpm or ≈ 126 bpm), Tempo di marcia (speed of a march, ≈ 120 bpm))
- Tempo giusto – at a consistent speed, at the 'right' speed, in strict tempo
- Tempo primo – resume the original (first) tempo
- Tempo semplice – simple, regular speed, plainly

==== French tempo markings ====
Several composers have written markings in French, among them baroque composers François Couperin and Jean-Philippe Rameau as well as Claude Debussy, Olivier Messiaen, Maurice Ravel and Alexander Scriabin. Erik Satie was known to write extensive tempo (and character) markings by defining them in a poetical and literal way, as in his Gnossiennes. Common tempo markings in French are:

- Au mouvement – play the (first or main) tempo.
- Grave – slowly and solemnly
- Lent – slowly
- Moins – less, as in Moins vite (less fast)
- Modéré – at a moderate tempo
- Vif – lively
- Très – very, as in Très vif (very lively)
- Vite – fast
- Rapide – rapidly

==== German tempo markings ====
Many composers have used German tempo markings. Typical German tempo markings are:

- Kräftig – vigorous or powerful
- Langsam – slowly
- Lebhaft – lively (mood)
- Mäßig – moderately
- Rasch – quickly
- Schnell – fast
- Bewegt – animated, with motion

One of the first German composers to use tempo markings in his native language was Ludwig van Beethoven, but only sparsely. Robert Schumann followed afterwards with increasingly specific markings, and later composers like Hindemith and Mahler would further elaborate on combined tempo and mood instructions in German. For example, the second movement of Mahler's Symphony No. 9 is marked Im Tempo eines gemächlichen Ländlers, etwas täppisch und sehr derb, indicating a slowish folk-dance-like movement, with some awkwardness and much vulgarity in the execution. Mahler would also sometimes combine German tempo markings with traditional Italian markings, as in the first movement of his sixth symphony, marked Allegro energico, ma non troppo. Heftig, aber markig (Energetically quick, but not too much. Violent, but vigorous.)

==== English tempo markings ====
English indications, for example quickly, have also been used by Benjamin Britten and Percy Grainger, among many others. In jazz and popular music lead sheets and fake book charts, terms like fast, laid back, steady rock, mid-tempo, medium, medium-up, ballad, brisk, brightly, up, slowly, and similar style indications may appear. In some lead sheets and fake books, both tempo and genre are indicated, e.g., slow blues, fast swing, or medium Latin. The genre indications help rhythm section instrumentalists use the correct style. For example, if a song says medium shuffle, the drummer plays a shuffle drum pattern; if it says fast boogie-woogie, the piano player plays a boogie-woogie bassline.

Show tempo, a term used since the early days of vaudeville, describes the traditionally brisk tempo (usually 160–170 bpm) of opening songs in stage revues and musicals.

Humourist Tom Lehrer uses facetious English tempo markings in his anthology Too Many Songs by Tom Lehrer. For example, "National Brotherhood Week" is to be played fraternally; "We Will All Go Together" is marked eschatologically; and "Masochism Tango" has the tempo painstakingly. His English contemporaries Flanders and Swann have similarly marked scores, with the music for their song "The Whale (Moby Dick)" shown as oceanlike and vast.

== Variation through a piece ==
Tempo is not necessarily fixed. Within a piece (or within a movement of a longer work), a composer may indicate a complete change of tempo, often by using a double bar and introducing a new tempo indication, often with a new time signature and/or key signature.

It is also possible to indicate a more or less gradual change in tempo, for instance with an accelerando (speeding up) or ritardando (rit., slowing down) marking. Indeed, some compositions chiefly comprise accelerando passages, for instance Monti's Csárdás, or the Russian Civil War song Echelon Song.

On the smaller scale, tempo rubato refers to changes in tempo within a musical phrase, often described as some notes 'borrowing' time from others.

=== Terms for change in tempo ===
Composers may use expressive marks to adjust the tempo:

- Accelerando – speeding up (abbreviation: accel.); the opposite of ritardando. It is defined by gradually increasing the tempo until the next tempo mark is noted. It is either marked by a dashed line or simply its abbreviation
- Affrettando – speeding up with a suggestion of anxiety
- Allargando – growing broader; decreasing tempo, usually near the end of a piece
- Calando – going slower (and usually also softer)
- Doppio movimento / doppio più mosso – double-speed
- Doppio più lento – half-speed
- Lentando – gradually slowing, and softer
- Meno mosso – less movement; slower
- Meno moto – less motion
- Più mosso – more movement; faster
- Mosso – movement, more lively; quicker, much like più mosso, but not as extreme
- Precipitando – hurrying; going faster/forward
- Rallentando – a gradual slowing down (abbreviation: rall.)
- Ritardando – slowing down gradually; also see rallentando and ritenuto (abbreviations: rit., ritard.) sometimes replaces allargando
- Ritenuto – slightly slower, but achieved more immediately than rallentando or ritardando; a sudden decrease in tempo; temporarily holding back. (Note that the abbreviation for ritenuto can also be rit. Thus, a more specific abbreviation is riten. Also, sometimes ritenuto does not reflect a tempo change but rather a 'character' change)
- Rubato – free adjustment of tempo for expressive purposes, literally "stolen"—so more strictly, to take time from one beat to slow another
- Slargando – gradually slowing down, literally "slowing down", "widening" or "stretching"
- Stretto – in a faster tempo, often used near the conclusion of a section. (Note that in fugal compositions, the term stretto refers to the imitation of the subject in close succession, before the subject is completed, and as such, suitable for the close of the fugue. Used in this context, the term is not necessarily related to tempo.)
- Stringendo – pressing on faster, literally "tightening"
- Tardando – slowing down gradually (same as ritardando)
- Tempo Primo – resume the original tempo

While the base tempo indication (such as Allegro) typically appears in large type above the staff, adjustments typically appear below the staff or, in the case of keyboard instruments, in the middle of the grand staff.

They generally designate a gradual change in tempo; for immediate tempo shifts, composers normally just provide the designation for the new tempo. (Note, however, that when Più mosso or Meno mosso appears in large type above the staff, it functions as a new tempo, and thus implies an immediate change.) Several terms, e.g., assai, molto, poco, subito, control how large and how gradual a change should be (see common qualifiers).

After a tempo change, a composer may return to a previous tempo in two ways:

- a tempo – returns to the base tempo after an adjustment (e.g. ritardando ... a tempo undoes the effect of the ritardando)
- Tempo primo or Tempo I^{o} – denotes an immediate return to the piece's original base tempo after a section in a different tempo (e.g. Allegro ... Lento ... Moderato ... Tempo I^{o} indicates a return to the Allegro). This indication often functions as a structural marker in pieces in binary form.

These terms also indicate an immediate, not a gradual, tempo change. Although they are Italian, composers tend to employ them even if they have written their initial tempo marking in another language.

=== Tempo–rhythm interaction ===
One difficulty in defining tempo is the dependence of its perception on rhythm, and, conversely, the dependence of rhythm perception on tempo. Furthermore, the tempo-rhythm interaction is context dependent, as explained by Andranik Tangian using an example of the leading rhythm of ″Promenade″ from Modest Mussorgsky's Pictures at an Exhibition:

This rhythm is perceived as it is rather than as the first three events repeated at a double tempo (denoted as R012 = repeat from 0, one time, twice faster):

R012

However, the motive with this rhythm in the Mussorgsky's piece

is rather perceived as a repeat

R012

This context-dependent perception of tempo and rhythm is explained by the principle of correlative perception, according to which data are perceived in the simplest way. From the viewpoint of Kolmogorov's complexity theory, this means a representation of the data that minimizes the amount of memory.

The example considered suggests two alternative representations of the same rhythm: as it is, and as the rhythm-tempo interaction — a two-level representation in terms of a generative rhythmic pattern and a "tempo curve". Table 1 displays these possibilities both with and without pitch, assuming that one duration requires one byte of information, one byte is needed for the pitch of one tone, and invoking the repeat algorithm with its parameters R012 takes four bytes. As shown in the bottom row of the table, the rhythm without pitch requires fewer bytes if it is "perceived" as it is, without repetitions and tempo leaps. On the contrary, its melodic version requires fewer bytes if the rhythm is "perceived" as being repeated at a double tempo.

Complexity of representation of time events
	Rhythm only		Rhythm with pitch	
	Complete coding	Coding as repeat	Complete coding	Coding as repeat
	quarter note eighth note	R012	quarter note eighth note	R012
Complexity of rhythmic pattern	6 bytes	3 bytes	12 bytes	6 bytes
Complexity of its transformation	0 bytes	4 bytes	0 bytes	4 bytes
Total complexity	6 bytes	7 bytes	12 bytes	10 bytes

Thus, the loop of interdependence of rhythm and tempo is overcome due to the simplicity criterion, which "optimally" distributes the complexity of perception between rhythm and tempo. In the above example, the repetition is recognized because of additional repetition of the melodic contour, which results in a certain redundancy of the musical structure, making the recognition of the rhythmic pattern "robust" under tempo deviations. Generally speaking, the more redundant the "musical support" of a rhythmic pattern, the better its recognizability under augmentations and diminutions, that is, its distortions are perceived as tempo variations rather than rhythmic changes:

By taking into account melodic context, homogeneity of accompaniment, harmonic pulsation, and other cues, the range of admissible tempo deviations can be extended further, yet still not preventing musically normal perception. For example, Scriabin's own performance of his "Poem", Op. 32, No. 1, transcribed from a piano-roll recording contains tempo deviations within . = 19/119, a span of 5.5 times. Such tempo deviations are strictly prohibited, for example, in Bulgarian or Turkish music based on so-called additive rhythms with complex duration ratios, which can also be explained by the principle of correlativity of perception. If a rhythm is not structurally redundant, then even minor tempo deviations are not perceived as accelerando or ritardando but rather given an impression of a change in rhythm, which implies an inadequate perception of musical meaning.

== Modern classical music ==
Twentieth-century classical music introduced a wide range of approaches to tempo, particularly due to the influence of modernism and later postmodernism.

While many composers have retained traditional tempo markings, sometimes requiring greater precision than in any preceding period, others have begun to question basic assumptions of the classical tradition like the idea of a consistent, unified, repeatable tempo. Graphic scores show tempo and rhythm in a variety of ways. Polytemporal compositions deliberately utilise performers playing at marginally different speeds. John Cage's compositions approach tempo in diverse ways. For instance, 4′33″ has a defined duration, but no actual notes, while As Slow as Possible has defined proportions but no defined duration, with one performance intended to last 639 years.

== Beatmatching ==
In popular music genres such as disco, house music and electronic dance music, beatmatching is a technique that DJs use that involves speeding up or slowing down a record (or CDJ player, a speed-adjustable CD player for DJ use) to match the tempo of a previous or subsequent track, so both can be seamlessly mixed. Having beatmatched two songs, the DJ can either seamlessly crossfade from one song to another, or play both tracks simultaneously, creating a layered effect.

DJs often beatmatch the underlying tempos of recordings, rather than their strict bpm value suggested by the kick drum, particularly when dealing with high-tempo tracks. A 240 bpm track, for example, matches the beat of a 120 bpm track without slowing down or speeding up, because both have an underlying tempo of 120 quarter notes per minute. Thus, some soul music (around 75–90 bpm) mixes well with a drum and bass beat (from 150 to 185 bpm). When speeding up or slowing down a record on a turntable, the pitch and tempo of a track are linked: spinning a disc 10% faster makes both pitch and tempo 10% higher. Software processing to change the pitch without changing the tempo is called pitch-shifting. The opposite operation, changing the tempo without changing the pitch, is called time-stretching.

== See also ==
- A capriccio
- Alla breve
- As Slow as Possible
- Bell pattern
- Half-time (music)
- Multitemporal music
- Stop-time
