= Musique mesurée =

Musique mesurée à l'antique (French: [myzik məzyʁe a lɑ̃tik]) was a style of vocal musical composition in France in the late 16th century. In musique mesurée, longer syllables in the French language were set to longer note values, and shorter syllables to shorter, in a homophonic texture but in a situation of metric fluidity, in an attempt to imitate contemporary understanding of Ancient Greek music. Although this compositional method did not attain popularity at first, it attracted some of the most famous composers of the time. Its basis in a desire to re-create the artistic ethos of Ancient Greece, especially in respect to text declamation, had a strong similarity to contemporary movements in Italy, such as the work of the Florentine Camerata which engendered the first operas, and brought about the beginning of the Baroque era in music.

== History ==
Pieces written as musique mesurée were settings of the poetical form known as vers mesurés. Beginning in the late 1560s in Paris, under the direction of Jean-Antoine de Baïf, a group of poets known as the Pléiade attempted to recreate the metrical effect of ancient Greek and Latin poetry in French, using the quantitative principles of those languages. The attempt was more than an academic one: Baïf and his associates, horrified by the barbarity of the age, including the bloody religious wars which raged throughout the last decades of the century, sought to improve mankind by bringing back the ancient diction, which was believed to have had a positive ethical effect on its hearers. For this attempt they had the approval of the current king of France, Charles IX, and they met in secret to plan their musical revolution. Baïf, with the royal patent, founded the Académie de Poésie et de Musique in 1570, along with his intimate musical associate Joachim Thibault de Courville. Poet Pierre de Ronsard was also involved in the group.

As originally planned, the members of the Académie would be in a hierarchy of two grades: first, the composers and singers, known as the professionnels, and after that, the gentleman listeners, known as the auditeurs, who were also to provide financial backing for the enterprise. Aside from this small group of aristocrats, no one else was invited. The concerts took place at Baïf's house in Paris: Charles IX himself, who provided much of the patronage, was often present.

Some of the house rules have been recorded. There was to be no talking, or disturbances of any kind, during the singing, and anyone who came in late had to wait until the end of a piece to be seated – rather like modern concert-hall etiquette. Musicians were to rehearse every day, and no music was to be copied or taken away from the area of performance. The music was so closely guarded, at least during the early years of the Académie, that no music of the originating composer – Courville – is known to have survived.

The Académie was short-lived, and probably did not survive after 1573, the year of the death of Charles IX. Another similar group, the Académie du Palais, which met at the Louvre after 1573 with the backing of the new king, Henri III, seemed to carry on some of the work of the previous group, but its aim seems to have been more to debate philosophical issues than to reform humanity through reviving Ancient Greek and Latin poetry and music. The activities, if any, of the original Académie after this time are poorly-documented: while the musicians continued to meet, it is not known if they met in a formal setting, as they had prior to the death of Charles IX. This was during a period of increasing religious turmoil, ending in the fighting in Paris in 1589, and the assassination of the king; associations of humanists such as the Académie, which included both Catholics and Protestants, became increasingly difficult (Baïf, a Catholic, even wrote a sonnet in 1572 praising the St. Bartholomew's Day Massacre; Claude Le Jeune, a Protestant, was nearly murdered during the siege of Paris in 1589).

Even though the original Académie had faded away within a few years of its founding, several prominent composers found the concept of musique mesurée to be so attractive as to make it their primary compositional method. The most famous of these was Claude Le Jeune, followed by Jacques Mauduit, Eustache Du Caurroy, Nicolas de La Grotte, and Guillaume Costeley.

== Musical style ==
When musique mesurée first appeared, it was used mainly in French secular songs known as chansons. Most of the chansons written in the style were for five voices, unaccompanied, although instruments began to be used as accompaniment before long. Typically they consisted of a strophe and a refrain; the refrain would have the same music each time it recurred. As composers realized the adaptability of the musical style to other forms, they began to employ it elsewhere, for example in sacred music, such as psalm settings.

The texture of the music was almost uniformly homophonic, with all the voices singing essentially the same rhythm. The repeating pattern of longs and shorts, following the poetry, was irregular, leading to the perception to a modern ear of irregular meters. Occasional short melismas – decorative passages to ease the monotonous rhythm – appeared in many of the parts, especially in the work of Claude Le Jeune.

Long and short syllables were invariably set in a 2:1 relation, for example quarter-notes on the longs and eighth-notes on the shorts. This was in order to mirror long and short syllables used in classical poetry, which in contemporary poetry would be stress accents. In modern notation, the meters would be irregular; often music in the musique mesurée is left unbarred in modern transcription, or given bar lines only at the end of phrases.

In addition to their use of ancient metres, composers of musique mesurée also used later interpretations of classical musical modes in order to move the emotions of their listeners, as it was described in ancient Greek sources.

== Influence ==
While musique mesurée was created and sung by a small group of people for a limited audience, and for the most part in secret, it was to have a profound effect on French music for the next hundred years. The air de cour, the secular style of song which dominated the musical scene in France beginning in the 1580s, used the principles of musique mesurée with the difference that it usually used rhyming verse. In addition, even in the late 17th century, the influence of musique mesurée can be seen in the style of French recitative, both in opera and in sacred music.

Composers that continued using the methods of musique mesurée into the 17th century included Jacques Mauduit, who used it for creating large works for mixed vocal and instrumental forces, roughly in the Venetian style, and Eustache Du Caurroy, who used the method for psalm settings. In Harmonie universelle (1636), Marin Mersenne praised Du Caurroy as the finest practitioner of the style.

== Media ==
"Revecy venir du printemps"
The chorus and beginning of the verse by Claude Le Jeune.

== References and further reading ==
Inline

General

- Brown, Howard Mayer; Richard Freedman. "Vers mesurés (subscription access)". Grove Music Online.
- Gleason, Harold; Warren Becker (1986). Music in the Middle Ages and Renaissance. Music Literature Outlines Series I. Bloomington, Indiana: Frangipani Press. ISBN 0-89917-034-X.
- Reese, Gustave (1954). Music in the Renaissance (Revised ed.). New York: W.W. Norton & Co. ISBN 0-393-09530-4.
- Don Randel, ed. (1986). "Musique mesurée". The New Harvard Dictionary of Music. Cambridge, Massachusetts: Harvard University Press. ISBN 0-674-61525-5.
