= Jehan Chardavoine =

French composer

Jehan Chardavoine (baptized on 2 February 1538 at Beaufort-en-Vallée, Anjou – died c. 1580) was a French Renaissance composer mostly active in Paris. He was one of the first known editors of popular chansons, and the author, according to musicologist Julien Tiersot, of "the only volume of monodic songs from the 16th century that has survived to our days."

== Biography ==
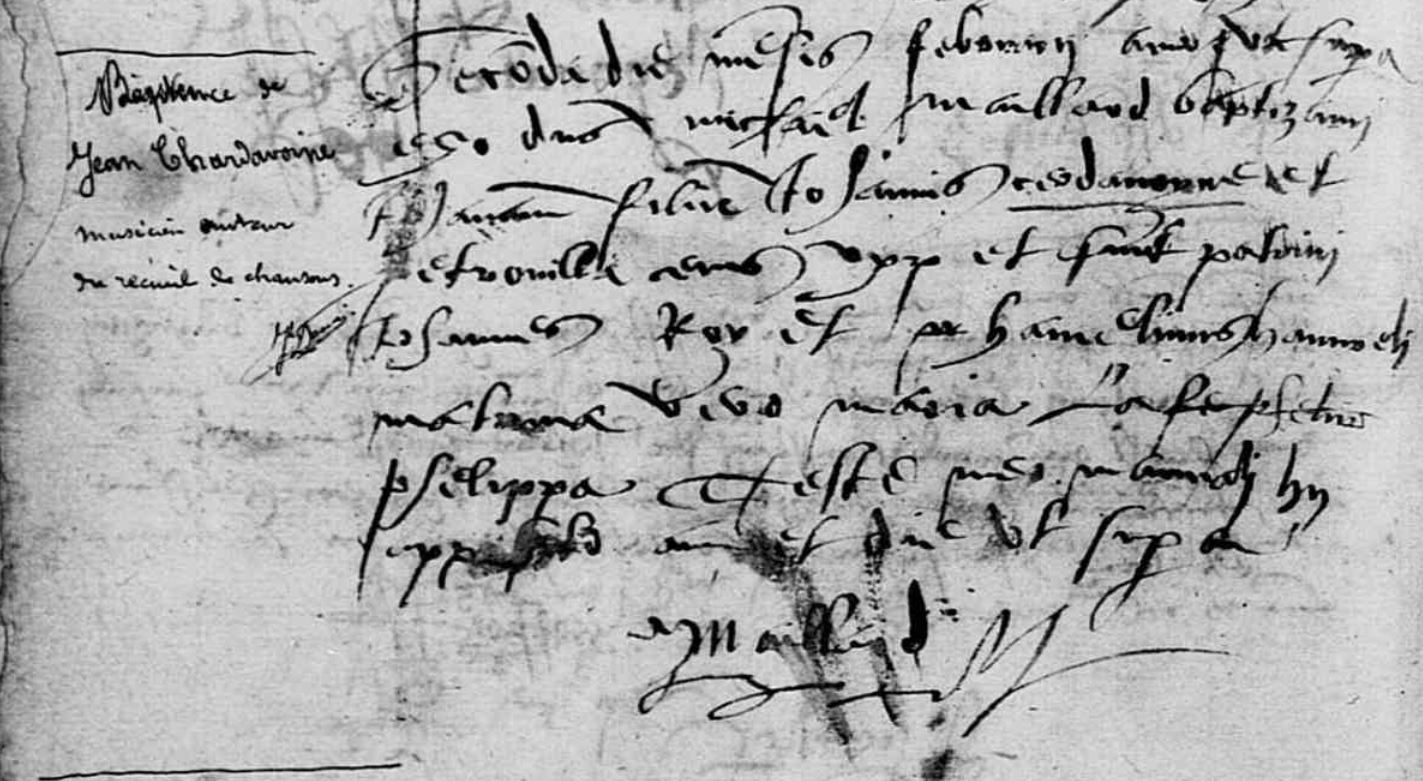
Baptismal certificate of Jean Chardavoine.

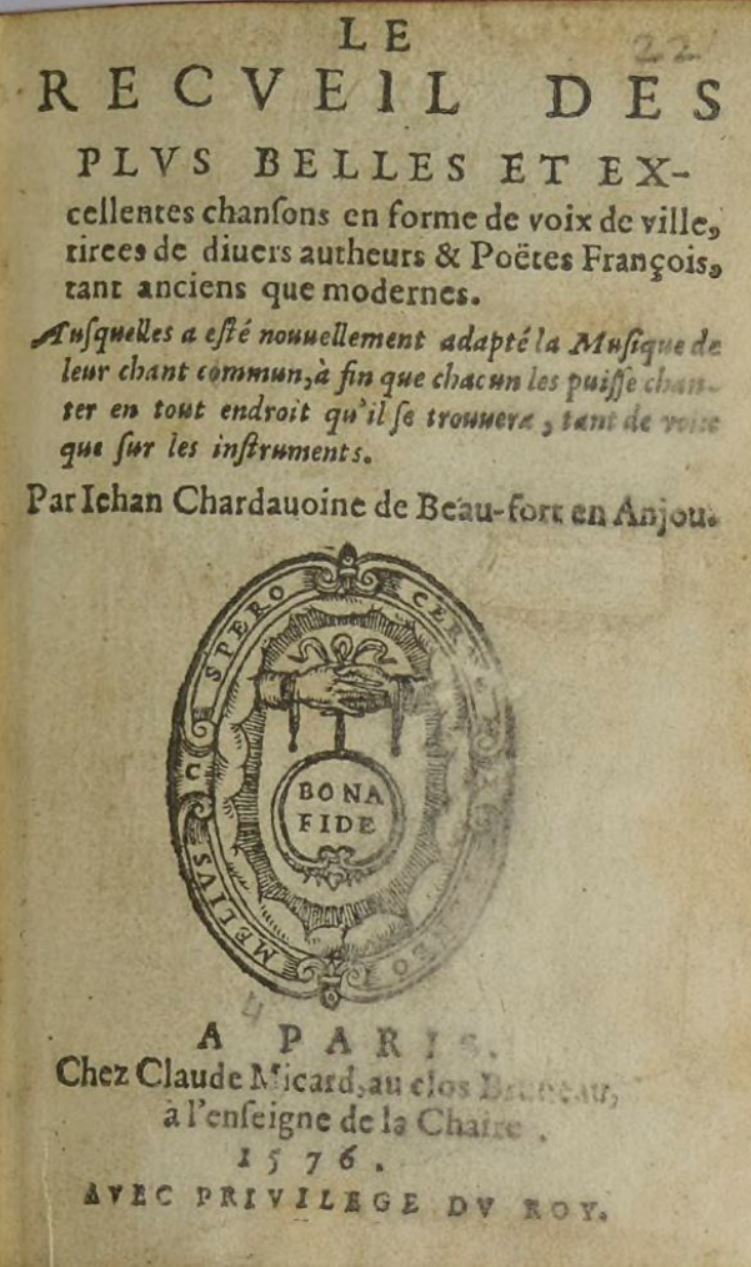
Title page of the Recueil, 1576. (Paris BnF)

Jehan Chardavoine is mostly known for his publication, Recueil des plus belles et excellentes chansons en forme de voix de ville, tirées de divers autheurs et Poëtes François, tant anciens que modernes. Ausquelles a esté nouvellement adaptée la Musique de leur chant commun, à fin que chacun les puisse chanter en tout endroit qu'il se trouvera, tant de voix que sur les instruments ("Collection of the most beautiful and excellent songs in the form of voix de ville, taken from various French authors and poets, both ancient and modern. To which texts have been newly adapted the music of their main tune, so that anyone may sing it at whichever place they may be, on voice as well as on instruments."). Published in 1576, it is the oldest collection of French popular songs ever printed. It begins with an epistle addressed to "The readers", "on this 12th day of November, 1575". It contains 186 songs based on strophic poems. Some of the songs were simply collected and published by Chardavoine, while others are his own adaptation to monody of previous polyphonic works by composers such as Jacques Arcadelt, Pierre Certon, and Pierre Cléreau. In most cases, he has transformed the original music to such an extent that it can be considered a new work.

Some of the poems to which Chardavoine adapted new music were anonymous, while others were by poets of his time, such as Clément Marot, Mellin de Saint-Gelais, Jean-Antoine de Baïf, Pierre de Ronsard and Joachim du Bellay.

Among the poems set to music and published in his anthology are the famous Mignonne allons voir si la rose and Ma petite colombelle, by Ronsard; Si vous regardez madame, by Du Bellay; and Longtemps y a que je vis en espoir, by Marot. Some of these airs have been reused by the polyphonists.

== Bibliography ==
- Joseph Denais, Un musicien du XVI^{e} siècle : Jean Chardavoine, de Beaufort en Anjou, et le premier recueil imprimé de chansons populaires en 1575-1576. Paris : Techener, 1889.
- Julien Tiersot, Histoire de la chanson populaire en France, Paris, Plon, 1889 - reprint by Nabu Press, 2010, ISBN 1-1425-1829-9
- Claude Frissard, À propos d'un recueil de « Chansons » de Jehan Chardavoine, in Revue de musicologie, Vol. 30, No. 85/88 (1948), pp. 58–75 (available online)
- André Verchaly, Le recueil authentique des chansons de Jehan Chardavoine (1576), in Revue de musicologie, Vol. 49, No. 127 (December 1963), pp. 203–219 (available online)
- Franck Jubeau, Un praticien-musicien du XVI^{e} siècle - Jehan Chardavoine et son recueil, mémoire de maîtrise, Université de Tours, 1999

== Discography ==
- Mignonne allons voir si la rose, by the Ensemble vocal Philippe Caillard (1964)
- Mignonne allons voir si la rose, by Les Ménestriers (1972)
- Ma petite Colombelle, by Les Ménestriers (1972)
- Mignonne allons voir si la rose, Guide des instruments de la Renaissance, Ricercar, RIC 95 001 A, 1995, CD 1 (instrumental version)
