= Claude Coffin =

17th-century French cantor and composer

Claude Coffin was a French cantor and composer, active in Paris during the first third of the 17th century.

== Biography ==
Not much is known of his life except his office of cantor of the Chapel of music of the king. In 1625, an act reveals this office and his address in the rue de la Mortellerie.

He must have acquired a certain notoriety since in 1636 Marin Mersenne included a fugue of him in his Harmonie universelle and praised the quality of his compositions: "The notes which follow show more clearly what I have just said, and contain a fugue composed by Sieur Coffin, one of the oldest and best disciples of Du Caurroy.

This mention tells us also that he was one of the students of Eustache Du Caurroy, a very skilful countrapuntist working for the King's Chapel.

== Works ==
=== Psaulms set in music ===
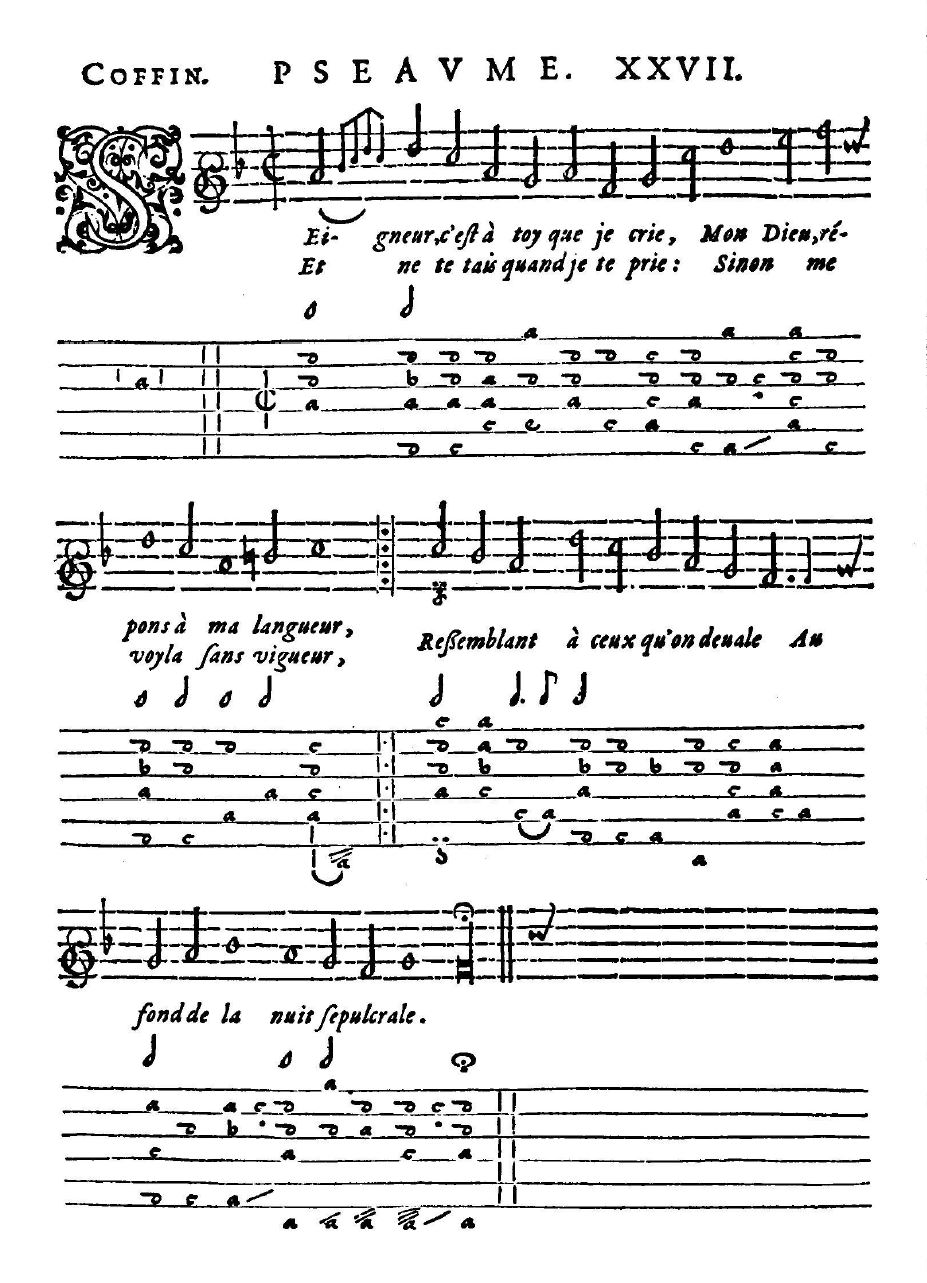
Psalm XXVII by Desportes set to music for voice and lute by Claude Coffin (1617)

On an unknown date, Coffin published Psalmes de David, à 3, 4 et 5 voix by Pierre I Ballard. These psalms were most probably written on the translation of Philippe Desportes; The two psalms published for voice and lute in 1617 (see below) were probably part of this corpus.

=== Court and ballet arias ===
A few of his were published in various collections:

- Two tunes and two psalms for voice and lute in the "Seventh Book" of Airs de différents auteurs mis en tablature par eux-mêmes (Paris, Pierre I Ballard, 1617 : RISM 1617 exp 8, Guillo 2003 n° 1617-A :

- Je suis amour le grand maistre des Dieux (Also published for single voice the same year: Guillo 2003 n° 1617-B)
- C’en est fait je ne croyray plus (idem)
- Seigneur, c’est à toy que je crie (Ps. XXVII translated by Philippe Desportes)
- Heureux qui d’un soin pitoyables (Ps. XL, translated by Philippe Desportes)

- Four tunes for voice and lute in the "Eighth book" of the same collection (Paris, Pierre I Ballard, 1618 : RISM 1618 exp 9 and S 3419, Guillo 2003 n° 1618-A), All four republished for single voice the following year (Guillo 2003 n° 1619-A) :

- Je me meurs, je suis à la gesne
- En fin par le secours de ma raison
- Dieu que je fus heureux
- Les voyci de retour remplis d’amour

Two arias from the Ballet des Indiens (Paris, 1621) published in Airs de cour de différents auteurs (Paris, Pierre I Ballard, 1621 : RISM 1621 exp 13, Guillo 2003 n° 1621B) :

- Favoris des dieux et du jour, nous quittons l’indien séjour
- Six bergers viennent de Trasse suivant les pas et la trasse

- A fugue with three voices on Vive le Roy, vive le Roy Louis appears in the Livre cinquième de la composition de musique of the Harmonie universelle in 1636.

== Bibliography ==
- Marc Desmet, La paraphrase des psaumes de Philippe Desportes et ses différentes versions musicales. Thèse de doctorat inédite, Université François-Rabelais de Tours, 1994.
- Laurent Guillo : Pierre I Ballard et Robert III Ballard : imprimeurs du roy pour la musique (1599–1673). Liège : Mardaga et Versailles : CMBV, 2003. 2 vol. ISBN 2-87009-810-3.
- Madeleine Jurgens, Documents du minutier central concernant l'histoire de la musique (1600–1650). [1 : études I-X]. Paris, 1967.
