= Joachim Thibault de Courville =

French composer

Joachim Thibault de Courville (died 1581) was a French composer, singer, lutenist, and player of the lyre, of the late Renaissance. He was a close associate of poet Jean Antoine de Baïf, and with Baïf was the co-founder of the Académie de Poésie et de Musique, which attempted to re-create the storied ethical and moral effect of ancient Greek music through a type of vocal musical composition known as musique mesurée.

Very little is known of Courville's life prior to his association with Baïf. Sometime in the mid-1560s Courville made the acquaintance of the famous poet, who was so impressed with his playing and singing that he called him "the master of the art of singing well." During this period Courville was employed as official lyre-player to King Charles IX. In 1567 Courville began to collaborate with Baïf on the composition of vers mesurés, verses written mostly by Baïf in which the French words were given long-short syllabic treatment in imitation of the supposed method used in Ancient Greek dramatic poetry; Courville set them to music. In 1570 the two, with the backing of the king, founded the Académie de Poésie et de Musique, inviting a few other professional musicians and aristocratic patrons; however they maintained a high level of secrecy in their undertaking, which was intended to reform not only music, but mankind. Baïf and Courville, reading accounts of the ethical and moral effects of such dramatic poetry in Ancient Greece, believed that hearers of their new musique mesurée, could be moved to become virtuous. The members of the Académie planned to perform their music widely once they had perfected their method.

The Académie disbanded after several years, probably under the stress of the religious violence which tore France apart during the last third of the 16th century, for both Protestants and Catholics were members, and King Henri III (who assumed the throne on the death of Charles IX in 1574) wanted to change the character of the Académie from a musical to a philosophical institution. By the 1580s the style Courville had developed was being used for setting of highly secular, sometimes sacrilegious, and occasionally erotic verse, something which was probably not his original intent.

No music by Courville has directly survived: he maintained secrecy as ordered by the Académie, and published none of his own music. However some of the chansons published by others, for example Fabrice Caietain and Claude Le Jeune, are presumed to contain either passages by Courville or stylistic copies. Courville died in 1581 in Paris.

Courville's lyre was a unique instrument, consisting of eleven strings, and often being played with a bow. It was modeled after a supposed Ancient Greek instrument.

== References and further reading ==
- Frank Dobbins: "Joachim Thibault de Courville", Grove Music Online, ed. L. Macy (Accessed July 12, 2006), (subscription access)
- Gustave Reese, Music in the Renaissance. New York, W.W. Norton & Co., 1954. ISBN 0-393-09530-4
- Jeanice Brooks, Courtly Song in Late Sixteenth-Century France. Chicago, The University of Chicago Press, 2000. ISBN 0-226-07587-7
