= Joan Albert Ban =

Dutch Catholic priest and composer

Joan Albert Ban (1597–1644) was a Dutch Catholic priest and composer.

== Life ==
From 1628-42 he was canon priest of the Haarlem chapter (Kapittel). In 1630 he became priest of the Begijnhof in Haarlem, across the street from the Janskerk (Haarlem). Musically self-taught, he corresponded with Marin Mersenne. This correspondence was begun thanks to Constantijn Huygens, who later joined the correspondence, as did Descartes, of whom Ban was a great admirer. Ban also wrote a Dissertio epistolica de musicae natura in 1637 on musical evolution and 'musica flexanima' (melodic intervals and their emotional effects), sending copies to his correspondents. Ban sent Mersenne some of his compositions and, though the latter criticised them heavily and though Mersenne later weighted a musical competition between Ban and Antoine Boësset in favour of the latter, he and Ban continued to correspond. He also corresponded with P. C. Hooft and later Joost van den Vondel wrote a poem in honor of his compositions that were published in 1642 under the title Zangh-Bloemzel Van Ioan Albert Ban Haerlemmer, Dat is, Staeltjes van den zinroerenden zangh, Met dry stemmen, En den Gemeene-Grondstem. Boovezangh. t'Amsterdam, by Paulus Matthijsz. Voor Louys Elzevier op 't Water, inden Olm-Boom 1642. Neffens een kort Zangh-bericht, Ten dienste van alle Vaderlandtsche Zangh-lievers.

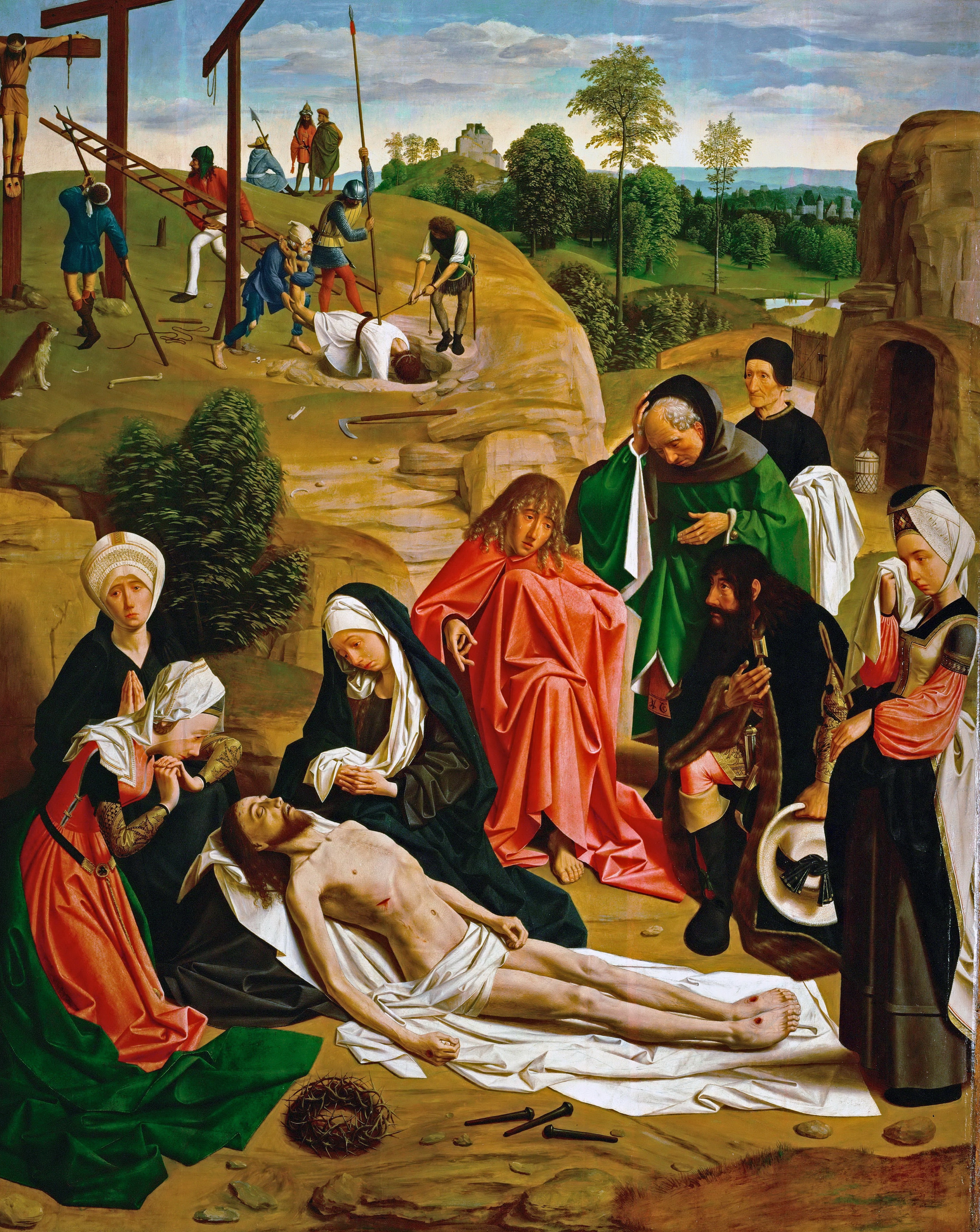
Geertgen painted The Lamentation of Christ for the altarpiece of the church of the Knights of Saint John in Haarlem.

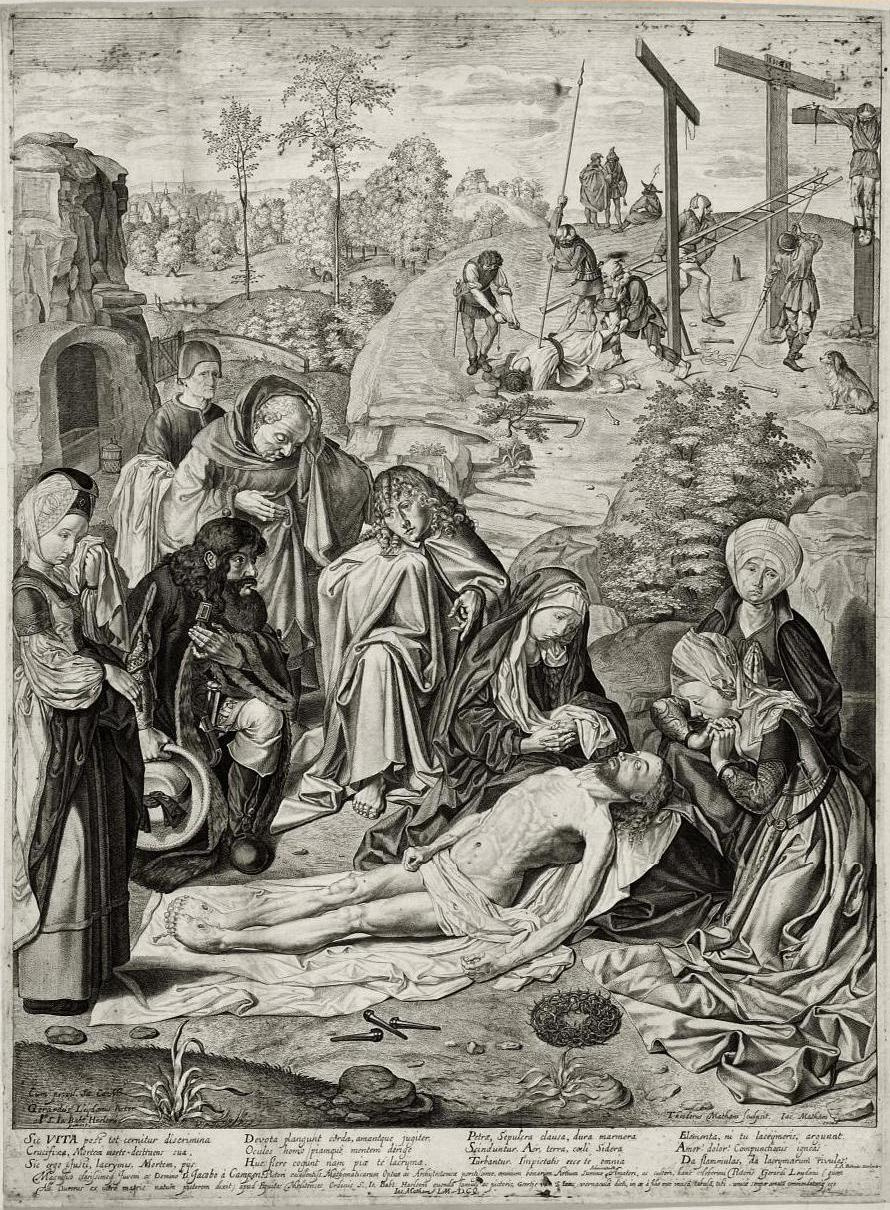
Mirror image engraving in 1620 by Jacob Matham, includes a Latin poem by Joan Albert Ban, a dedication to Jacob van Campen, and Latin quote by Albrecht Dürer, three men inspired by this painting.
