= Echelon Song =

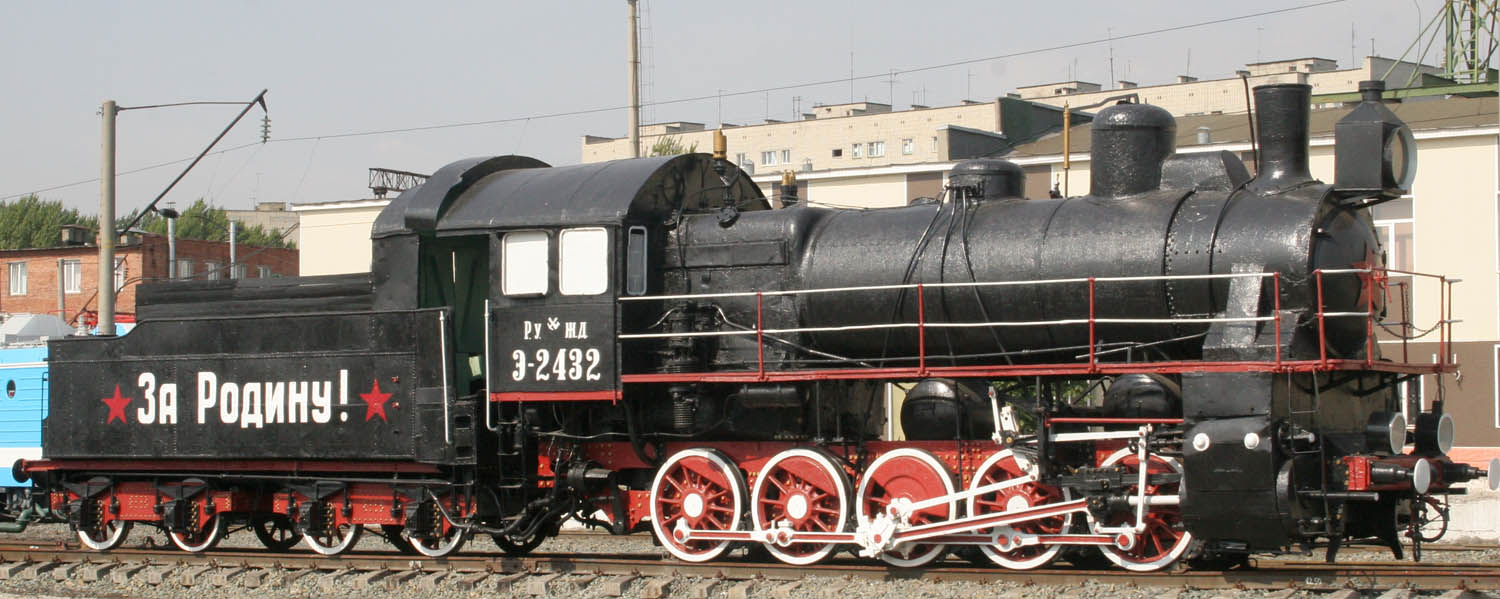
Russian Civil War era locomotive (Э-2432, built in 1915)

The Echelon Song (Russian: Эшелонная [Песня]), also known as Song for Voroshilov (Песня о Ворошилове) or Battle of the Red Guards (Боевая красногвардейская), is a Russian song written in 1933 by A. V. Alexandrov (music) and Osip Kolychev (lyrics), dedicated to Kliment Voroshilov. It is one of a number of popular Soviet songs which reminiscence about the Russian Civil War era. This particular song is about the "railway warfare" (in Russian called эшелонная война "echelon warfare") during the Battle for Tsaritsyn of 1918 (between 1925 and 1961, Tsaritsyn was known as Stalingrad and since 1962 as Volgograd), where (according to official Soviet historiography) Voroshilov and Joseph Stalin became friends. The music of the song is composed so as to recall a steam locomotive, beginning in an accelerando and crescendo, and ending in a decrescendo.

The song has been used for the closing credits of the 2016 film Hail, Caesar!
