= French art salons and academies =

From the seventeenth century to the early part of the twentieth century, artistic production in France was controlled by artistic academies which organized official exhibitions called salons. In France, academies are institutions and learned societies which monitor, foster, critique and protect French cultural production.

Academies were more institutional and more concerned with criticism and analysis than those literary gatherings today called salons which were more focused on pleasurable discourse in society, although certain gatherings around such figures as Marguerite de Valois were close to the academic spirit.

== History ==
Academies first began to appear in France in the Renaissance. In 1570 Jean-Antoine de Baïf created one devoted to music and poetry, the Académie de Poésie et de Musique, inspired by Italian models (such as the academy around Marsilio Ficino).

The first half of the seventeenth century saw a phenomenal growth in private learned academies, organized around a half-dozen or a dozen individuals meeting regularly. By the middle of the century, the number of private academies decreased as academies gradually came under government control, sponsorships and patronage.

The first private academy to become "official" and to this day the most prestigious of governmental academies is the Académie Française ("French Academy"), founded in 1634 by Cardinal Richelieu. It is concerned with the French language. In the fine arts, the Académie de Peinture et de Sculpture ("Academy of Painting and Sculpture") was founded by Cardinal Mazarin in 1648 and was soon followed by a number of other officially instituted academies: the Académie Royale de Danse ("Royal Academy of Dance") in 1661; the Académie Royale des Inscriptions et Médailles ("Royal Academy of Inscriptions and Medals") in 1663 [renamed the Académie Royale des Inscriptions et Belles-lettres ("Royal Academy of Inscriptions and Literature" or "Royal Academy of Humanities") in 1716]; the Académie Royale des Sciences ("Royal Academy of Sciences") in 1666; the Académie d'Opéra ("Academy of Opera") in 1669 [renamed the Académie Royale de Musique ("Royal Academy of Music") in 1672 and the Académie de Musique in 1791]; and the Académie Royale d'Architecture ("Royal Academy of Architecture") founded by Jean-Baptiste Colbert in 1671.

In 1793 during the French Revolution the academies were suppressed, but in 1795 the Institut national des sciences et des arts (now the Institut de France) was established and consisted of three Classes: Sciences Physiques et Mathématiques ("Physical and Mathematical Sciences"); Sciences Morales et Politiques ("Moral and Political Sciences"); and Littérature et Beaux-Arts ("Literature and Fine Arts"). In 1803 under Napoleon the name was changed to Institut National de France, and it was reorganized into four Classes: 1. Sciences Physiques et Mathématiques; 2. La Langue et Littérature Françaises ("French Literature and Language"); 3. Histoire et Littérature Anciennes ("History and Ancient Literature"); and 4. Beaux-Arts ("Fine Arts"). The Institut was renamed the Institut de France in 1806 and Institut Impérial de France in 1811.

The Institut was renamed again in 1814 under the Bourbon Restoration to Institut Royal de France, and in 1816, the older appellation of "Académie" was revived, when it was reorganized into four sections: the Académie Française; the Académie des Inscriptions et Belles-Lettres; the Académie des Sciences; and the Académie des Beaux-Arts. The last consisted of three subordinate academies, those of painting and sculpture, music, and architecture. In 1833 the earlier class, Sciences Morales et Politiques, which had been suppressed in 1803 under Napoleon, was revived as a fifth academy, the Académie des Sciences Morales et Politiques.

== French Academy in Rome ==
The Académie de peinture et sculpture is responsible for the Académie de France in the Villa Médicis in Rome (founded in 1666) which allows promising artists to study in Rome.

== Salons as exhibitions ==
From the 17th to the 20th century, the Académie de peinture et sculpture organized official art exhibitions called salons. To show at a salon, a young artist needed to be received by the Académie by first submitting an artwork to the jury; only Académie artists could be shown in the salons. Salons were started under Louis XIV and continued from 1667 to 1704. After a hiatus, the salons started up again in 1725. Under Louis XV, the most prestigious Salon took place in Paris (the Salon de Paris) in the Salon Carré of the Louvre, but there were also salons in the cities of Bordeaux, Lille and Toulouse.

In 1881, the government withdrew official sponsorship from the annual Salon, and a group of artists organized the Société des artistes français to take responsibility for the show.

In the 19th century, the salon system frequently incited criticism from artists for the bland or academic quality of the artwork, while radical artists (like Édouard Manet or Gustave Courbet) would not be received or would be greatly censored by the "respectable" public. The salon system thus forced radical and modern artists to seek alternative or unofficial exhibition sites. This is especially true for Impressionists and Fauvism.

See also:

- Salon (gathering) - the expression "salon" is also used to refer to literary gatherings
- Academic art
- Paris Salon - Main page for the official Salon de Paris
- Salon des Refusés - started in 1863
- Salon des Indépendants -started in 1884
- Salon d'Automne - started in 1903

== Other major art exhibitions in France ==
France has been the host of a number on important international fairs and exhibitions:

- The Exposition universelle de Paris — a kind of World's Fair — was held in Paris in 1889. It was for this fair that the Eiffel Tower was built (1887–1889).
- The Grand Palais and the Petit Palais were built as exhibition halls for the Exposition Universelle (1900).

Paris was also the site of two world exhibitions of decorative arts:

- The Exposition internationale des arts décoratifs et industriels modernes in 1925 launched the style called "Moderne", or "Streamline Moderne" or "Art Deco".
- The subsequent exhibition, the "Exposition Internationale des Arts et Techniques dans la Vie Moderne (1937)", in 1937 saw, to a certain degree, the last flowering of this style; the Palais de Tokyo was built for this exhibition.

Today, France is host to one of Europe's most prestigious international contemporary art fairs, the FIAC ("Foire internationale d'art contemporain"), and to Paris Photo (an international photography exhibition). Other art fairs and salons include:

- ArtParis, held in the Carrousel du Louvre (ArtParis website)
- SAGA ("Salon des Arts Graphiques Actuels"), specialized in lithography, etching and illustration
