= Guillaume Barberon =

Guillaume Barberon was a musician and minor composer of the early 17th century, active in Paris.

== Biography ==
He was only identified between 1622 and 1630: in 1622 he signed a mutual donation with his wife Marie Boittel; He was then master of the music of the house of Monseigneur Charles, Duke of Guise. On 8 December 1630 he witnessed the marriage of Pierre Bourgeois, master instrument player, residing on rue Beaubourg, with Marine Barat. He was then said to be master of the music of the duke of Épernon.

== Works ==
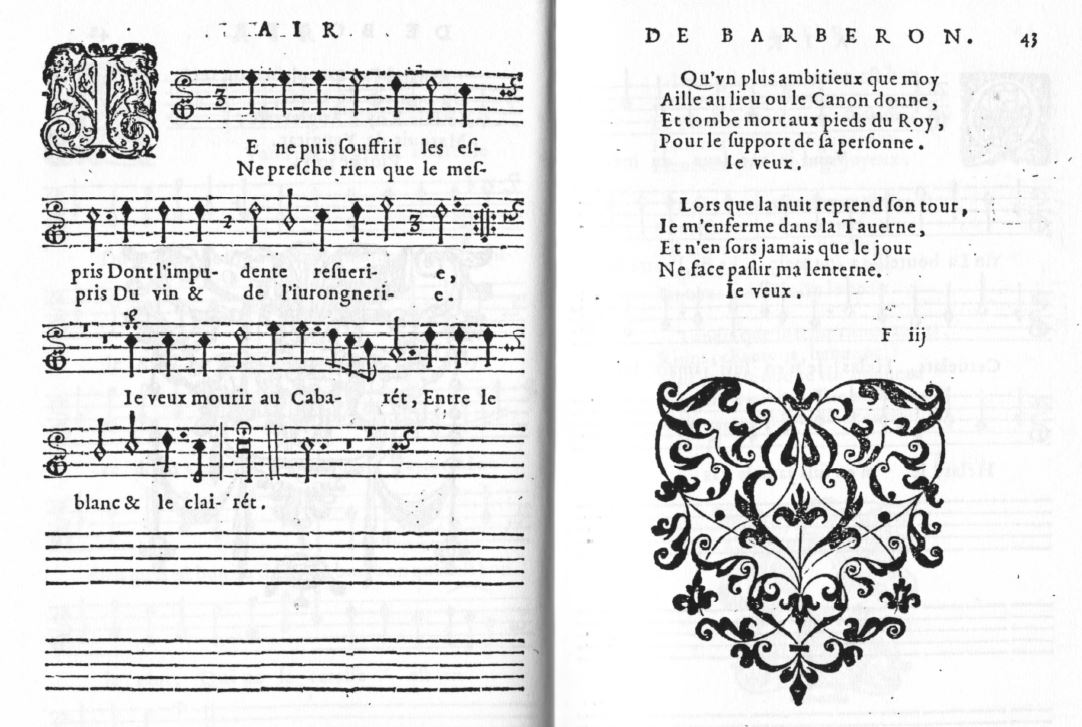
The aria Je ne puis souffrir les espris... 1626.

Only one piece of him is known: the drinking tune Je ne puis souffrir les espris... in the VIIe Livre d’airs de cour, et de différents auteurs (Paris: Pierre I Ballard, 1626. RISM 1626 exp 11, Guillo 2003 n° 1626-B). The volume was reprinted in 1628 (RISM 1628 exp 8, Guillo 2003 n° 1628-B) but then the tune was anonymous.

== Bibliography ==
- Jules Écorcheville: Actes d'état civil de musiciens insinués au Châtelet de Paris. Paris : L. M. Fortin, 1907.
- Laurent Guillo: Pierre I Ballard et Robert III Ballard, imprimeurs du roy pour la musique (1599–1673). Sprimont et Versailles : 2003. 2 vol.
- Madeleine Jurgens, Documents du minutier central concernant l’histoire de la musique, 1600–1650. 1 [études I – X]. Paris, 1967.
