= François Richard =

French composer

François Richard (ca. 1585 – 1650) was a French composer of airs de cour. His Airs de cour a quatre parties (1637) mentions the pleasure Louis XIII found in the music of his Chamber.

== Works, editions and recordings ==
- Airs de cour avec la tablature de luth 1637
- Airs de cour a quatre parties 1637
- Amarante Céline Scheen Eduardo Egüez, Flora 2010
- Ballet du Roy published in Airs de cour avec la tablature de luth - Pierre Ballard Paris 1626
