= Étienne Moulinié =

French Baroque composer (1599–1676)

Fantasia à4, VdGS No.2 for 2 Treble Viols, Tenor & Bass Viols (1639) by Étienne Moulinié
Performed by Phillip W. Serna, Treble, Tenor & Bass Viols

"Enfin la Beauté"
Air de cour by Étienne Moulinié

"Je suis ravi de mon Uranie"
Air de cour by Étienne Moulinié

Étienne Moulinié (10 October 1599 – 1676) was a French Baroque composer. He was born in Languedoc, and when he was a child he sang at the Narbonne Cathedral. Through the influence of his brother Antoine (died 1655), Moulinié gained an appointment at court, as the director of music for Gaston d'Orléans, the younger brother of King Louis XIII. For this post he wrote sacred and secular music, for voice or voices and lute or continuo. He also wrote music to accompany the ballet or other dances. He taught Gaston's daughter, Mlle de Montpensier. Moulinié worked for Gaston until the latter's death in 1660, at which point he was forced to find new employment. For this he returned to his birthplace of Languedoc.

Moulinié wrote in the genres of airs de cour and airs à boire. His airs de cour are strophic and syllabic, but generally freer than others in the genre. His works were printed in a number of different forms (for voices alone and voice with continuo), and many were changed into sacred texts for use in church, although he also wrote other pieces which were religious from the start. His work may have been influenced by music of other countries, including the dance music of Spain and Italy. His songs, and their new texts, became very well traveled, being translated into German and Dutch, one being published far away by the Prussian musician Heinrich Albert (Königsberg, 1648).
