= Michel L'Affilard =

Michel L'Affilard (c.1656-1708) was a French tenor and the writer of a notable book on singing.

== Biography ==
L'Affilard sang in the choir of Louis XIV from 1683 to 1708, with a salary of 900 livres. He also composed airs de cour.

L'Affilard's work on sight-singing, Principes trés faciles pour bien apprendre la musique, passed through seven editions (Paris, 1691; Amsterdam, 1717). In it, the tempo of the airs is regulated by Joseph Sauveur's pendulum, the precursor of the metronome. The book has become an important source on music practice of the time. A facsimile edition was produced in Geneva in 1971, ISBN 2-8266-0349-3.
