= Claude Le Jeune =

Franco-Flemish composer (1528/30 – c. 1600)

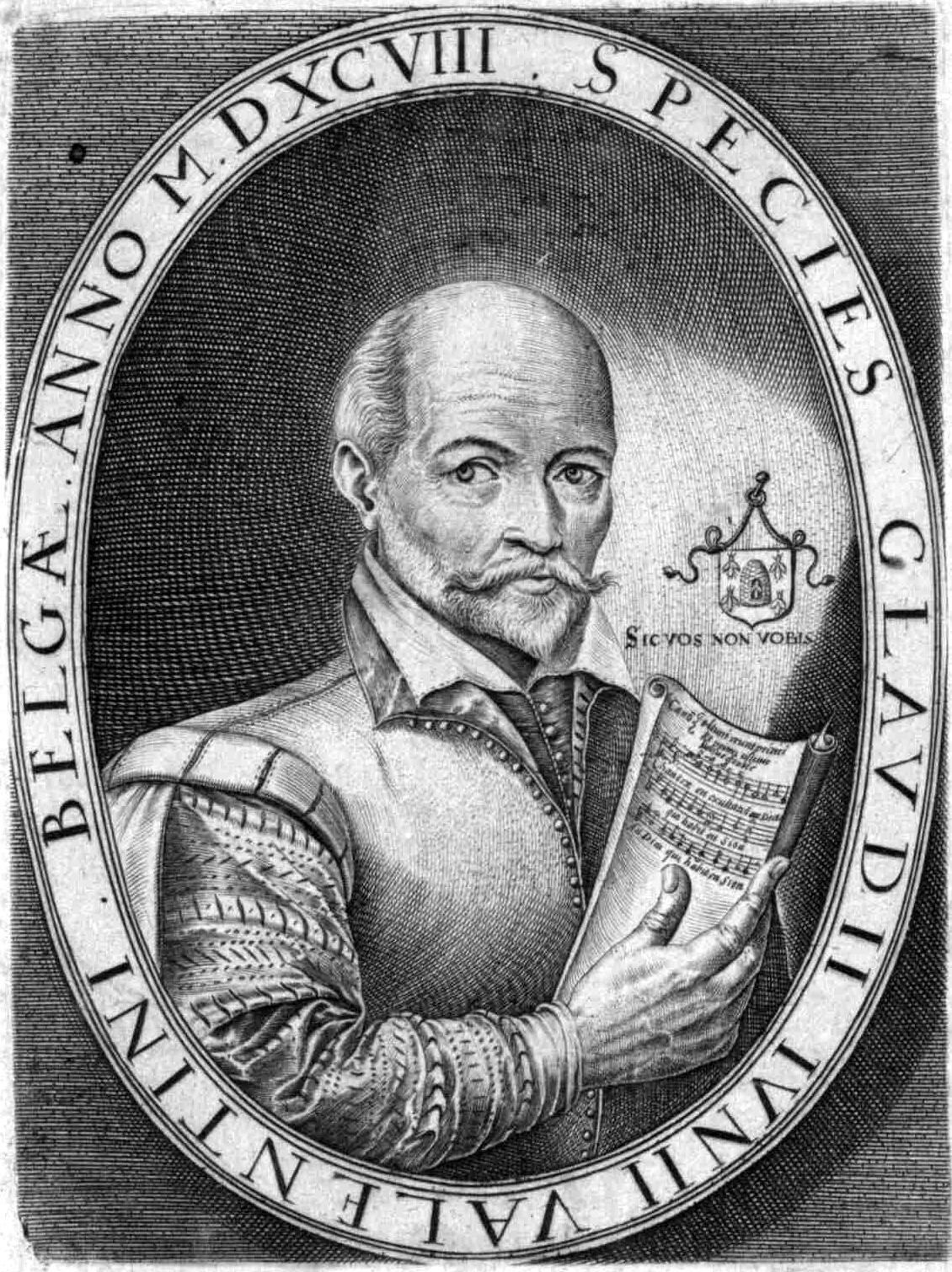
Claude Le Jeune; engraving in his Dodécacorde (1598, La Rochelle)

Claude Le Jeune (French pronunciation: [klod lə ʒœn]; 1528 to 1530 – buried 26 September 1600) was a Franco-Flemish composer of the late Renaissance. He was the primary representative of the musical movement known as musique mesurée, and a significant composer of the "Parisian" chanson, the predominant secular form in France in the latter half of the 16th century. His fame was widespread in Europe, and he ranks as one of the most influential composers of the time.

== Life ==
He was born in Valenciennes, where he probably received his early musical training. Sometime fairly early in life he became a Protestant. The first record of his musical activity is from 1552, when four chansons attributed to him were published at Leuven, in anthologies of works by several composers. In 1564, he moved to Paris, where he became acquainted with the Huguenots. By this time, he had already acquired some international fame, as evidenced by the appearance of his name in a list of "contemporary composers of excellence" in a manuscript copy of the Penitential Psalms of Orlande de Lassus, which were probably composed in the 1560s in Munich. Lassus may have met Le Jeune in the mid-1550s during a trip to France; however this has not been definitely established.

In 1570, Le Jeune began his association with the Academie de musique et de poésie, headed by Jean-Antoine de Baïf, an association which was to be decisive both on Le Jeune's music and on the direction taken by the Academie. That Baïf was a Catholic, who even wrote a sonnet extravagantly praising the St. Bartholomew's Day Massacre in 1572 (in which somewhere between 5,000 and 30,000 Protestants were murdered) appears not to have dissuaded Le Jeune from working with him, and Le Jeune continued to set his poetry, and follow the ideals of the Academie, into the 1580s. In 1581, in collaboration with Baïf, d'Aubigné and Ronsard, he wrote incidental music for the wedding of the Duke of Joyeuse and the queen's half-sister, Marie de Lorraine.

Unfortunately, Le Jeune was found out to be the author of an anti-Catholic tract in 1589, and was forced to flee Paris during the siege that year: only the intervention of his friend, the composer Jacques Mauduit, at the city's St. Denis gate saved his life and prevented the destruction of the manuscripts he carried with him (according to Marin Mersenne, who wrote extensively about both composers in his Harmonie universelle of 1637). Other Huguenot composers were not so fortunate. Claude Goudimel, a very similar composer whom Le Jeune may have known, was murdered by a Catholic mob in Lyon during the St. Bartholomew's Day massacre in late August 1572.

Next, Le Jeune settled in La Rochelle, a stronghold of the Huguenots, but sometime in the mid-1590s he must have returned to Paris, for his name appears in a list of musicians of the royal household of Henry IV both in 1596 and 1600. Few other details from late in his life are known, but he must have been composing prolifically, judging by the enormous quantity of music which remained in manuscript at his death, most of which was published in the first two decades of the 17th century. He died in Paris, and is buried in the Protestant cemetery of La Trinité.

== Music and influence ==
Le Jeune was the most famous composer of secular music in France in the late 16th century, and his preferred form was the chanson. After 1570, most of the chansons he wrote incorporated the ideas of musique mesurée, the musical analogue to the poetic movement known as vers mesurée, in which the music reflected the exact stress accents of the French language. In musique mesurée, stressed versus unstressed syllables in the text would be set in a musical ratio of 2:1, i.e. a stressed syllable could get a quarter note while an unstressed syllable could get an eighth note. Since the meter of the verse was usually flexible, the result was a musical style which is best transcribed without meter, and which sounds to the modern ear to have rapidly changing meters, for example alternating 2/8, 3/8, etc.

In opposition to the chanson style of the Netherlandish composers writing at the same time, Le Jeune's "Parisian" chansons in musique mesurée were usually light and homophonic in texture. They were sung a cappella, and were usually from three to seven voices, though sometimes he wrote for as many as eight. Probably his most famous secular work is his collection of thirty-three airs mesurés and six chansons, all to poems by Baïf, entitled Le printemps. Occasionally he wrote in a contrapuntal idiom reminiscent of the more severe style of his Netherlandish contemporaries, sometimes with a satirical intent; and in addition he sometimes used melodic intervals which were "forbidden" by current rules, such as the expressive diminished fourth; these strictures were codified by contemporary theorists such as Gioseffe Zarlino in Venice, and were well known to Le Jeune.

Le Jeune also was keenly aware of the current humanist research into ancient Greek music theory. Greek use of the modes and the three genera intrigued him, and in his music he used both the diatonic genus (a tetrachord made up of semitone, tone, and tone) and the chromatic genus (a tetrachord made up of semitone, semitone, and an augmented second). (The enharmonic genus, consisting of quarter tone, quarter tone, and major third, was rarely used in the 16th century, although Italian theorist and composer Nicola Vicentino constructed an instrument allowing it to be used in performance.) His chansons using the chromatic genus are among the most chromatic compositions prior to the madrigals of Gesualdo.

Probably Le Jeune's most famous sacred work is his Dodécacorde, a series of twelve psalm settings which he published in La Rochelle in 1598. Each of the psalms is set in a different one of the twelve modes as given by Zarlino. Some of his psalm settings are for large forces: for example he uses sixteen voices in his setting of Psalm 52. Published posthumously was a collection of all 150 psalms, Les 150 pseaumes, for four and five voices; some of these were extremely popular, and were reprinted in several European countries throughout the 17th century.

His last completed work, published in 1606, was a collection of thirty-six songs based on eight-line poems, divided into twelve groups, each of which contained three settings in each of the twelve modes. The work, Octonaires de la vanité et inconstances du monde (Eight-line Poems on the Vanity and Inconstancy of the World), based on poems by the Calvinist preacher Antoine de Chandieu, was for groups of three or four voices. According to Le Jeune's sister Cecile, who wrote the introduction to the publication, he had intended to complete another set for more voices but died before finishing it. It was one of the last collections of chansons of the Renaissance, of any type; following its publication, the air de cour was the predominant genre of secular song composition in France.

Of Le Jeune's sacred music, a total of 347 psalm settings, thirty-eight sacred chansons, eleven motets, and a mass setting have survived. His secular output included 146 airs, most of which were in the style of musique mesurée, as well as sixty-six chansons, and forty-three Italian madrigals. In addition, three instrumental fantasias were published posthumously in 1612, as well as some works for lute. He was fortunate in that his copious manuscripts were published after his death: his friend, the equally gifted and prolific composer Jacques Mauduit, was fated to have most of his music lost.

Contemporary critics accused Le Jeune of violating some of the rules of good melodic writing and counterpoint, for example using the melodic interval of the major sixth (something Palestrina would never have done), and frequently crossing voices; some of these compositional devices were to become features of the Baroque style, premonitions of which were beginning to appear even in France towards the end of the 16th century.

== Selected recordings ==
"Revecy venir du printemps"
The chorus and beginning of the verse, an example of musique mesurée.

- Missa ad Placitum. Benedicite Dominum. Tristia obsedit me. Magnificat. Ensemble Clément Janequin, dir. Visse (HMC 901607)

Psalms

- Dix Psaumes de David (1564) 10 of 10 psalms. Ludus modalis, dir. Bruno Boterf. Ramée 2011
- Dodécacorde (1598) – 7 of 12 psalms. Ensemble Vocale Sagittarius, dir. Michel Laplénie. Accord 2003
- Psalms – Muze honorons l’illustre et grand Henry inc. Dieu nous te loüons (French Te Deum from Pseaumes en vers mesurez) Les Pages & Les Chantres, dir. Schneebeli (Alpha) 2002
- Airs et psaumes mesurés à l'antique. Claudine Ansermet soprano, Paolo Cherici, lute (Symphonia)
- Psaumes de la Réforme de Clément Marot et Théodore de Bèze Trio Viva Lux, dir. Houette (SM)

Secular works

- Le printemps – 12 of 39 chansons Huelgas Ensemble Paul Van Nevel (Sony)
- Le printemps – 39 of 39 chansons (2CD), Feuille (Arion)
- Meslanges et fantasies de violes Ensemble Clément Janequin & Ensemble Les Éléments 1995 (HMC)
- Octonaires de la vanité du monde 2CD Ensemble Jacques Feuille 1973 (Arion)
- Les saisons. 6 Octonaires. La bataille. (on Inconstance et vanité 1601) Anne Quentin (Astree)
- Chansons – Autant qu’emport le vent Ensemble Clément Janequin (HM)
