= Pierre Guédron =

French singer and composer

Pierre Guédron (c. 1570 in Châteaudun – c. 1620 in Paris), was a French singer and composer.

Guédron's Est-ce Mars (1613) was especially popular and is known in versions by Sweelinck (keyboard), Scheidt (5 part strings) and Vallet (4 lutes of different sizes).

== Works ==
- 6 books of Airs de cour à quatre et cinq parties
- Airs de différents autheurs mis en tablature de luth
- 1602: Ballet sur la Naissance de Monseigneur le duc de Vendosme
- 1610: Ballet de Monseigneur le duc de Vendosme oder Ballet d'Alcine
- 1613: Ballet de Madame
- 1614: Ballet des Argonautes
- 1615: Ballet du Triomphe de Minerve
- 1615: Ballet de Monsieur le Prince
- 1617: Ballet du Roy ou Ballet de la Délivrance de Renaud
- 1618: Ballet des Princes
- 1619: Ballet du Roy sur L'Adventure de Tancrède en la forest enchantée

== Editions available ==
- There is a large CNRS library edition of Air de cour.
- Garland published a facsimile of the original print which is now out of print.
