= Air de cour =

Secular vocal music in France in the late Renaissance and early Baroque period

The air de cour was a popular type of secular vocal music in France in the late Renaissance and early Baroque period, from about 1570 until around 1650. From approximately 1610 to 1635, during the reign of Louis XIII, this was the predominant form of secular vocal composition in France, especially in the royal court.

== Features ==
The first use of the term air de cour was in Adrian Le Roy's Airs de cour miz sur le luth (Book on Court Tunes for the Luth), a collection of music published in 1571. The earliest examples of the form are for solo voice accompanied by lute; towards the end of the 16th century, four or five voices are common, sometimes accompanied (or instrumental accompaniment may have been optional); and by the mid-17th century, most airs de cour were again for solo voice with accompaniment. Beginning in 1608, airs de cour were often taken from ballets de cour, a form of ballet which was quickly becoming popular at the French court.

Musically they were strophic, i.e. successive verses of the text were set with similar music. While the earlier music, especially that for multiple voices, was polyphonic, after about 1610 the music usually was homophonic, sung syllabically and without meter, with a clear influence from the musique mesurée which developed in Paris around 1570. Collections exist which deviate considerably from these trends, however; several printers specialized in polyphonic airs de cour throughout the early 17th century, and there are eight volumes published by Le Roy & Ballard which are monophonic – for a single voice with no accompaniment.

Airs de cour show surprisingly little influence from the Italian early Baroque trends of monody and the madrigal, either in its polyphonic or its concertato form. This is all the more surprising as Italian musicians often worked in France, and the polyphonic and concertato forms of madrigal were being deeply influential in Germany at the same time. Emotional expression in the airs de cour, compared to that of the contemporary Italian madrigalists, is cool, classical and reserved, in keeping with contemporary French taste. Vocal range of the music is usually limited to one octave; dissonance and chromaticism are rare; and the overall simplicity of expression is striking.

The influence of the air de cour extended beyond France. Collections were published in Germany, and more importantly in England, where translations were rather popular, as attested by the several publications and copies. There exists a delightfully titled publication: French Court-airs, with their Ditties Englished, (Edward Filmer, 1629). The air de cour had considerable influence on the development of the English ayre.

The atmosphere of these songs is very different from the English lute song, and the lute technique employs some novel features. There are notated strummings with the 1st finger, both up and down. There have been several articles on the finer points of this, as well as the exact meaning of the notation, in the English and French Lute Society Journals.

== Composers ==
Composers of airs de cour included:

- Adrian Le Roy (c.1520 – 1598)
- Nicolas de La Grotte (1530 – c.1600)
- Charles Tessier (ca.1550 – after 1604)
- Jacques Mauduit (1557 – 1627)
- Pierre Guédron (c.1570 – c.1620)
- François Richard (c.1585 – 1650)
- Antoine Boësset (1586 – 1643)
- Étienne Moulinié (c.1600 – c.1669)
- Jean de Cambefort (c.1605 – 1661)
- Jacques de Gouy (c.1610 – after 1650)
- Bénigne de Bacilly (c.1625–1690)
- Joseph Chabanceau de La Barre (1633–1678)
- Gabriel Bataille (c.1575 – 1630)
- Michel L'Affilard (c.1656 – 1708)
- Jean-Baptiste Drouard de Bousset (1662–1725)

== Media ==
"Enfin la Beauté"
Air de cour by Étienne Moulinié

"Je suis ravi de mon Uranie"
Air de cour by Étienne Moulinié

== Discography ==
- Etienne Moulinie: Airs with lute tablature First Book (Musica Viva B000003XT6)
- Etienne Moulinié, Airs de Cour (L'empreinte digitale, ed 13010)
- Airs de Cour, La dispute des bergers/La pierre philosophale Les Arts Florissants/William Christie (Erato 3984-25485-2)
- Airs de Cour Orinda: French renaissance songs, featuring Jennifer Lane can be listened to online (free and legally!) at this site
- Antoine Boesset: Air Qui Produit Tant Des Choses : Boesset by Monique Zanetti, Ensemble A Deux Violes Esgales
- Amour Cruel: airs by Michel Lambert et Sebastien Le Camus / Suzie LeBlanc, Stephen Stubbs, Les Voix Humaines (ATMA ACD2 2216)
- Cœur, airs de cour français de la fin du XVIe siècle, Vincent Dumestre, Le Poème Harmonique, (Alpha 213)

== See also ==
- Didier Le Blanc
- Villanella

== References and further reading ==
- John H. Baron, "Air de cour", in The New Grove Dictionary of Music and Musicians, ed. Stanley Sadie. 20 vol. London, Macmillan Publishers Ltd., 1980. ISBN 1-56159-174-2
- Gustave Reese, Music in the Renaissance. New York, W.W. Norton & Co., 1954. ISBN 0-393-09530-4
- Manfred Bukofzer, Music in the Baroque Era. New York, W.W. Norton & Co., 1947. ISBN 0-393-09745-5
- Harold Gleason and Warren Becker, Music in the Middle Ages and Renaissance (Music Literature Outlines Series I). Bloomington, Indiana. Frangipani Press, 1986. ISBN 0-89917-034-X
- Jeanice Brooks, Courtly Song in Late Sixteenth-Century France. Chicago, The University of Chicago Press, 2000. ISBN 0-226-07587-7
- The primary sources were published by the royal publishers Le Roy and Ballard. Garland has published many of them in facsimile in modern times.
- George J. Buelow A history of baroque music Indiana University Press, 2004 pp. 156–158 ISBN 0-253-34365-8
- Diana Maury Robin; Anne R. Larsen, Carole Levin, ABC-CLIO, 2007 ISBN 1-85109-772-4
