= Antoine Boësset =

French composer (1586–1643)

Antoine Boësset (Note: Boësset's name is also spelled as Antoine Boesset and Anthoine de Boesset) (1586 – 8 December 1643) was a French composer of Baroque music, known particularly for airs de cour. As superintendent of music at the Ancien Régime, he and his father-in-law Pierre Guédron dominated the court's musical life for the first half of the 17th century under Louis XIII.

== Life and career ==
Born at Blois and baptised there on 24 February 1587, he was made master of the children within the musical household of the Chambre du roi in 1613. He rose to be the queen's music master in 1617 and secretary to the Chambre du roi in 1620, and finally surintendant of the musical household of the Chambre du roi in 1623 – in the last of these roles he succeeded Guédron (surintendant under Henry IV and Louis XIII), whose daughter he married in 1613. In 1632 he was conseiller and maître d'hôtel ordinaire du roi. He then held all these posts simultaneously until his death.

At the court he got to know Descartes, Mersenne and Huygens. Around 1640 Mersenne arranged a contest between Boësset and the Dutch Catholic priest Joan Albert Ban to set Germain Habert's poem "Me veux-tu voir mourir", but altered the poem's first line and thus its sense in the copy sent to Boësset – this influenced the setting and allowed Boësset to easily win the competition (Mersenne had already criticised Ban's work as boring and trivial). Boësset was also one of the forerunners of the basso continuo in France. He died in Paris in 1643.

== Works ==
- 9 Livres d'airs de cour (Books of airs de cour) for 4 and 5 voices (1617–1642; republished 1689)
- Dozens of airs de cour for voice and lute (in anthologies published by Ballard)
- Many ballets (1614-1639)
- 3 masses, 5 motets and a Magnificat

A critical edition of the airs de cour is being prepared by the Centre de Musique Baroque de Versailles (http://www.cmbv.com).
