= Jean-Antoine de Baïf =

French poet (1532–1589)

Jean Antoine de Baïf
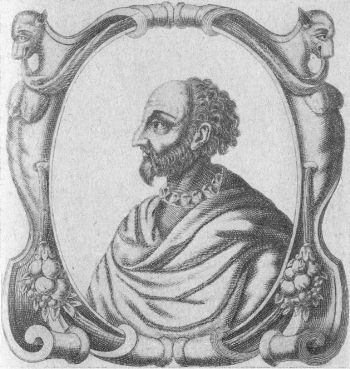
- Born: 19 February 1532; Venice
- Died: 19 September 1589 (aged 57); Paris
- Occupation: Poet

Jean Antoine de Baïf (French: [ʒɑ̃ ɑ̃twan də baif]; 19 February 1532 – 19 September 1589) was a French poet and member of the Pléiade.

== Life ==
Jean Antoine de Baïf was born in Venice, the natural son of the scholar Lazare de Baïf, who was at that time French ambassador at Venice. He grew up an enthusiast for the fine arts. His father spared no pains to secure the best possible education for his son. The boy was taught Latin by Charles Estienne, and Greek by Ange Vergèce, the Cretan scholar and calligraphist who designed Greek types for Francis I.

When he was eleven years old, he was put under the care of the famous Jean Daurat. Ronsard, who was eight years his senior, now began to share his studies. Claude Binet tells how young Baïf, familiar with Latin and Greek, smoothed out the tiresome beginnings of the Greek language for Ronsard, who in return initiated his companion into the mysteries of French versification.

Baïf was incredibly prolific, which harmed his reputation. Besides a number of volumes of short poems of an amorous or congratulatory kind, he translated or paraphrased various pieces from Bion of Smyrna, Moschus, Theocritus, Anacreon, Catullus and Martial. He resided in Paris, and enjoyed the continued favor of the court. In 1570, in conjunction with the composer Joachim Thibault de Courville, with royal blessing and financial backing, he founded the Académie de Poésie et de Musique, with the idea of establishing a closer union between music and poetry; his house became famous for the concerts which he gave, entertainments which Charles IX and Henry III frequently attended. Composers such as Claude Le Jeune, who was to become the most influential musician in France in the late 16th century, and Jacques Mauduit, who carried the Academie's ideas into the 17th century, soon joined the group, which remained secretive as to its intents and techniques.

== Works ==
Baïf elaborated a system for regulating French versification by quantity, a system which came to be known as vers mesurés, or vers mesurés à l'antique. In the general idea of regulating versification by quantity, he was not a pioneer. Jacques de la Taille had written in 1562 the Maniére de faire des vers en français comme en grec et en latin (printed 1573), and other poets had made experiments in the same direction; however, in his specific attempt to recapture the ancient Greek and Latin ethical effect of poetry on its hearers, and in applying the metrical innovations to music, he created something entirely new.

Baïf's innovations also included a line of 15 syllables known as the vers Baïfin. He also meditated reforms in French spelling.

His theories are exemplified in Etrenes de poezie Franzoeze an vers mezures (1574). His works were published in 4 volumes, entitled Œuvres en rime (1573), consisting of Amours, Jeux, Passetemps, et Poemes, containing, among much that is now hardly readable, some pieces of infinite grace and delicacy. His sonnet on the Roman de la Rose was said to contain the whole argument of that celebrated work, and Colletet says it was on everybody's lips. He held the historian of the French language Claude Fauchet in high regard; in a neo-Latin poem addressed to Fauchet, Baïf called him 'Falcete docte, carminum ô tu candide / Iudex meorum' ('Learned Fauchet, candid judge of my poems').

He also wrote a celebrated sonnet in praise of the St. Bartholomew's Day Massacre. Baïf was the author of two comedies, L'Eunuque, 1565 (published 1573), a free translation of Terence's Eunuchus, and Le Brave (1567), an imitation of the Miles Gloriosus, in which the characters of Plautus are turned into Frenchmen, the action taking place at Orléans. Baïf published a collection of Latin verse in 1577, and in 1576 a popular volume of Mimes, enseignemens et proverbes.

Twentieth century French composer Denise Roger used Baïf's text in some of her songs.
