= Eugène Godard =

French aeronaut

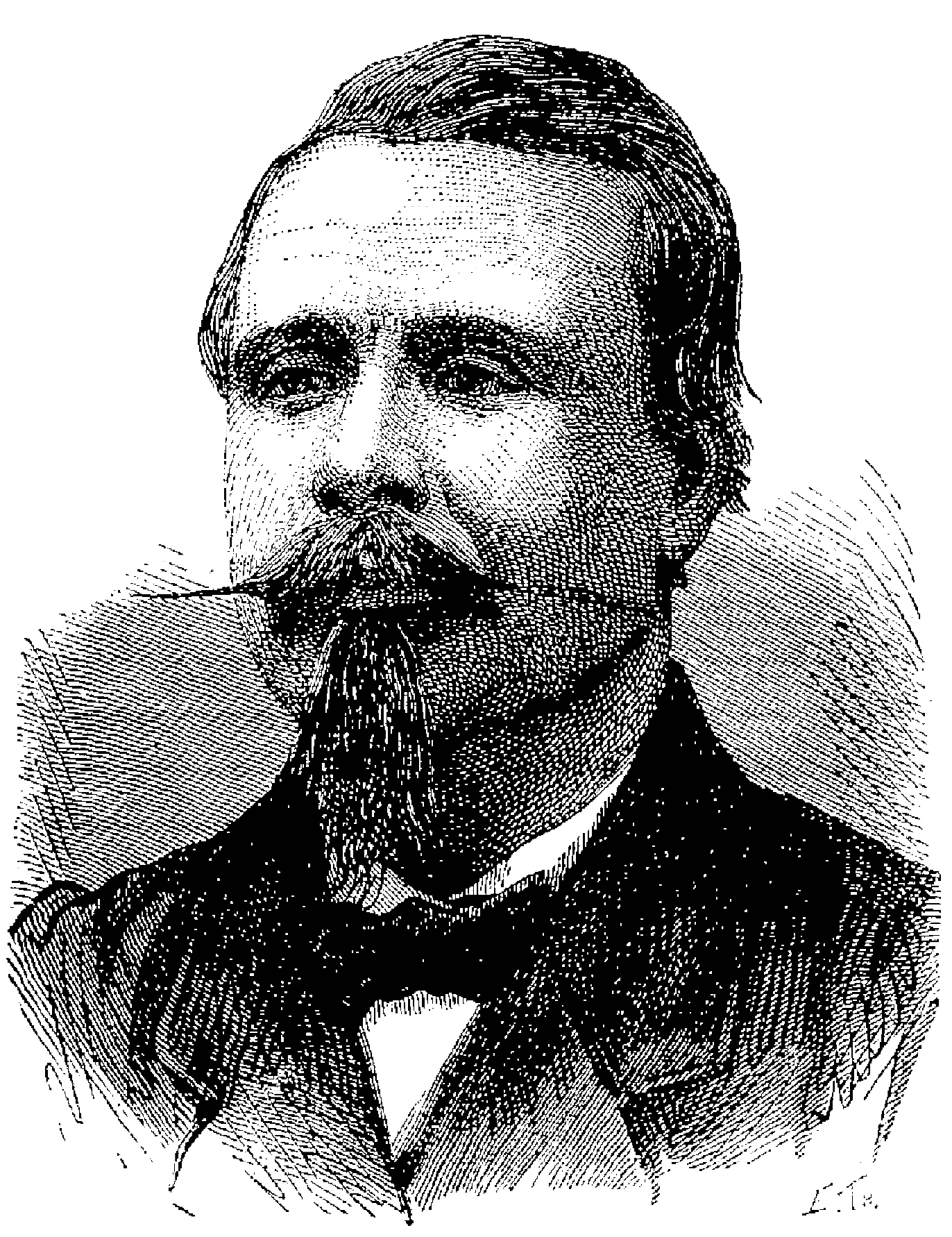
- Godard in 1868 by Louis Figuier
- Born: Eugène Godard Ainé; 26 August 1827; Clichy, France
- Died: 9 September 1890 (aged 63); Brussels, Belgium
- Resting place: Saint-Ouen Cemetery, Paris. 48.910335°N 2.350047°E
- Known for: Pioneering constructor of gas and hot air balloons Innovator of battlefield aerial reconnaissance Organizer of the first aeronautics competition in France
- Awards: Aeronaut of the Emperor of Austria; Aeronaut of the Emperor of France
- Aviation career
- First flight: 17 October 1847
- Famous flights: First balloon flight in Wales; First hot air balloon flight in London; First passenger balloon flight in Canada

Eugène Godard Ainé (26 August 1827 – 9 September 1890) was a French aeronaut.

== Biography ==
In 1841, 14-year-old Eugène Godard enrolled at the National Conservatory of Arts and Crafts in Paris. He did well in his studies and, being the son of a master mason, was intent on a career in architecture. After attending the launch of a gas balloon in 1845 however, he found his passion had a new direction and began building balloons. Although his first craft never managed to leave the ground, Godard persisted, and by the end of 1846 he had designed, built, and successfully launched several unmanned hydrogen balloons. He and his brother Louis established a workshop in Lille where the two constructed the balloon in which, on 17 October 1847, Eugène made his first free ascent, initiating his career as professional aeronaut and aerostat manufacturer.

In 1849, Godard went to Bordeaux and met the famous British balloonist Charles Green, who flew him aboard a balloon inflated with coal gas, which was cheaper and more easily obtained than hydrogen. Applying what he learned from Green, Godard constructed his next craft, which he named the Ville de Bordeaux.

On 6 October 1850 Godard made his first long-distance flight from the hippodrome at Place de l'Etoile in Paris to Gits, Belgium aboard his balloon the Ville de París, a craft that observers described as a "noble and gigantic" balloon. The Ville de París was reportedly destroyed by fire about a month later following a mishap in Marseille where Godard and four passengers lost control of the balloon. Fortunately all five people survived.

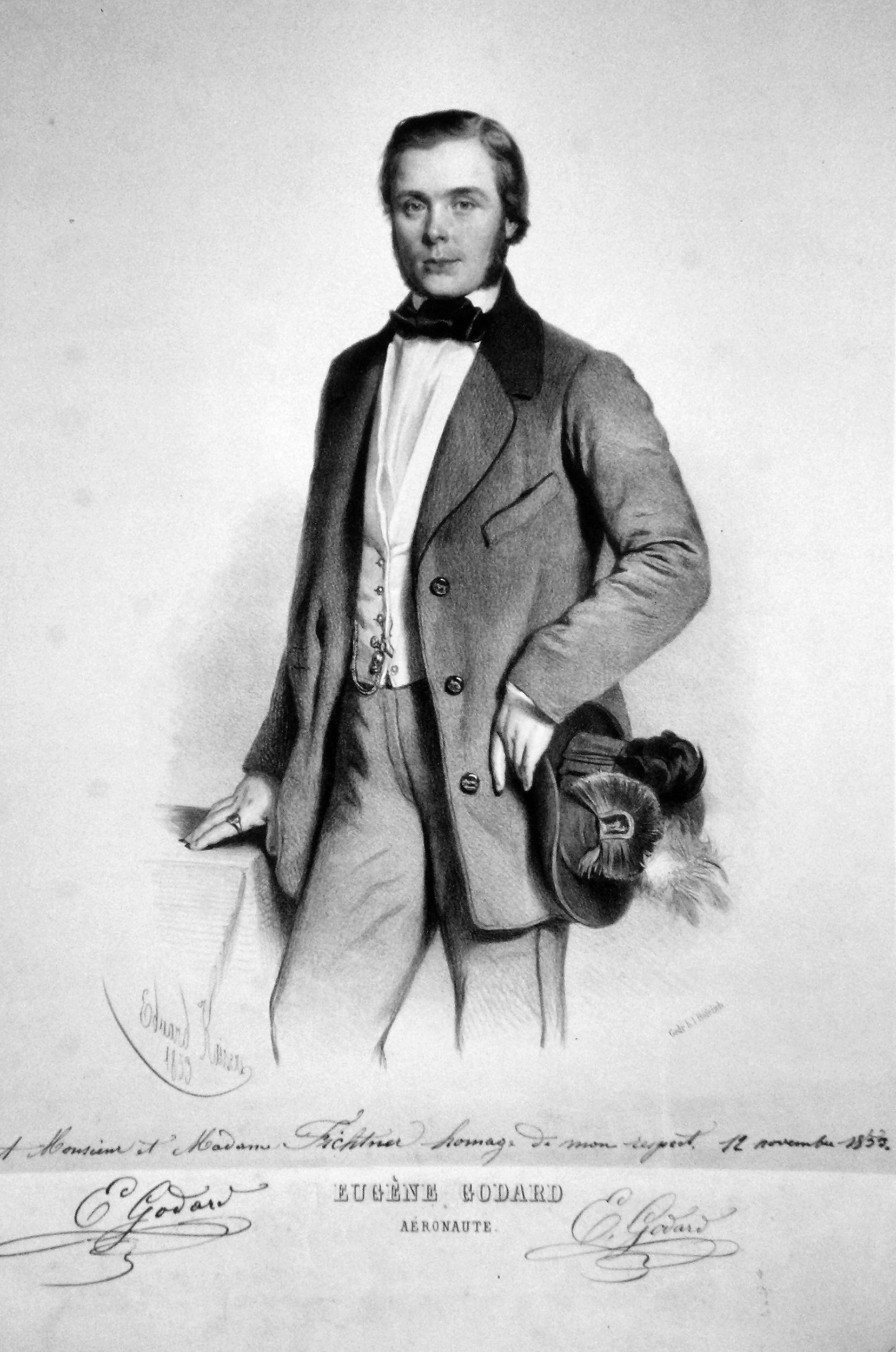
An 1851 lithograph of Eugène Godard

In 1852 Godard aided inventor Henri Giffard in constructing the first steam airship. In 1853, launching from Vienna, Godard became only the second person to ever fly over the Austrian Alps.

In 1854 Godard made a series of ascents at the marriage of Emperor Franz Joseph I and Empress Elizabeth of Austria. On that occasion Godard signed an agreement with the Austrian government which stated that, in case of war, he would build balloons, organize balloonists companies, and perform observation ascents for the military. Franz Joseph declared him the "Aeronaut of the Emperor of Austria".

In August 1855, he left France with his wife and his brother Auguste and went to the United States, where he remained until 1858. Godard's many balloon ascents in North America included launches in New York City, New Orleans, St. Louis, Louisville, Cincinnati, San Francisco, and Cuba. After a perilous ascent aboard the balloon American during a storm in Cincinnati, Godard invented the tear panel which facilitates rapid deflation of a balloon.

In 1856, Godard traveled to Cuba where he met canopy maker Matías Pérez. The two shared a flight on 21 May, after which Perez purchased the balloon from Godard for 1200 hard pesos. According to one report, this craft had also been named Ville de París. Perez flew the ship himself successfully on 12 June under excellent atmospheric conditions. Then on 29 June, at around 7:00 PM, the Cuban attempted a second ascent, but this time in a strong wind. The balloon was quickly swept out to sea with Perez on board. The balloon and pilot were never found.

On 8 September 1856, Eugène Godard made the first successful Canadian passenger flight in a balloon, travelling from Montreal to Pointe-Olivier, Quebec. On board with him were A.E. Kierzowski and A.X. Rambau. The balloon, called Canada, was the first aircraft ever constructed in Canada. Then on 13 August 1857, Godard made the first balloon flight in the history of Wales, launching from Caernarfon in a gas balloon called Aurora.

In 1859, at the outbreak of the Franco-Austrian war, Godard returned to Europe and offered tethered observation balloon services to Emperor Napoleon III. In so doing, he instituted the art of aerial reconnaissance and broke the 1854 agreement he had made with Franz Joseph I, contributing to Austria's defeat by the French.

After the war, Godard began building hot air balloons equipped with a boiler of his invention, known as the "Montgodarfières". In 1863 he was again awarded the title "Aeronaut of the Emperor", but this time by Napoleon III. He was commissioned to build a balloon to be used as a platform for aerial photography by renowned photographer Nadar. The aircraft, which was called Le Géant (The Giant), had an onboard darkroom, a two-story deck capable of carrying 50 men, and an envelope capacity of 6,000 m^{3} (210,000 ft^{3}). It was this balloon that inspired Jules Verne to write his adventure novel, Five Weeks in a Balloon. Later that year Godard built an even larger craft, L'Aigle (The Eagle), whose furnace weighed 445 kilograms (980 pounds) and had a volume that dwarfed that of Le Géant with 14,000 m^{3} (490,000 ft^{3}).

On 20 July 1864 Godard achieved the first hot-air balloon ascent from London, launching L'Aigle from Cremorne Gardens, and eventually landing in Greenwich. He launched a second time from the same spot 8 days later, this time landing in Walthamstow.

In 1866, Godard invented a new optical telegraph system for the military. In 1867, he conducted a series of scientific ascents with astronomer Camille Flammarion.

In 1870, during the Franco-Prussian War Godard conducted captive observation flights around the city. The Provisional Government of National Defense also appointed him to construct balloons for an aerial postal service. Using workspace in both the Austerlitz and East railway stations, with the help of his wife and his brother Jules, Godard built 33 balloons from October 1870 to January 1871. Then following the Siege of Paris, he moved his family to Nantes.

While visiting Amiens on 28 September 1873, Godard and his son Eugène II piloted Jules Verne on his first and only balloon ascent.

At the 1878 Paris Expo, Godard worked with Henri Giffard offering rides to the public in his giant tethered passenger balloon at the Tuileries Garden. The gondola accommodated up to 52 passengers, and over the course of the expo, rides were given to some 35,000 people.

In 1884 Godard oversaw operation of the largest captive balloon in Nice, built at Grands Ateliers Aérostatiques du Champ-de-Mars, the largest aircraft factory of the late 19th century, by his nephew Louis II, Gabriel Yon, and 22-year-old apprentice Edouard Surcouf, who would go on to become a prominent aeronautical engineer.

On 6 April 1885 at Place Saint-Ambroise in Paris, Godard organized and directed the Arènes du Sport Aéronautique, France's first ever aviation competition.

In 1888 he settled permanently in Brussels, where he died on 9 September 1890. He is buried in Saint-Ouen Cemetery in Paris.

During his long and productive career, from 1845 to 1890, Eugène Godard built dozens of hot air and gas balloons. He performed approximately 2,500 ascents in ten countries on two continents (Europe and America) setting several world records for altitude, distance, and duration of flight.

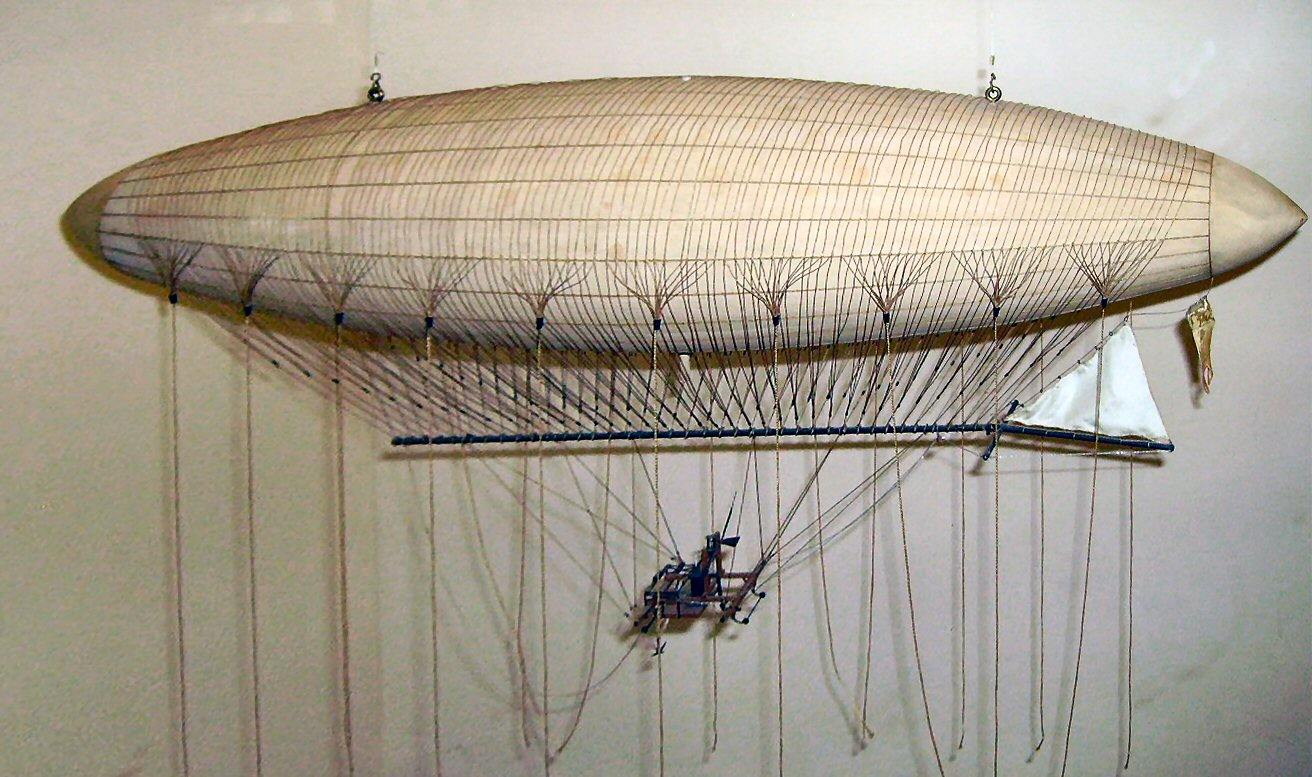
A model of the first dirigible, the 1852 steam powered Giffard Airship, on display at the London Science Museum

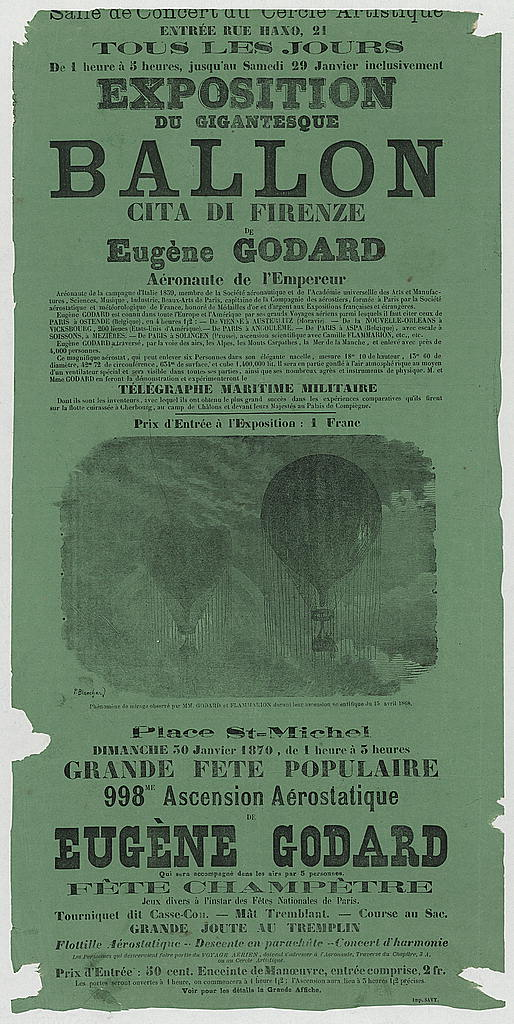
Poster for Exposition of the balloon
Cita di Fireze
at Place Saint-Michel in Paris, January 29, 1870

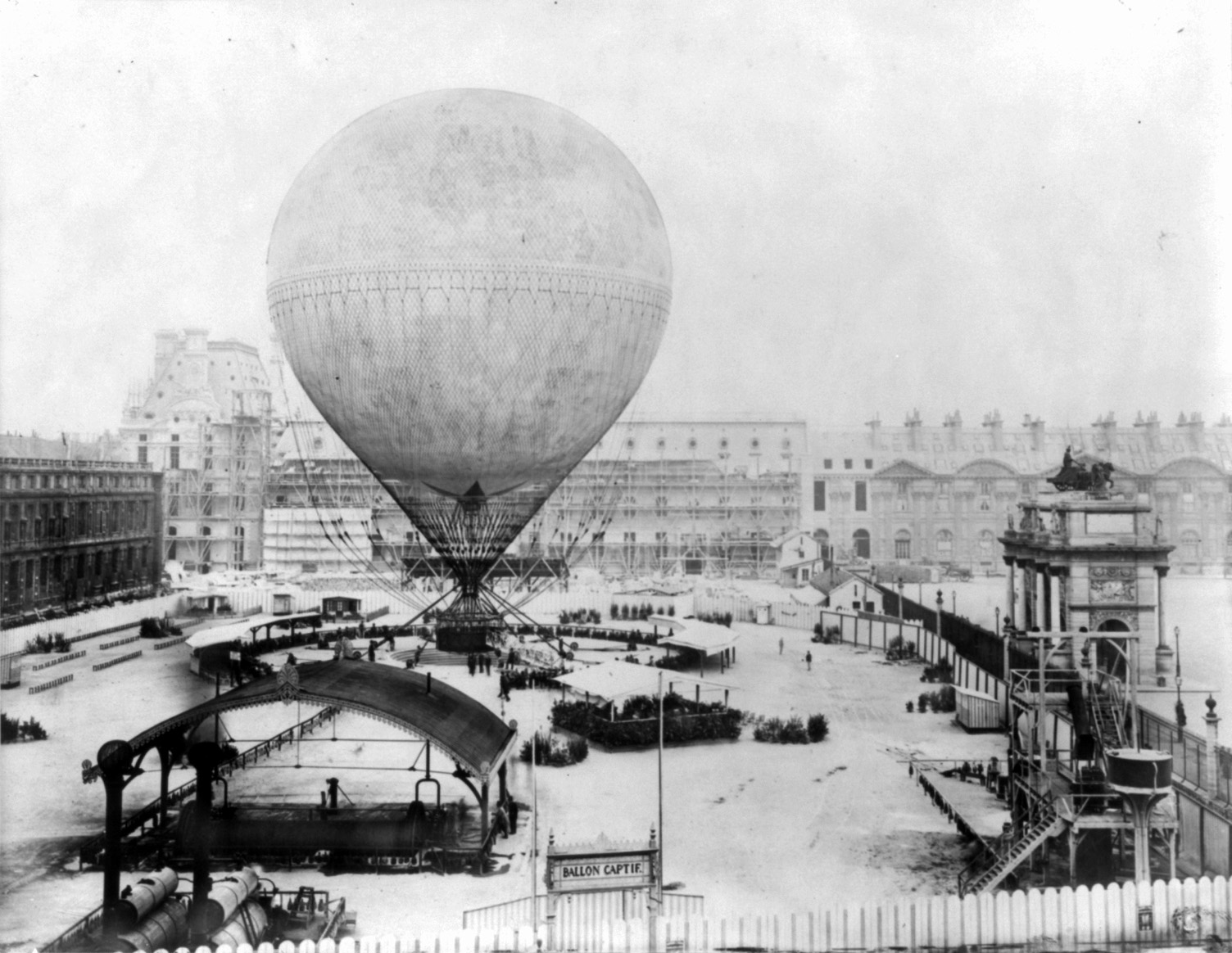
Henri Giffard's tethered passenger balloon prior to an ascent from Tuilerie Garden in 1878

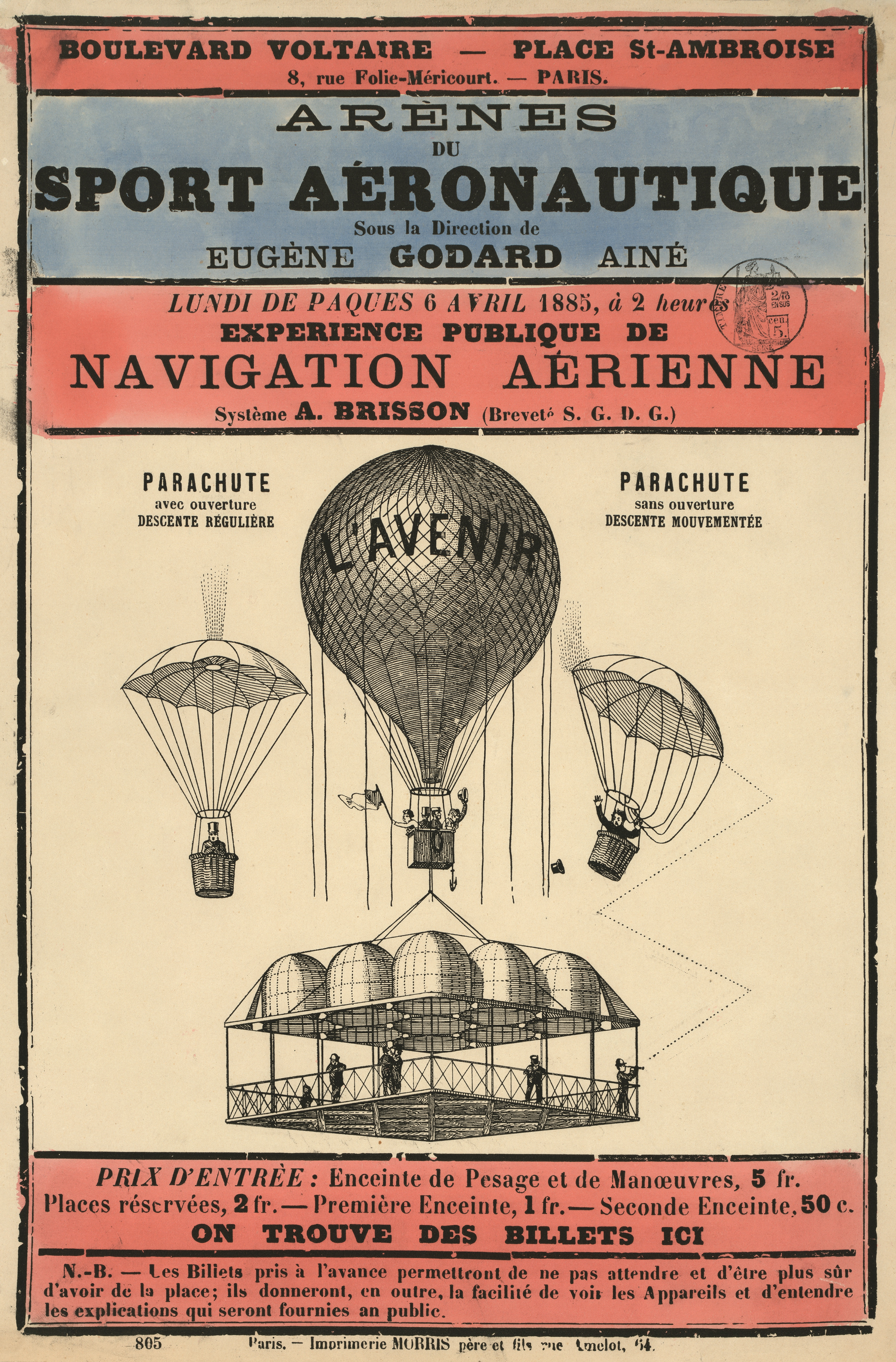
Poster for Godard's Arènes du Sport Aéronautique, held in Paris on April 6, 1885
