= Clément Janequin =

French composer (c1485-1558)

Clément Janequin (c. 1485 – 1558) was a French composer of the Renaissance. He was one of the most famous composers of popular chansons of the entire Renaissance, and along with Claudin de Sermisy, was hugely influential in the development of the Parisian chanson, especially the programmatic type. The wide spread of his fame was made possible by the concurrent development of music printing.

== Life ==
Janequin was born in Châtellerault, near Poitiers, though no documents survive which establish any details of his early life or training. His career was highly unusual for his time, in that he never had a regular position with a cathedral or an aristocratic court. Instead he held a series of minor positions, often with important patronage. In 1505 he was employed as a clerk in Bordeaux, to Lancelot du Fau, who eventually became Bishop of Luçon; he retained this position until du Fau's death in 1523, at which time he took a position with the Bishop of Bordeaux. Around this time he became a priest, though his appointments were rarely lucrative; indeed he always complained about money.

After 1530 Janequin held a succession of posts in Anjou, beginning as a singing teacher to the choirboys at the cathedral at Auch, and progressing to maître de chapelle at the singing school at Angers Cathedral. Around this time he attracted the attention of Jean de Guise, the patron of Erasmus, Clément Marot, and Rabelais; it was a welcome career boost, and, in 1548, with the additional assistance of Charles de Ronsard (the brother of poet Pierre de Ronsard), he became curate at Unverre, not far from Chartres. During this time he lived in Paris. By 1555 he was listed as a "singer ordinary" of the king's chapel, and shortly thereafter became "composer ordinary" to the king: only one composer (Sandrin, also known as Pierre Regnault) had previously had this title. In his will, dated January 1558, he left a small estate to charity, and he complained again of age and poverty in a dedication to a work published posthumously in 1559. He died in Paris.

== Music and influence ==
Few composers of the Renaissance were more popular in their lifetimes than Janequin. His chansons were well-loved and widely sung. The Paris printer Pierre Attaingnant printed five volumes with his chansons. La bataille, which vividly depicts the sounds and activity of a battle, is a perennial favorite of a cappella singing groups even in the present day.

Janequin wrote very little liturgical music: only two masses and a single motet are attributed to him, though more may have been lost. His 250 secular chansons and his (over 80) psalm settings and chansons spirituelles — the French equivalent of the Italian madrigale spirituale — were his primary legacy.

The programmatic chansons for which Janequin is famous were long, sectional pieces, and usually cleverly imitated natural or man-made sounds. Le chant des oiseaux imitates bird-calls; La chasse the sounds of a hunt; and La bataille (Escoutez tous gentilz), probably the most famous, and almost certainly written to celebrate the French victory over the Swiss Confederates at the Battle of Marignano in 1515, imitates battle noises, including trumpet calls, cannon fire and the cries of the wounded. Onomatopoeic effects such as these became commonplace in later 16th century music, and carried over into the Baroque era; indeed "battle music" was to become a cliché, but it first came into prominence with Janequin.

In addition to the programmatic chansons for which he is most famous, he also wrote short and refined compositions more in the style of Claudin de Sermisy. For these he set texts by some of the prominent poets of the time, including Clément Marot. Late in his life, he wrote the Psalm settings based on Genevan tunes. Since there is no documentary evidence, the question of whether he sympathized with the Protestants remains unanswered.

French composer Jehan Alain composed, as a tribute, a set of variations for organ on a theme attributed to Janequin (Variations sur un thème de Clément Janequin, 1937); although later scholarship has identified that particular piece as being an anonymous love song from a 1529 collection by Pierre Attaignant.

== List of works ==
=== Manuscripts ===
- 2 chansons in ms. 125-123, Bibliothèque Municipale, Cambrai, France
- 3 chansons in ms. 204; 1508; 1516, Bayerische Staatsbibliothek, Munich, Germany
- La Bataille in the archives of Puebla Cathedral, Puebla, Mexico
- A chanson in ms. 74 H. 7, Koninklijke Bibliotheek, The Hague, Netherlands
- 3 chansons in ms. Ashb. 1058 Biblioteca Laurenziana, Florence (The part of the tenor is in ms. Cons. Rés. 255, Bibliothèque nationale de France, Paris)
- 5 chansons in ms. Bourdeney-Pasche, Bibliothèque nationale de France, Paris, vers 1605
- 2 chansons in Ms. A. R. 940/41, Proske-Bibliothek, Regensburg, Germany

=== Historical publications ===
- c. 1528
  - Chansons de maistre C. Janequin nouvellement et correctement imprimeez. Attaingnant, Paris sd. [c.1528] [Chant des oiseaux, La Guerre, La Chasse, L'alouette, Las povre cœur]
  - A chanson à quatre voix in "6 Gaillardes et six Pavanes avec 13 chansons" Attaingnant, Paris s.d., [c. 1528]
  - A chanson in "34 chansons". Attaingnant, Paris c. 1528
  - A chanson in "37 chansons". Attaingnant, Paris d.d. [c. 1528]
  - A chanson in "chansons nouvelles en musique". Attaingnant, Paris 1528
- 1529
  - 5 chansons in "31 chansons". Attaingnant, Paris 1529
  - 2 chansons in "34 chansons". Attaingnant, Paris 1529
- 1530
  - A chanson in "29 chansons". Attaingnant, Paris 1530
  - A chanson in "36 chansons" Attaingnant, Paris 1530
- 1531
  - La Bataille in "Canzoni frottole et capitoli da diversi", V. Dorich, Rome 1531
  - A chanson in "25 chansons". Attaingnant, Paris, February 1531
- 1533
  - Vingt et quatre chansons musicales ... composées par maistre Cl. Janequin. Attaingnant, Paris, after 1533
- 1534
  - 4 chansons in "28 chansons". Attaingnant, Paris, October 1534
  - 7 chansons in "28 chansons". Attaingnant, Paris, March 1534
- 1535
  - A chansons in "Del secondo libro delle canzoni franzese". O. Scotto, Venice s.d. (c. 1535)
  - 4 chansons in "Livre 1er contenant 29 chansons". Attaingnant, Paris 1535
- 1536
  - 13 chansons (3 anonymous) in "Tiers livre contenant XXXI chansons musicales ... composeez par Jennequin et Passereau". Attaingnant, Paris, May 1536
  - A chanson in "Second livre contenant 25 chansons". Attaingnant, Paris 1536
  - A chanson in "Second livre contenant 31 chansons...". Attaingnant, Paris 1536
- 1537
  - Les chansons de la Guerre, la chasse, le chant des oyseaux, l'alouette, le rossignol composees par maistre Clement Jennequin. Attaingnant, Paris, May 1537
  - A chanson in "Second livre contenant 30 chansons vieilles esleues". Attaingnant, Paris 1537*
  - A chanson in "Tiers livre". Attaingnant, Paris 1537
- 1538
  - Congregati sunt, motet à quatre voix in "Liber cantus triginta novem motetos", J. de Buglhat, Ferrara 1538
  - 2 chansons in "Second livre contenant 26 chansons". Attaingnant, Paris, 1538; 1540 (second edition)
  - 10 chansons in "Venticinque canzoni francesi a 4 di C. Janequin e di altri ... Lib. I". Gardane, Venice 1538
  - A chanson in "Le Parangon des chansons Second livre". Jacques Moderne, Paris 1538 : 1540 (second édition)
  - A chanson in "Le Parangon des chansons Tiers livre". Jacques Moderne, Paris 1538; 1543 (second édition)
- 1539
  - A chanson in "6e livre". Attaingnant, Paris 1539
- 1540 (before 1540), Missa super La Bataille à 4 voix in "Liber decem missarum", Lyon undated; Jacques Moderne 1540 (second édition); ms. 1550, National bibliothek Vienna; "Nach-druck f. A. v. Ysenburg, Graf zu Büdingen" without place of production 1560
  - 8e livre contenant XIX chansons nouvelles ... de la facture et composition de maistre Cl. Jennequin. Attaingnant, Paris 1540
  - 4 chansons in "5e livre". Attaingnant, Paris 1540
  - 5 chansons in "Le parangon des chansons 7e livre. Jacques Moderne, Paris, 1540
  - A chanson in "Le Parangon des chansons 6e livre". Jacques Moderne, Paris 1540
  - A chanson in "Le Parangon des chansons 5e livre". Jacques Moderne, Paris, undated
- 1541
  - 30 chansons in Di Festa libro primo de madrigali a tre voci [...] Aggiuntovi simil-mente trenta canzoni francese di Janequin. A. Gardane, Venice 1541; 1543 [with annotations]
  - A chanson in "Le Parangon des chansons 9e livre" Jacques Moderne, Paris 1540
- 1543
  - 2 chansons in "14e livre". Attaingnant Paris, 1543
  - 8 chansons in "13e livre". Attaingnant, Paris 1543
  - A chanson in "12e livre". Attaingnant, Paris 1543
- 1544
  - 4 chansons in "15e livre". Attaingnant Paris 1544
  - A chanson in "Le difficile des chansons Second livre". Jacques Moderne, Paris 1544
- 1545
  - 2 chansons in "22e livre". Attaingnant, Paris 1545
  - 2 chansons in "16e livre". Attaingnant, Paris 1545
  - 2 chansons in "18e livre". Attaingnant, Paris 1545
  - 6 chansons in "17e livre". Attaingnant, Paris 1545
  - Clément Janequin ... Libro primo. Gardane, Venezia 1545 [La Bataille, l'Alouette, les Cris de Paris, le Chant des oiseaux, le Rossignol]; reprinted in "Le premier livre de Clement Janequin". H. Scotto, Venice 1550
  - Le 10e livre contenant la Bataille a 4 de C. Janequin avecq la 5e partie de Ph. Verdelot si placet. Tielman Susato, Antwerp 1545
- 1547
  - 7 chansons in "23e livre". Attaingnant, Paris 1547
  - 5 chansons in "25e livre". Attaingnant, Paris 1547
  - 4 chansons in "24e livre". Attaingnant, Paris 1547
- 1548
  - A chanson in "26e livre". Attaingnant, Paris 1548
  - 8 chansons in "Secondo libro di canzoni francese à quatre voix del divino et eccellente musico Clement Janequin et altri autori". Gardane, Venezia 1548; Scotto, Venice (second édition); Gardane Venice 1560 (third édition)
- 1549
  - 6 chansons in "30e livre". Attaingnant, Paris 1549
  - 31e livre contenant XXX chansons nouvelles ... de la facture et composition de maistre Cl. Jennequin. Attaingnant, Paris, May 1549
  - 5 chansons in "33e livre". Attaingnant, Paris 1549
  - 3 chansons in "Second livre". Nicolas Du Chemin, Paris, 1549
  - 1er livre contenant 28 Pseaulmes de David traduictz ... par M. Cl. Marot. Du Chemin, Paris 1549 (1 édition comprising 2 volumes and 1 édition comprising 4 volumes)
  - 2 chansons in "1er livre contenant 25 chansons". Nicolas Du Chemin, Paris 1549
  - A chanson in "Tiers livre". Nicolas Du Chemin, Paris 1549
  - A chanson in "34e livre". Attaingnant, Paris 1549
  - A chanson in "Quart livre", Nicolas Du Chemin, Paris 1549
- 1550
  - 4 chansons in "8e livre". Nicolas Du Chemin, Paris
  - 2 chansons in "9e livre". Nicolas Du Chemin, Paris 1551
  - 4 chansons in "7e livre". Nicolas Du Chemin, Paris 1550
  - 7 chansons in "6e livre". Nicolas Du Chemin, Paris
  - 6 chansons in "5e livre". Nicolas Du Chemin, Paris 1550
- 1552
  - 2 chansons à trois voix in "La Fleur de chansons et 6e livre". Susato, Antwerp undated [1552]
  - 7 chansons à trois voix in "La Fleur de chansons et 5e livre à trois parties". Susato, Antwerp 1552
  - 5 chansons in "10e livre", Nicolas Du Chemin, Paris 1552; 1554 (second édition)
  - 3 chansons in "Les Amours de P. de Ronsard". Veuve de La Porte, Paris 1552; 1553 (second édition)
  - A chanson in "Tiers livre des chansons". Phalèse, Leuven 1552
- 1554
  - 3 chansons in "11e livre", 1554
  - Missa super L'Aveuglé dieu à 4 voix in "Missae duodecim cum 4 voci", Du Chemin, Paris 1554
- 1555
  - Second livre des inventions musicales de M. Cl. Janequin. Contenant le chant des oyseaux, le chant de l'alouette, le chant du rossignol, la prise de Boulongne, la réduction de Boulongne, la meusnière de Vernon, Un jour voyant, Herbes et fleurs le tout à quatre parties nouvellement reveu. Nicolas Du Chemin, Paris August 1555
  - Le caquet des femmes à 5 parties [...] nouvellement reveu et corrigé. Nicolas Du Chemin, Paris 1555
  - 1er livre des inventions musicales de M. Cl. Janequin. Contenant la Guerre, la Bataille de Metz, la Jalouzie. Le tout à 5 parties nouvellement reveu, corrigé. Nicolas Du Chemin, Paris, July 1555
  - La Vénerie autrement dit la chasse [...] à 4 et à 7 parties, nouvellement reveue et corrigée par luy. Nicolas Du Chemin, Paris, September 1555
  - Second livre de chansons et cantiques spirituels ... à quatre parties. Du Chemin, Paris, 1555
- 1556
  - Premier livre contenant plusieurs chansons spirituelles, avec les lamentations de Jérémie. Adrian Le Roy & Robert Ballard, Paris 1556
  - 5 chansons in "6e livre de chansons nouvellement composées". Adrian Le Roy & Robert Ballard 1556; 4 in the second édition of 1559; 3 in the third édition of 1569; 4 in the fourth édition of 1578
  - 2 chansons in "1er livre de chansons nouvellement mises en musique". M. Fezandat, Paris 1556
  - 2 chansons in "8e livre de chansons nouvellement composées". Adrian Le Roy & Robert Ballard, Paris 1556; 1557 (second édition); 1 in the third édition of 1559; 1572 (fourth édition); 1573 (fifth édition); 1575 (sixth édition)
  - 3 chansons in "7e livre de chansons nouvellement composées". Adrian Le Roy & Robert Ballard, Paris 1556; 4 in the second édition of 1565
  - A chanson in "5e livre de chansons nouvellement composées". Adrian Le Roy & Robert Ballard, 1556
  - A chanson in "Second livre". M. Fezandat, Paris 1556
- 1557
  - 2 chansons in "12e livre". Nicolas Du Chemin, Paris 1557
  - 3 chansons in "Musica de diversi autori La Bataglia francese et la Canzon delli ucelli [...]. A. Gardane, Venice 1577 **[La Bataille, le Chant des oiseaux, Martin menoyt]
  - A chanson in "1er livre de chansons nouvellement mises en musique". Nicolas Du Chemin, Paris 1557
- 1558
  - Proverbes de Salomon mis en cantiques et rime françoise selon la verité hébraïque ... à quatre parties. Le Roy & Ballard, Paris 1558
- 1559
  - Octante deux pseaumes de David traduits en rithme françoise par Cl. Marot et autres avec plusieurs cantiques, ebda. 1559 (m. Brief dans Vs. an die Königin); 2 chansons spirituelles à quatre voix dans Le 1er livre de chansons spirituelles, mises en musique par divers autheurs et excellens musiciens, Lyon 1561, Straton, Lyon 2/1568, B. Rigaud.
- 1564
  - Verger de musique contenant partie des plus excellents labeurs de M. C. Janequin, à 4 et 5 parties [...] reveuz et corrigez par luy mesme. Premier livre, Adrian Le Roy & Robert Ballard, Paris 1559
  - A chanson in "Second recueil des recueils". Adrian Le Roy & Robert Ballard, Paris 1564
- 1573
  - A chanson in "4e livre de chansons". Adrian Le Roy & Robert Ballard, Paris 1573
  - une chansons "11e livre de chansons". Adrian Le Roy & Robert Ballard, Paris 1573.
- 1578
  - 2 chansons à trois voix in "Second livre de chansons à trois parties" Le Roy & Ballard, Paris 1578
- Undated
  - Le difficile des chansons 1er livre contenant XXII chansons nouvelles [...] de la facture et composition de Me Cl. Janequin. Jacques Moderne, Paris undated

=== Modern publications ===
- Bordes Charles (1863–1909), Chansonnier du XVIe siècle. Paris 1905 [4 chansons]
- Brennecke Wilfried (*1926, éditeur), Carmina germanica et gallica (I). Bärenreiter-Verlag Kassel 1956 [une chanson].
- Cauchie Maurice (1882–1963, éditeur), Clément Janequin. 30 chansons à 3 et 4 voix. Rouart, Paris 1928

—, Le caquet des femmes. Rouart, Paris 1925 —, Les cris de Paris, Florilège du concert vocal de la Renaissance. (3) 1928 —, Quinze chansons du XVIe siècle. 1926 —, Un psaumes à quatre voix. Dans "Cauchie Maurice, "Mélanges de musicologie offerts à M. Lionel de La Laurencie", Droz, Paris 1933

- Eitner Robert (1832–1905, éditeur), 60 chansons zu 4 Stimme. Publikationen der Gesellschaft für Musikforschung, herausgegeben (23) 1899 [deux chansons]
- Expert Isidore-Norbert-Henry (1863–1952, éditeur), Extraits des maîtres musiciens de la Renaissance française (18-21, 23, 28-30). 1905 [huit chansons]

—, chansons (Attaingnant 1528). in "Maîtres musiciens de la Renaissance française" (VII) 1898 —, 31 chansons d'Attaingnant. in "Maîtres musiciens de la Renaissance française" ( V), Paris 1897 [5 chansons] —, La Fleur des musiciens de P. de Ronsard. Paris 1923 [trois chansons; édité précédemment par Jean Tiersot dans "Sammelbände der Internationalen Musikgesellschaft (IV) 1902 / 1903, p. 119-128] —, L'alouette (avec les 5 voix de Claude Le Jeune). Leduc, Paris 1900 —, Répertoire populaire de la musique de Renaissance. Senart, Paris 1914 [ Hélas mon dieu] —, Messe La Bataille. Salabert, Paris 1947 —, Florilège du concert vocal de la Renaissance. (1) 1928 (4 chansons)

- Indy Vincent d' (arrangeur), La guerre de Renty (ajout d'une voix). Rouart, Paris 1916
- Lesure François (1923–2001, publisher), Motet Congregati sunt. Éditions de l'Oiseau-Lyre, Monaco 1950

—, Anthologie de la chansons parisienne au XVIe. Éditions de l'Oiseau-Lyre; Monaco 1952 [5 chansons]

- Merritt Arthur Tillman (1902–1998), Édition monumantale des chansons polyphoniques de Clémant Janequin [6 v.; in collaboration with François Lesure]. 1971
- Motet Congregati sunt dans "Sixteenth-Century Motet" (14) 1995
- Norsen Rolf (ed.) Clement Janequin: The Sacred Works (online edition) at clement-janequin.com. 2014

== List of chansons ==
- A ce joly minimoys [Merritt, III, 97]
- A toy, mon Dieu, mon coeur morte [1549; 1559]
- A toy, o Dieu, qui es le haut [1559]
- Ainsi que la bische rée [1559]
- Aller m'y fault [Merritt, I, 7]
- Allons, fuyons, buvons [Merrit, II, 45]
- Alors qu'affliction me pese [1559]
- Alors que de captivité [1559]
- Amour ayant de ma grand passion [Merrit, IV [121]
- Amour cruel, mon Dieu* [Merritt VI, 246]
- Amour cruel de sa nature (M. de Saint-Gelais) [Merrit, II, 72]
- Amour et moy avons faict [Merrit, IV [133]
- Amour vainc tout [Merrit, VI, 231]
- Après avoir constamment attendu [1559]
- Assouvy suis [Merritt, I, 8]
- Au cri du povre délaissé [1558]
- Au despartir triste deul [Merrit, II, 29]
- Au joly jeu du pousse avant [Merritt, I [12]
- Au moins mon Dieu ne m'abandonne [1556]
- Au premier jour du joly moys [Merrit, IV [115]
- Au verd boys je m'en iray [Merritt, I [132]
- Aussi tost que je voy m'amye [Merrit, IV [156]
- Aux parolles que je veux dire [1549; 1559]
- Avant que partiez de ce lieu [Merrit, V, 202]
- Ayé pitié du grant mal (Claude Chappuys) [Merrit, II, 27]
- Baisez moy tost [Merritt, III, 83]
- Bel aubépin verdissant (P. de Ronsard) [Merrit, VI, 251]
- Bien heureux est la personne [1559]
- Bien heureux est quiconques sert à Dieu [1559]
- Branlez vos piques (La guerre de Renty) [Merrit, VI, 254]
- Ca, ces beaulx yeux [Merrit, IV [149]
- Ce disoit une jeune dame [Merrit, IV [168]
- Ce faux amour [Merrit, VI, 245]
- Ce may nous dit la verdure [Merrit, V, 214]
- Ce moys de may [Merritt, I [10]
- Ce n'est pas moy [Merrit, VI, 239]
- Ce n'est point moy mon oeil [Merrit, V [194]
- Ce petit dieu qui vole [Merrit, V, 213]
- Ce sont gallans [Merrit, II, 57]
- Ce tendron est si doulce [Merritt, III, 96]
- Celle qui veit son mari [Merrit, II, 71]
- Celuy qui du moqueur [1558]
- Cent baysers au despartir [Merrit, V [180]
- Cent mille foys [Merrit, V [175]
- C'est a bon droit [Merrit, II, 28]
- C'est a moy qu'en veult [Merrit, V [188]
- C'est gloire à Dieu [1558]
- C'est mon amy [Merrit, VI, 229]
- Chantons, sonnons, trompettes [Merritt, I [17]
- Chasse rigueur loing de toy [Merrit, V, 208]
- Christ est-il mort (Le devis chrestien) [1556]
- Comment se sied seulette et désolée (Lamentations de Jérémie) [1556]
- Comment se sied le Seigneur [1556]
- Comment sont ils noz Roys [1556
- De tes doulx yeulx [Merrit, II, 30]
- De céans jusques chez m'amye [Merrit, V, 204]
- De labourer je suys cassé [Merrit, II [19]
- De pleurs la nuict [1556]
- De son amour me donne [Merrit, VI, 225]
- De ta bouche tant vermeille [Merrit, V, 215]
- De tout mon cueur t'exalteray [1549; 1559]
- De vostre amour je suys deshérité [Merrit, II, 36]
- De vray amour [Merrit, II, 52]
- Deba contre mes debateurs [1559]
- Des eaux la claire liqueur [1558]
- Des ma jeunesse ils m'ont fait mille assaux [1559]
- Des qu'adversité nous offense [1559]
- D'estre subject [Merrit, II, 47]
- Di moy, ma soeur [Merrit, V, 216]
- Dictes sans peur (François I) [Merrit, II, 24]
- Dictes moy doncq* [Merrit, VI, 228]
- Dieu doint le bonjour [Merrit, IV [157]
- Donne secours, Seigneur, il en est l'heure [1549; 1559]
- Donnez au Seigneur gloire [1559]
- Don't vient cela, Seigneur, je te supply [1549]
- Don't vient que ce beau temps [Merrit, IV [170]
- D'où vient cela Seigneur [1559]
- Doulens regretz, ennuys [Merrit, VI, 241]
- Du malin les faits vicieux [1549; 1559]
- Du hault rocher d'éternelle puissance [1556]
- Du fons de ma pensée [1559]
- D'un seul soleil [Merrit, V, 205]
- Dur acier et diamant [Merrit, IV [150]
- Elle craint cela [Merrit, II, 33]
- Elle mérite pour ses grâces [Merrit, IV [166]
- Elle voyant approcher [Merrit, IV [169]
- En amour y a du plaisir [Merrit, V [198]
- En attendant son heureuse présence [Merrit, II, 21]
- En escoutant le chant mélodieulx (Le chant du rossignol
- En fut il onc [Merritt, III [105]
- En la prison les ennuys [Merrit, VI, 242]
- En luy seul gist ma fiance parfaitte [1559]
- En me baisant [Merrit, V [177]
- En m'en venant de veoir [Merritt, III, 98]
- Escoutez tous gentilz (La bataille de Marignan, La guerre), 5 voix [Merrit, VI, 234]
- Escoutez tous gentilz (La bataille de Marignan, La guerre), 4 voix [Merritt, I, 3]
- Espars sur moi de ton jardin [1556]
- Estans assis aux rives aquatiques [1559]
- Estant oisif (Le caquet des femmes) [Merritt, III [108]
- Est-il possible, o ma maistresse [Merrit, IV [153]
- Et vray Dieu qu'il m'ennuye [Merrit, IV [152]
- Faictes le moy [Merritt, I [16]
- Faisons le dire mensonger [Merrit, IV [164]
- Frapper en la roye [Merrit, II, 40]
- Frere Frappart troussé [Merrit, V, 207]
- Frere Lubin revenant (L. Jamet) [Merritt, III, 99]
- Frere Thibault (C. Marot) [Merrit, II, 70]
- Fy fy metez les hors [Merrit, II, 44]
- Fy fy cela est trop maigre [Merrit, II, 59]
- Fyez vous y si vous voulés [Merrit, II, 58]
- Gentilz veneurs (La chasse) [Merritt, I, 4]
- Grâces à toi, mon seigneur tout puissant [1556]
- Gros Jehan menoit [Merrit, IV [126]
- Guillot un jour [Merritt, III, 78]
- Hélas mon Dieu, y a il (Saint-Gelais) [Merrit, IV [135]
- Helas, amy, ta loyauté* [Merrit, VI, 253]
- Hellas, mon Dieu, ton ire (G. Guéroult) [Merritt, III [111]
- Herbes et fleurs [Merrit, VI, 237]
- Ho le meschant [Merrit, V [182]
- Honneur, vertu et action de grâces [1556]
- Il est permis trouver [Merrit, V [192]
- Il estoit une fillette [Merritt, III, 77]
- Il faut que de tous mes esprits [1559]
- Il feroit bon planter le may [Merrit, V [176]
- Il me suffit du temps passé [Merrit, II [18]
- Il n'est plaisir ne passe temps [Merrit, II, 46]
- Il s'en va tard [Merrit, IV [159]
- Incessamment je suis* [Merrit, VI, 227]
- Incontinent que j'en ouy [1559]
- Jamais ne cesseray de magnifier le Seigneur [1559]
- J'atens le temps [Merritt, III, 89]
- J'ay d'un costé l'honneur [Merrit, V, 206]
- J'ay dict, j'ay faict [Merritt, III [103]
- J'ay dit en moy de pres je visoroy [1559]
- J'ay double dueil [Merrit, IV [119]
- J'ay mis en toy mon esperance [1559]
- J'ay trop soubdainement aymé [Merrit, VI, 222]
- J'ay veu le temps [Merrit, II, 62]
- Je demande comme tout esbahy [Merrit, VI, 220]
- Je liz au cueur de m'amye [Merrit, IV [158]
- Je me veulx tant a son vouloir [Merrit, IV [155]
- Je ne congnois femme [Merrit, V [172]
- Je ne fus jamais si aise [Merritt, I [13]
- Je n'eu jamais de grandz biens [Merrit, IV [143]
- Je n'ose estre content (François I) [Merrit, II, 37]
- Je suis a vous [Merrit, IV [147]
- Je t'aymeray en tout obéissance [1549; 1559]
- Je veulx que m'amye soit telle (Saint-Romard) [Merrit, IV [125]
- Jehanneton fut l'aultre jour [Merritt, III, 75]
- J'endure tout, c'est bien raison [Merrit, V [190]
- Jusques à quand as estably [1549; 1559]
- La chasse, voir Gentilz veneurs
- La bataille de Marignan, voir Escoutez tous gentilz
- La bataille de Mets, voir Or sus branslés
- La fausse balance [1558]
- La femme sage édifie [1558]
- La guerre de Renty, voir Branlez vos piques
- La guerre, voir Escoutez tous gentilz
- La jalouzie, voir Madame voulés vous scavoir
- La meusniere de Vernon [Merrit, V, 211]
- La mort plus tost [Merrit, IV [136]
- La plus belle de la ville [Merrit, II, 23]
- La prise de Boulongne, voir Pour toy ton prince
- La sapience a basty sa maison [1558]
- La sapience esleve hault sa voix [1558]
- La terre au Seigneur appartient [1549; 1559]
- La, mon amy [Merrit, II, 48]
- Laissez cela [Merritt, I [15]
- L'alouette, voir Or sus, vous dormés trop
- Lamentations de Jeremie, voir Comment se sied seulette et désolée
- L'amour, la mort et la vie [Merritt, III, 87]
- Las on peult juger [Merritt, III [107]
- Las qu’on congneust (François I) [Merritt, III, 86]
- Las que crains tu, amy [Merrit, II, 38]
- Las si tu as plaisir [Merrit, IV [145]
- Las! en ta fureur aiguë [1549; 1559]
- Las, povre coeur [Merritt, I, 6]
- Las, si je n'ay si hault bien [Merrit, II, 36bis
- Las, si tu veulx en aultre part [Merrit, IV [154]
- Las, viens moy secourir [Merrit, IV [142]
- L'aultre jour de bon matin [Merritt, III [112]
- L'aveuglé dieu qui partout vole [Merrit, V, 209]
- Le caquet des femmes, voir Estant oisif
- Le chant des oiseaux, voir Réveillez vous, cueurs endormis
- Le chant du rossignol, voir En escoutant le chant mélodieulx
- Le devis chrestien, voir Christ est-il mort
- Le Dieu, le fort, l'éternel parlera [1559]
- Le fol malin en son cuer dit [1549; 1559]
- Le fruict de vie estoit vif [1556]
- Le jeu m'ennuye, jouez m'amye [Merrit, IV [127]
- Le lendemain des nopces [Merrit, IV [123]
- Le rossignol) [Merrit, II, 68]
- Le rossignol, voir En escoutant le chant mélodieulx
- Le sage enfant recoit [1558]
- Le Seigneur est la clarté [1559]
- Le Seigneur ta priere entende [1559]
- L'ermaphrodite est estrange [Merrit, II, 34]
- Les cieux en chacun lieu [1549; 1559]
- Les cris de Paris, voir Voulez ouir les cris de Paris
- Les gens entrés en ton héritage [1559]
- L'espoir confus [Merritt, III, 76]
- L'espoux à la premiere nuict (Marot) [Merrit, IV [122]
- L'homme en son coeur [1558]
- L'homme meschant s'enfuit [1558]
- L'omnipotent a mon Seigneur [1559]
- Loué soit Dieu qui ma main dextre [1556]
- Ma fille, ma mère [Merrit, II, 20]
- Ma peine n'est pas grande [Merritt, III [110]
- Madame voulés vous scavoir (La jalouzie) [Merritt, III [109]
- Madame a soy non aux aultres [Merrit, II, 22]
- Maintenant resjouyssons nous [Merrit, II, 43]
- Mais en quel ciel [Merrit, IV [140]
- Mais ma mignonne [Merrit, II, 39]
- Mais que ce fust secretement [Merrit, II, 61]
- Maistre Ambrelin confesseur (M. Guyet) [Merrit, V [186]
- Malade si fust ma mignonne [Merrit, IV [163]
- M'amye a eu de Dieu [Merritt, III, 84]
- Martin menoit son porceau (Marot) [Merrit, II, 60]
- M'en allé veoir la belle [Merrit, VI, 221]
- Mieux vaut un morceau [1558]
- Mieux vaut bonne renommée [1558]
- Misericorde au povre vicieux [1559]
- Mon Dieu, mon roy, ma foy [1556]
- Mon confesseur m'a dict [Merrit, II, 53]
- Mon ami est en grâce [Merrit, V [197]
- Mon Dieu me paist sous sa puissance [1549; 1559]
- Mon Dieu preste moy l'aureille [1559]
- Mon Dieu, j'ay en toy esperance [1549; 1559]
- Mon Dieu, mon Dieu, pourquoy m'as tu laissé [1549; 1559]
- Mon fils ne te glorifie [1558]
- Mon père m'a tant batu [3e livre de tabulature de leut ... Guillaume Morlaye. Paris 1558]
- My levay par ung matin [Merritt, I, 9]
- Nature ornant la dame (Ronsard) [Merrit, V, 218]
- Ne sois fasché si durant ceste vie [1549; 1559]
- Ne veuillés pas, o Sire [1549; 1559]
- Ne vous faschez si me voyez [Merrit, IV [165]
- N'ensuy le train des malins [1558]
- Non feray, je n'en feray rien (Saint-Gelais) [Merrit, VI, 244]
- Non point a nous, Seigneur [1559]
- Nous sommes en semblable affaire, 3 voix [1556]
- O bien heureux celuy dont les commises [1549; 1559]
- O bien heureux qui juge sagement [1559]
- O combien est plaisant et souhaitable [1559]
- O cruaulté logée (Marot) [Merrit, II, 73]
- O de Sion les enfans tant aimez [1556]
- O Dieu qui es ma forteresse [1559]
- O doulx aignel de la divinité [1556]
- O doulx regard, o parler [Merrit, IV [138]
- O dur amour [Merrit, IV [118]
- O fortune n’estois tu pas contente [Merritt, III, 88]
- O mal d'aymer [Merritt, III [104]
- O nostre Dieu et Seigneur amiable [1549; 1559]
- O peuple heureux, o terre bien partie [1556]
- O Seigneur! que de gens [1549; 1559]
- O, sotes gens qui s'en vont (Saint-Gelais), M iv, n.137]
- On a beau sa maison bastir [1559]
- On dict qu'amour n'a plus [Merrit, IV [129]
- On dit que vous la voulés [Merrit, II, 55]
- On vous est allé rapporter [Merrit, IV [124]
- Or sus tous humains [1559]
- Or as tu bien raison [Merrit, IV [160]
- Or avons nous de noz aureilles [1559]
- Or ne différez donc [Merrit, IV [162]
- Or peut bien dire Israel [1559]
- Or sus branslés (La bataille de Mets) [Merrit, VI, 235]
- Or sus pas je ne veuls [Merrit, V, 200]
- Or sus serviteurs du Seigneur [1559]
- Or sus vous dormés trop (L'alouette) [Merritt, I, 5]
- Or veit mon cueur [Merritt, III [102]
- Or vien ca, vien, m'amye [Merrit, II, 41]
- Ou cherchez vous du dieu d'amour* [Merrit, VI, 247]
- Ou mettra l'on ung baiser (Saint-Gelais) [Merritt, III, 92]
- Ouvrez moy l'huys [Merritt, III [100]
- Par mes haultz cris [Merrit, V [171]
- Pareille au feu* [Merrit, VI, 252]
- Passant au champ [1558]
- Petit jardin à Vénus consacré [Merrit, V [179]
- Petite nymphe folastre (Ronsard) [Merrit, V, 219]
- Petite damoyselle [Merrit, IV [146]
- Piteuse echo* (J. Du Bellay) [Merrit, VI, 240]
- Pleust a Dieu que feusse arondelle [Merrit, VI, 233]
- Plus ne suys ce que j’ay (Marot) [Merritt, III, 82]
- Pour certain je suis l'homme [1556]
- Pour loyaulment servir [Merrit, IV [131]
- Pour toy ton prince (La prise de Boulongne) [Merrit, V, 210]
- Pourquoy font bruit et s'assemblent les gens [1549; 1559]
- Pourquoy tournés vous voz yeux (Ronsard) [Merrit, VI, 250]
- Pourquoy voulés vous [Merrit, II, 54]
- Propos exquis et profondes parolles [1558]
- Propos exquis fault que de mon coeur saute [1549; 1559]
- Puisque je n'ay pour dire [Merrit, IV [167]
- Puisque mon cueur [Merrit, IV [120]
- Puisque vers vous aller [Merrit, IV [151]
- Quand contremont verras [Merrit, IV [148]
- Quand Israel hors d'Egypte sortit [1559]
- Quand j'ay esté quinze heures [Merrit, V [189]
- Quand je t'invoque, helas! escoute [1549; 1559]
- Quand je voy ma mignonne [Merrit, V [191]
- Quand ne te veoy [Merrit, VI, 223]
- Quel Dieu du ciel [Merrit, V [174]
- Quelque frapart [Merritt, III [114]
- Quelqu'un me disoit l'aultre jour [Merrit, V, 201]
- Qu'est ce d'amour (François I) [Merrit, II, 26]
- Qu'est ce que fait celuy [Merrit, V [187]
- Qui trouvera la femme vertueuse? [1558]
- Qui au conseil des malings n'a esté [1549; 1559; Cauchie 1933, 50]
- Qui ayme la doctrine [1558]
- Qui diable nous a faict [Merrit, V [193]
- Qui en la garde du haut Dieu [1559]
- Qui est-ce qui conversera [1549; 1559]
- Qui souhaittez d'avoir tout [Merrit, V [183]
- Qui veult d'amour scavoir [Merritt, III [106]
- Qui veult scavoir [Merrit, V [178]
- Qui vouldra voir (Ronsard) [Merrit, V, 217]
- Réconfortez le petit cueur [Merritt, I [1]
- Rendés à Dieu louange et gloire [1559]
- Response douce appaise [1558]
- Resveillez vous, c'est trop dormy [Merrit, II, 69]
- Reveillez vous, chascun fidelle [1549; 1559]
- Réveillez vous, cueurs endormis (Le chant des oiseaux), 5 voix [Merritt, I, 2]
- Réveillez vous, cueurs endormis (Le chant des oiseaux), 4 voix [Merrit, II, 67]
- Revenés souvent, m'amye [Merrit, II, 56]
- Revenge moy, prens la querelle [1549; 1559]
- Rions, chantons, passons temps [Merrit, II, 42]
- Robin couché a mesme terre [Merrit, V, 203]
- Sans l'espargner par sa forte puissance [1556]
- Sans y penser ne vouloir [Merrit, IV [134]
- Scavez vous quand je suis bien aise [Merrit, IV [144]
- Secouez moy [Merritt, III, 79]
- Seigneur Dieu, oy l'oraison mienne [1559]
- Seigneur je n'ay point le cueur fier [1559]
- Seigneur entens a mon bon droit [1559]
- Seigneur garde mon droit [1559]
- Seigneur le roy s'esjouira [1559]
- Seigneur puisque m'as retiré [1559]
- Si est-ce que Dieu est tres doux [1559]
- Si a te veoir n'ay ausé [Merrit, IV [161]
- Si celle la qui oncques (G. Colin) [Merritt, III, 85]
- Si come il chiaro [Merritt, III, 91]
- Si de bon cueur [Merritt, III, 93]
- Si Dieu vouloit pour chose [Merrit, VI, 240]
- Si Dieu vouloit que je feusse [Merrit, VI, 232]
- Si d'ung petit de vostre bien [Merrit, II, 31]
- Si en aymant je pourchasse [Merrit, II, 25]
- Si j'ay esté vostre amy [Merrit, II, 64]
- Si je me plains du mal [Merrit, IV [139]
- Si je m'y plain [Merrit, VI, 230]
- Si le coqu en ce moys [Merrit, IV [141]
- Si m'amie a de fermeté [Merrit, V [195]
- Si me voyez face triste [Merrit, V [173]
- Si tu as veu que pour ton feu [Merrit, V [199]
- Si vous l'avez rendez le moy [Merrit, V [185]
- S'il est si doulx, 3 voix [Merrit, VI, 226]
- S'il est si doulx, 4 voix [Merrit, II, 26bis]
- Souffrés ung peu [Merrit, II, 51]
- Souvienne toy, Seigneur et maistre [1556]
- Soy moy seigneur ma garde [1559]
- Suivez tousjours l'amoureuse entreprise [Merrit, II, 32]
- Sur l'aubépin qui est en fleur [Merrit, V [196]
- Sus approchez ces levres [Merrit, IV [132]
- Sus loués Dieu mon ame en toute chose [1559]
- Sus, sus mon ame il te faut dire bien [1559]
- Tant ay gravé au cueur (Saint-Gelais) [Merrit, II, 49]
- Tes jugemens, Dieu veritable [1559]
- Tétin refaict plus blanc (Marot) [Merrit, II, 66]
- Tout bellement s'en est allé* [Merrit, VI, 243]
- Tout honneur, louenge et gloire [1556]
- Tout mal et travail nous aborde, 3 voix [1556]
- Toute homme qui son esperance en Dieu asseurera [1559]
- Toutes les nuictz [Merrit, IV [130]
- Toy Cupido qui as toute puissance [Merrit, VI, 224]
- Tresves d'amours [Merrit, II, 65]
- Triste et marry [Merrit, V [178]
- Tu as esté, Seigneur, notre retraicte [1559]
- Tu as tout seul Jhan (Marot) [Merrit, IV [128]
- Un frais matin* [Merrit, VI, 248]
- Un gros prieur (Marot) [Merrit, V [181]
- Un jour voyant ma mignonne* [Merrit, VI, 236]
- Une belle jeune espousée (Saint-Gelais) [Merritt, III, 80]
- Une nonnain fort belle (Marot) [Merritt, III [113]
- Ung pélerin que les Turcs [Merrit, IV [117]
- Ung compaignon joly [Merritt, III, 95]
- Ung coup d'essay [Merrit, II, 50]
- Ung gay bergier [Merritt, III, 74]
- Ung jour Catin venant [Merrit, IV [116]
- Ung Jour Colin (Colin) [Merrit, II, 63]
- Ung jour que madame (Saint-Gelais) [Merritt, III [101]
- Ung jour Robin (Marot) [Merritt, III, 81]
- Ung mari se voulant coucher (Saint-Gelais) [Merritt, III, 94]
- Ung viellart amoureux [Merrit, II, 35]
- Va rossignol [Merritt, III, 90]
- Veillés, Seigneur, estre secors [1559]
- Ventz hardis et légiers [Merrit, V, 212]
- Vers les monts j'ay levé mes yeux [1559]
- Veu que du tout en Dieu mon cueur [1549; 1559]
- Vivons folastres (J.-A. de Baïf) [Merrit, VI, 238]
- Voulez ouir les cris de Paris (Les cris de Paris) [Merritt, I [14]
- Vouloir m'est pris de mettre [1559]

== Media ==
Ce moys de May (0:44)

La Guerre (5:47)
