= Antoine Francisque =

16th-century French lutenist and composer

Antoine Francisque (c. 1570 in Saint-Quentin – 1605 in Paris) was a 16th-century French lutenist and composer.

== Biography ==
Little is known of the details of Francisque's life. Francisque was born in Saint-Quentin circa 1570. On 23 February 1596, in Cambrai, he married Marguerite Behour [Bonhour], daughter of a tavern keeper. The marriage contract, registered in 1605, did not mention Francisque's profession.

He moved to Paris shortly afterwards, publishing his Le trésor d'Orphée in 1600. On 28 September 1601 he was identified as Anthoine François, a "lute player in Paris," in a document registering a mutual beneficiary relationship between him and his wife. The couple had no children at that time and lived in rue Sainte-Geneviève, Saint-Étienne-du-Mont parish, facing the Collège de Navarre.

He died in Paris on 5 October 1605. He lived in rue de la Huchette and was buried in the Église Saint-Séverin parish.

== Works ==
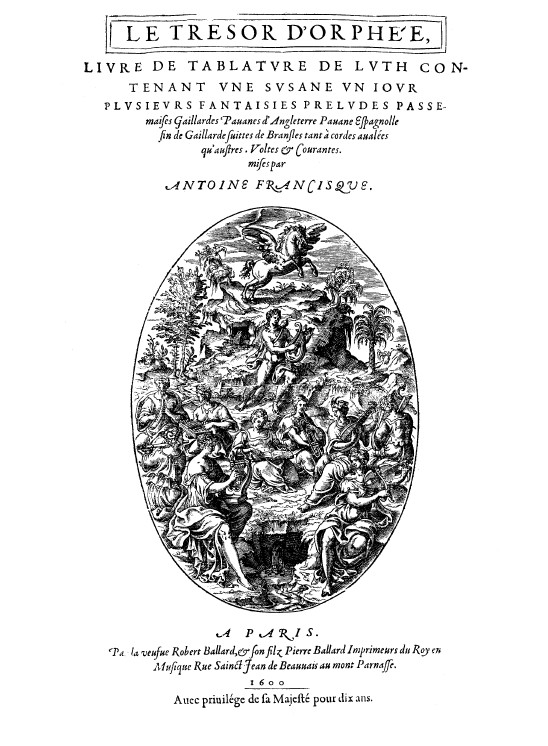
Title page of Le Trésor d’Orphée (Paris, 1600).

In 1600, Francisque published a unique collection of lute pieces:

Le trésor d’Orphée, livre de tablature de luth contenant une Susane un jour, plusieurs fantaisies, préludes, passemaises, gaillardes, pavanes d’Angleterre, pavane espagnolle, fin de gaillarde, suittes de bransles tant à cordes avalées qu’austres, voltes & courantes mises par Antoine Francisque. – Paris: Pierre I Ballard, 1600. – 2°, 32 f., French tablature.

The sole surviving copy of Le trésor d'Orphée is held in Paris, in the Département de la Musique of the Bibliothèque nationale de France, under the shelfmark RES VM7-369. The volume is dedicated to Henri II de Bourbon-Condé (who was only 12 in 1600), with a rather developed preface, rich with several allusions to antiquity. This dedication suggests that this nobleman was Francisque's pupil. The volume contains 71 pieces, including a transcription of Susanne un jour by Roland de Lassus, and a gaillarde made on a lavolta by Perrichon. These are purely instrumental pieces: preludes and fantasies, passemaises and pavanes, gaillardes, branles (simple, double, from Poitou, and Montirandé) and gavottes, a prelude followed by lavoltas, ballet, and finally a Cassandre. There is no mention of court ballets of the time.

Modern editions include:

- Transcription for piano by Henri Quittard: Paris, 1908.
- Free transcription for piano by Henri-Gilles Marchex : Paris, 1927.
- Facsimilé Minkoff, 1973, 1975 and 1993.

Francisque is not named as a composer in any other tablature. Some pieces of the Trésor are in an anonymous form in the Elias Mertel (Hortus musicali novus, Strasbourg, 1615) and Alessandro Piccinini (Intavolatura di liuto, Bologna, 1639) collections.

== Legacy ==
The music in Francisque's 1600 collection Le trésor d'Orphée is transitional in style between the Renaissance and Baroque periods, and shows a number of progressive features. The collection contains only one vocal intabulation (Suzanne un jour), two contrapuntal fantasias, and five préludes; the majority of the seventy-one pieces are dances. These include not only older, Renaissance types like the bransle and passamezzo, but newer, Baroque types like courantes and the first printed gavottes to be written for lute.

The music calls for a nine-course instrument, where previous books had never required more than seven courses. It also makes significant use of stile brisée, and includes the first French lute music to use an altered tuning. This last point is especially significant, because French composers would embark around 1620 on the exploration of a bewildering array of modified tunings, a period of experimentation that would last about five decades before stabilizing around the standard Baroque D-minor tuning, a radically different system from the tuning in fourths that had been in use since the middle ages. Francisque may therefore be reasonably considered a forerunner of an important historical trend. His altered tuning, which he termed accordes avalées, tuned the courses, lowest to highest, to B♭, E♭, F, G, B♭, F, B♭, D, G; departing from standard tuning or vieil ton by raising the third course by a semitone, lowering the fifth course by a whole tone, and lowering the ninth course by a major third.

Georg Fuhrmann, in his large collection of lute music Testudo Gallo-Germanica, printed in Nuremberg in 1615, incorporates instructions in German for intabulating polyphonic vocal music for the lute, which were supposedly based on a French text by Francisque. Francisque's original, however, has not been found. The single surviving copy of Le trésor d'Orphée is held by the Bibliothèque nationale de France in Paris; it contains no such instructions. If Francisque's authorship of Fuhrmann's material is accurate, it points to another publication by Francisque that is now lost. If, on the other hand, it was invented by Fuhrmann, it indicates that his reputation was such that Fuhrmann believed he could use it to add prestige to his own work.

Francisque's compositional style has been described as similar to that of Jacobus Reys, who served as lutenist to French kings Henry III and Henry IV, and whose music is known for audacious use of dissonance and difficulty of execution.

Henri Quittard's 1906 edition of Le trésor d'Orphée for piano is possibly the only transcription of lute music into modern notation that accounts for octave stringing on the lower courses and its effect on voice leading. He accomplished this with the use of small parenthetical noteheads in the higher octave where judged appropriate, similar to the practice in later editions of Baroque guitar music, such as Robert Strizich's edition of de Visée.

== Bibliography ==
- de La Laurencie, Lionel. Les luthistes Charles Bocquet, Antoine Francisque et Jean-Baptiste Besard in Revue de musicologie 7/18 (May 1926) p. 69-77 7/19 (August 1926) p. 126-133.
- Écorcheville, Jules. Actes d’état civil de musiciens insinués au Châtelet de Paris (1539–1650). – Paris : Fortin, 1907.
- Guillo, Laurent. Pierre I Ballard et Robert III Ballard, imprimeurs du roy pour la musique (1599–1673). – Sprimont et Versailles : 2003. 2 vol. Supplement on line on the CMBV website (Cahiers Philidor 33).
- Musiciens de Paris 1535-1792 after the Laborde file. Published by Yolande de Brossard. – Paris: Picard, 1965.
- Smith, Douglas Alton. A History of the Lute from Antiquity to the Renaissance. Lexington, Va.?: Lute Society of America, 2002, p. 213-215.

== Discography ==
- The Treasure of Orpheus: lute solos from Le Tresor d’Orphée by Antoine Francisque. James Edwards, lute. (CD Magnatune, 2004). Listen
- Soupirs meslés d'amour : airs de cour et pièces instrumentales de Nicolas Vallet, Robert Ballard, Elias Mertel, Antoine Francisque, Pierre Guédron. (CD Symphonia, 1998).
