= Mörike-Lieder =

Mörike-Lieder may refer to the following musical settings of poems by Eduard Mörike:

- Mörike-Lieder (Killmayer), a song cycle composed 2003–2004 by Wilhelm Killmayer; see Song cycles (Killmayer)#Mörike-Lieder
- Mörike-Lieder (Wolf), an 1888 collection of 53 songs by Hugo Wolf
