= Saint-Ouen Cemetery =

Cemetery near Paris, France

Coordinates: 48°54′27″N 02°20′51″E

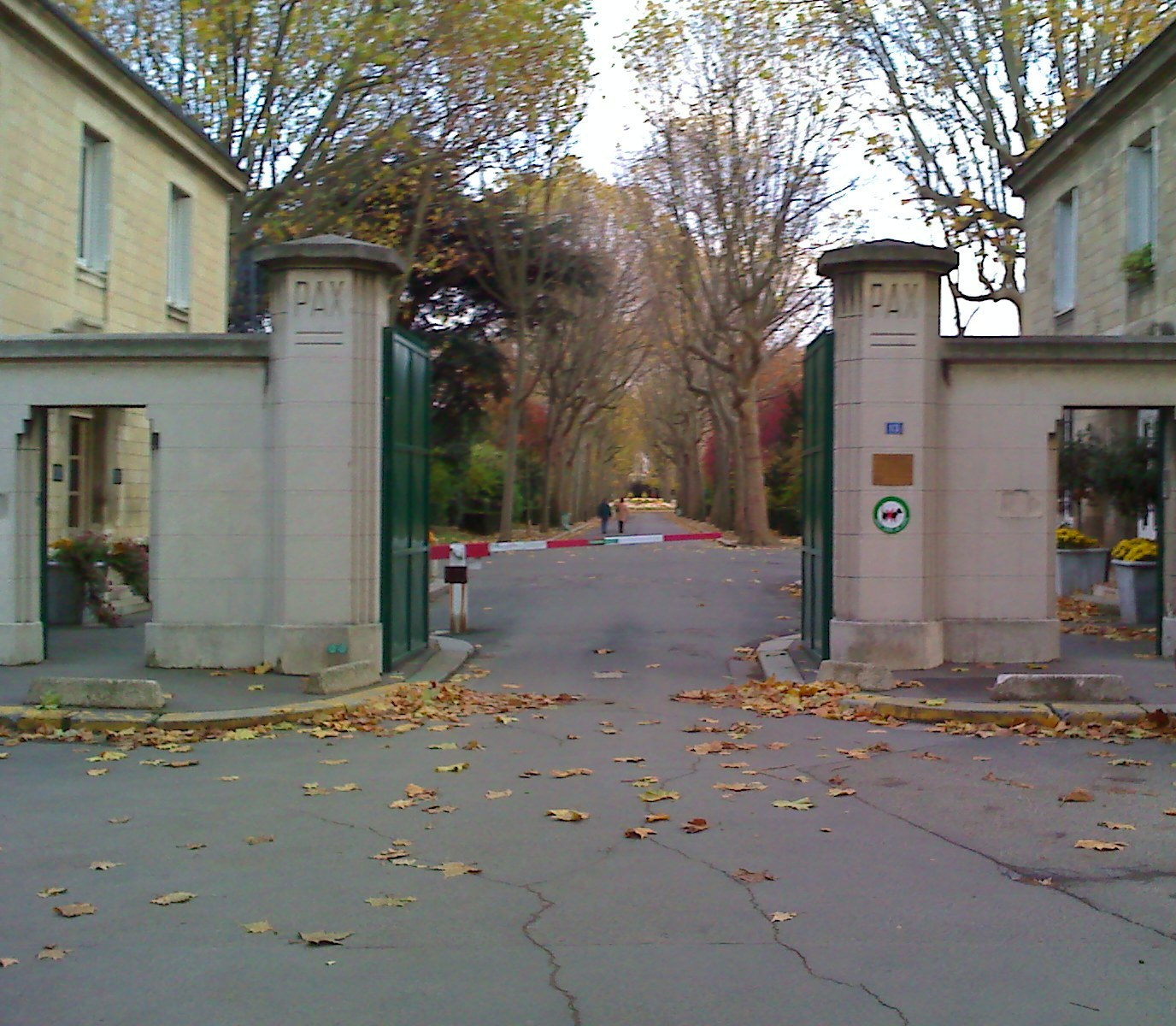
Main entrance.

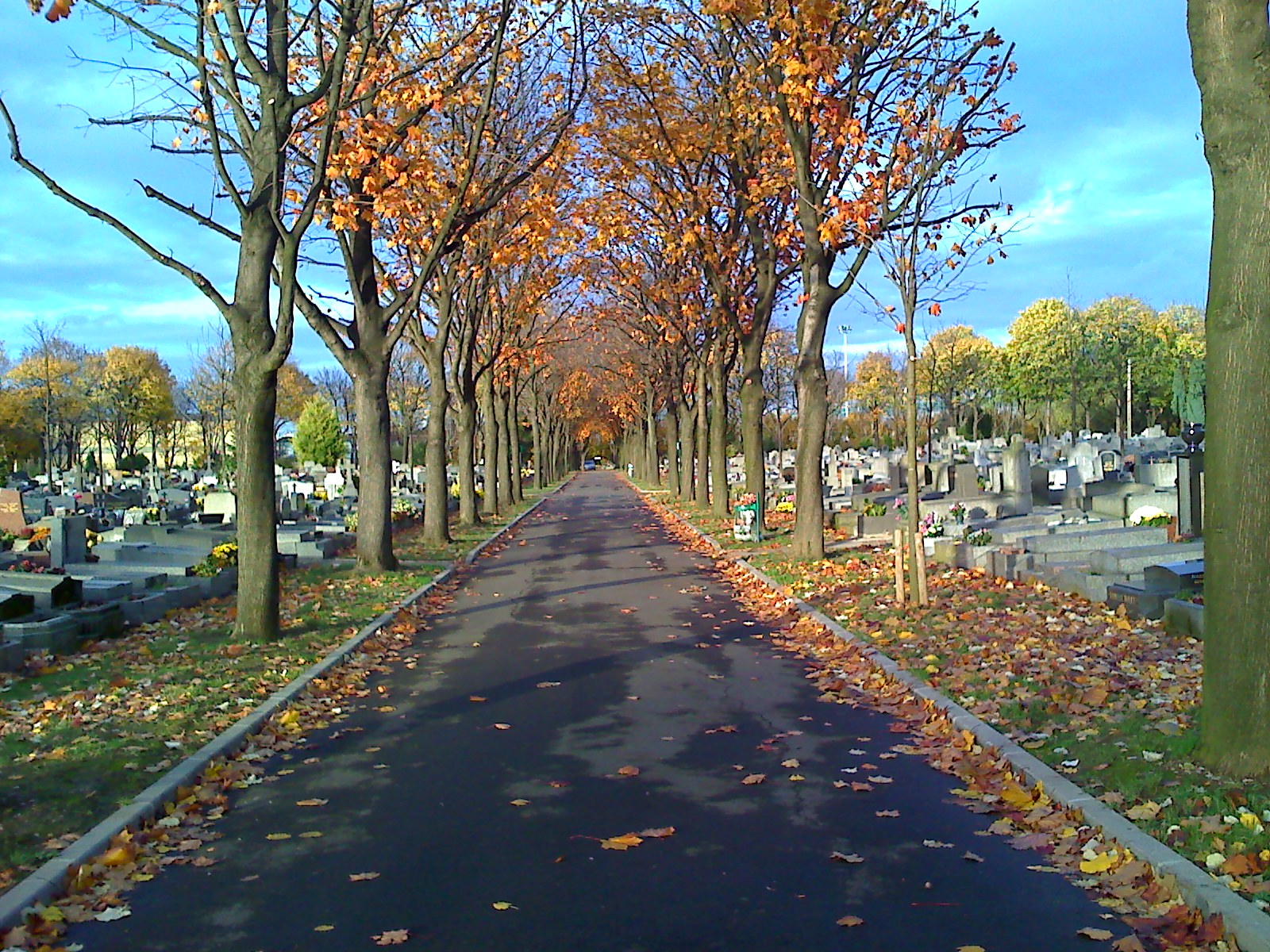

The Saint-Ouen Cemetery (French: Cimetière Parisien de Saint-Ouen) is located just north of Montmartre at Saint-Ouen, near Paris. The cemetery consists of two parts. The first, located on Rue Adrien Lesesne opened in 1860 and the second at 2 Avenue Michelet was opened on 1 September 1872.

== Notable burials ==
- Alphonse Allais (1854–1905), writer
- Amer Alwan (1957–2023), film director and actor
- Yvette Andréyor (1891–1962), actress
- Mireille Balin (1909–1968), film actress
- Roland Charmy (1908–1987), violinist, husband of harpist Lily Laskine
- Carmen Damedoz, née Marie Élise Provost (1890–1964), artists model, dancer and aviator
- Eugène Godard (1827–1890), aeronaut
- Lily Laskine (1893–1988), harpist
- Mona Goya (1909–1961), actress
- Suzanne Lenglen (1899–1938), tennis champion
- Alfred Manessier (1911–1993), painter
- Jules Pascin (1885–1930), artist (later re-interred)
- Henri Quittard (1864–1919), composer, musicologist
- Émile-Alexandre Taskin, (1853–1897), opera singer
- Suzanne Valadon (1865–1938), painter
- Kakutsa Cholokashvili (1888–1930), Georgian soldier (later re-interred)

The cemetery contains one British Commonwealth war grave, of a Royal Marines officer of World War I.
