= Henri Quittard =

French composer, musicologist and music critic

- Born: 16 May 1864; Clermont-Ferrand
- Died: 21 July 1919 (aged 55); Paris
- Occupations: Composer musicologist music critic

Henri Quittard (16 May 1864 – 21 July 1919) was a French composer, musicologist and music critic.

== Biography ==
A musician, composer, musicologist and music critic, Quittard was both the cousin of Emmanuel Chabrier (Quittard being the grandson of Aunt Zélie dear to Chabrier) and Roger Désormière who he chaperoned when, at the age of 15, the future conductor left Vichy to enter the Conservatoire de Paris (the maternal grandmother of Désormiere was a Quittard).

He obtained his baccalauréat in the early 1880s in Clermont-Ferrand where he began studying literature at the faculty, obtaining a bachelor's degree. At the instigation of Chabrier, he went to Paris, where he lived by giving lessons and trying to become a composer, following classes with César Franck. He also studied at the Oriental Languages (then École des langues orientales vivantes) where he met Louis Laloy.

On 21 May 1891, the unique theatre play by Paul Verlaine, Les Uns et les Autres, in one act and in verse, was premiered at the Théâtre des Variétés, performed by the troupe du Théâtre d'Art. The music was by Quittard, like that of Cherubin by Charles Morice, in the same program. This "symbolist" evening had to be for the benefit of Verlaine and Paul Gauguin. This stage music had the honor of the concert at the Société Nationale de Musique on 8 February 1893, and accompanied the revival of the play, by the troupe of the Odeon, on the occasion of the festivities for the inauguration of the statue of Verlaine in the Jardin du Luxembourg on 28 May 1912.

The second theatrical experience of Quittard took place one year after, again with the Théâtre d'Art. On 29 March 1892 was the générale, and on the 30th were given three plays including Les Noces de Sathan, an esoteric play by Jules Bois, music by Quittard at the theatre La Bodinière. (Debussy, solicited, withdrew late).

The last music by Quittard for the theater was Le Prince naïf in 1895 by the Gachons brothers. This play, or rather this "lumino-tale", by Jacques des Gachons, incidental music by Quittard, with sets by image-maker André des Gachons, was performed at the Théâtre Minuscule, 31, rue Bonaparte, in the hall of the newspaper La Plume.

A professor of music, he taught singing at the Lycée Carnot in the 1904 school year.

A musicographer (musicologist wasn't used by then), his first article was an obituary in Le Monde illustré dated 1 July 1899 dedicated to the singer Henri Sellier. Then he gave criticisms in another magazine, La Vogue.

From 1899 to 1902, Quittard took care of the musical part, from volume 24, for La grande encyclopédie : inventaire raisonné des sciences, des lettres et des arts (31 volumes, 1886–1902) by Henri Lamirault, publisher, Ferdinand-Camille Dreyfus and Marcellin Berthelot.

Also in 1899, he joined the team of the Schola Cantorum of Paris to the pulpit of St-Gervais-et-St-Protais, 3 years after its foundation. There, he published his great study on Henry Du Mont and gave four short articles to the Tablettes de la Schola.

From 1902 to 1910, he also collaborated with the Revue Musicale renamed Revue de la Société internationale de musique in 1908. In 1908/9, he gave studies to the Mercure Musical (later Le Mercure Musical-la Revue de la Société internationale de musique and finally the Bulletin français de la SIM) by Louis Laloy.

From 1904 to 1908, he was published in the Sammelbände der Internationale Musikgesellschaft, and the Zeitschrift der Internationales Musikgesellschaft, the two German magazines of the International Musicological Society.

Published from November 1901 until the end of 1905 as a serial in the Revue Musicale, his monograph devoted to Henry Du Mont was published in 1906 by the Mercure de France (Henri Quittard. Un musicien en France au XVIIe Henry Du Mont 1610–1684, étude historique et critique. Avec une préface de Jules Combarieu).

In 1907, Quittard joined the Matin which he left in 1909 for Le Figaro, where he remained until his death. He not only provided the musical chronicle but sometimes the judicial chronicle, the editorial secretariat or the military news during the war. He also witnessed the assassination of the newspaper's editor, Gaston Calmette, by Henriette Caillaux.

At the same time, following the death of Charles Malherbe, he became an archivist of the Bibliothèque-Musée de l'Opéra National de Paris in January 1912.

In 1917, musicologists gathered around Lionel de La Laurencie decided to take over the activities of the former French section of the International Music Society in order to found the Société française de musicologie, of which Quittard became deputy secretary. But above all, as he had done for his biography of Du Mont, he started publishing in the journal of the society, the Bulletin de la Société française de musicologie, his notes on Guillaume de Machaut and his work. Illness and his eventual death in July 1919 prevented him from finishing this work.

Quittard is buried at Saint-Ouen Cemetery.

He participated in a major project launched in 1913 by Albert Lavignac: the Encyclopédie de la musique et dictionnaire du conservatoire. War, Lavignac's death in 1916, the resumption of the project by La Laurencie ... the delays accumulated for a beginning of publication in 1922. But it was not until 1931, twelve years after his death, that the long article of Quittard on French music, Musique instrumentale jusqu'à Lully (Moyen Âge Renaissance XVIIe) was finally made available.
