= Roland Charmy =

French violinist (1908–1987)

- Born: 12 January 1908; Paris, France
- Died: 11 March 1987 (aged 79); Paris, France
- Burial place: Saint-Ouen Cemetery
- Occupations: Violinist; academic
- Employer: Conservatoire de Paris
- Style: Classical
- Spouse: Lily Laskine (m. 1936)

Roland Charmy (12 January 1908, Paris – 11 March 1987, Paris) was a French classical violinist and academic at the Conservatoire de Paris.

He was the son of Charles Joseph Louis Touchet (1885–1959), who wrote under the name Roland Charmy.

He was a teacher of Patrick Bismuth. In 1936, he married the celebrated harpist Lily Laskine. They are both buried, along with Roland Charmy Sr., at the Saint-Ouen Cemetery.
