= Martial d'Auvergne =

French poet (1420–1508)

Martial d'Auvergne (Martial of Auvergne, Martial of Paris, 1420 – 13 May 1508) was a French poet. Originally from Auvergne, he served as notary at Châtelet, and later as attorney (procureur) for the Paris parlement.

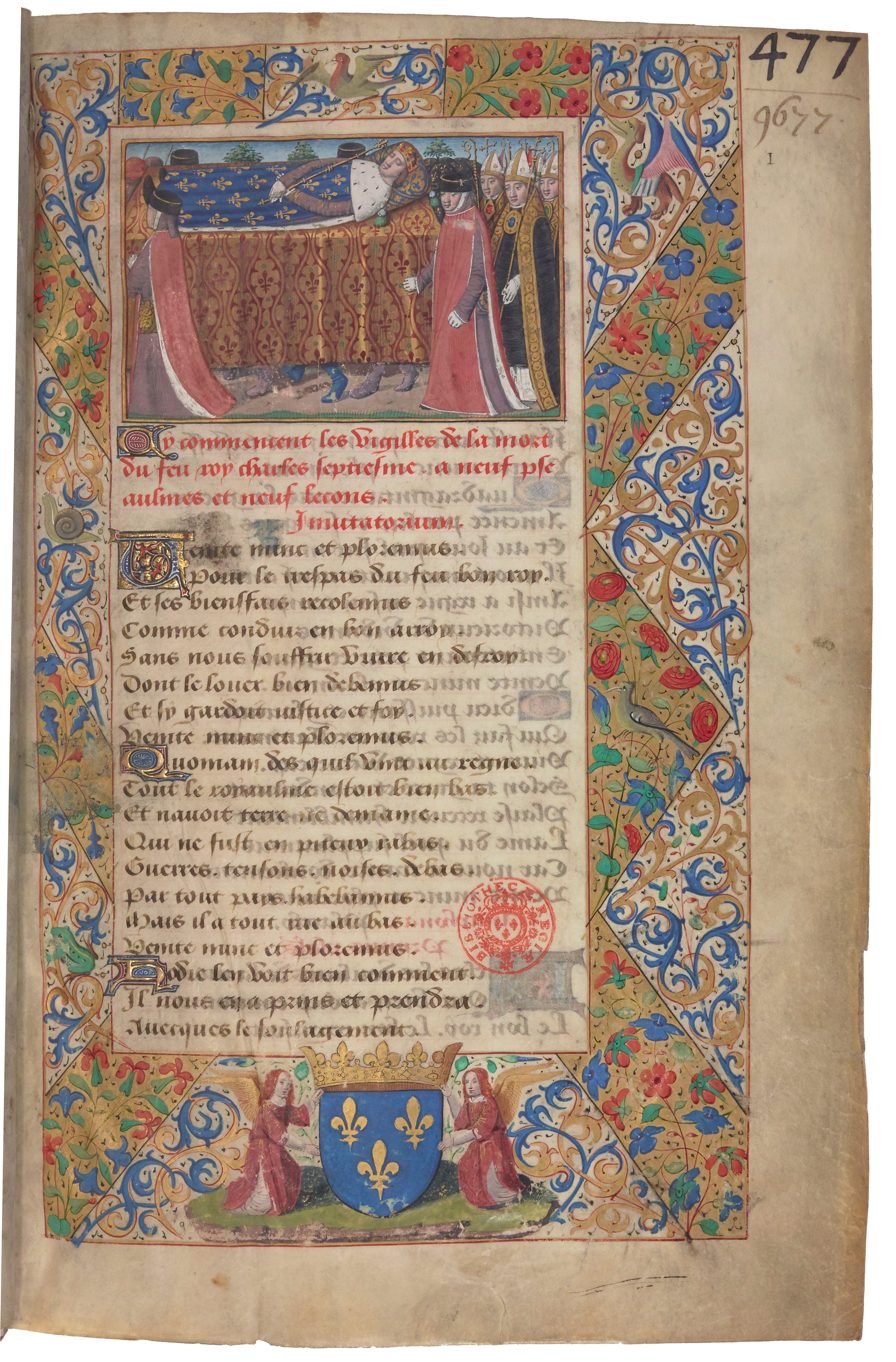
Funeral of Charles VIII, from the first page of the earliest manuscript of Martial's Vigiles

His most important work is the Vigiles de Charles VII à neuf psaumes et neuf leçons (1493, edited 1724), a versified chronicle of the Hundred Years' War. It was composed between 1477 and 1483, with the first manuscript completed in 1484 and the first edition printed in 1493.

His other works include Les Louenges de la benoiste Vierge Marie (1492), a devotional poem dedicated to Mary, mother of Jesus and the satirical Les Arrêts d’amour (undated, in prose) and L’Amant rendu cordelier à l’Observance d’amour (1490, in verse).

== See also ==
- Gilles d'Aurigny
