= Markus Schäfer =

German opera singer

- Born: 13 June 1961 (age 63); Andernach, Germany
- Occupation: Tenor singer
- Organization: Musikhochschule Hannover
- Website: www.tenor-markus-schaefer.de

Markus Schäfer (born 13 June 1961) is a German lyric tenor, a soloist in opera, oratorio, and Lied. He has performed with major opera houses and with the ensemble La Petite Bande. He has been a professor of voice at the Musikhochschule Hannover.

== Career ==
Born in Andernach, Schäfer grew up in Bad Ems where his father was church musician. Schäfer studied singing with Armand McLane. He studied sacred music in Düsseldorf and Karlsruhe. He made his operatic debut with the Zurich Opernstudio and later joined the ensemble of the Zurich Opera, then the Hamburgische Staatsoper and until 1993 the Deutsche Oper am Rhein. As a freelance singer, he performed Lied and concerts, including at major festivals. He has been a professor of voice at the Musikhochschule Hannover since 2008.

Schäfer has performed with the ensemble La Petite Bande, conducted by Sigiswald Kuijken, in concerts and recordings of Bach cantatas and in works by Mozart, as Ferrando in Così fan tutte, Ottavio in Don Giovanni and taking the tenor part of the Requiem. He is a regular soloist with the boys' choir Windsbacher Knabenchor, beginning in 1989 with the tenor part in Mozart's Requiem for the funeral of the assassinated Alfred Herrhausen. He is lead tenor in the ensemble Liedertafel of four male singers and pianist Gerold Huber. His recording of Bach's St Matthew Passion with Nikolaus Harnoncourt won a Grammy Award.

In 2014, Schäfer appeared in a performance of Carl Philipp Emanuel Bach's oratorio Die Auferstehung und Himmelfahrt Jesu, celebrating the composer's birth in 1714 as "C.P.E. Bach: 300th Birthday". Hermann Max conducted the Rheinische Kantorei and the Kleine Konzert, with soloists Veronika Winter (soprano), Matthias Vieweg (bass) and Hannes Rux (trumpet), at Eberbach Abbey, as part of the Rheingau Musik Festival. A review noted his pleasantly lyrical timbre and precise coloraturas. He recorded in 2017, with the pianist Siegfried Mauser, three song cycles by Wilhelm Killmayer, one based on late poems by Friedrich Hölderlin, two on poems by Georg Trakl.

== Recordings ==
- Secular Bach cantatas, Angenehmes Wiederau, BWV 30a, and Vereinigte Zwietracht der wechselnden Saiten, BWV 207, conducted by Gustav Leonhardt
- As Midas in Der Streit zwischen Phoebus und Pan, conducted by Hans-Jörg Albrecht
- Mozart: Zaide, conducted by Martin Haselböck
- Beethoven: Symphonies, conducted by Jos Van Immerseel
