= Lily Laskine =

French harpist (1893–1988)

- Born: Lily Aimée Laskine; 31 August 1893; Paris, France
- Died: 4 January 1988 (aged 94); Paris, France
- Burial place: Saint-Ouen Cemetery
- Education: Conservatoire de Paris
- Occupations: Harpist; music professor
- Employer: Conservatoire de Paris
- Style: Classical
- Spouse: Roland Charmy (m. 1936; died 1987)

Lily Laskine (born Lily Aimée Laskine; 31 August 1893 – 4 January 1988) was a French harpist, one of the most prominent of the 20th century, who was born in and died in Paris.

== Biography ==
Born to Jewish parents in Paris, she studied at the Conservatoire de Paris with Alphonse Hasselmans and became a frequent performing partner of several distinguished French flautists, including Marcel Moyse and Jean-Pierre Rampal. Laskine also served as professor of harp at the Conservatoire de Paris from 1948 to 1958. She was awarded the Legion of Honour in 1958.

She died in Paris.

In 1936, she married Roland Charmy, a violinist and academic at the Conservatoire de Paris.

== Discography ==
- L'Art de Lily Laskine, 1996, ASIN B00004UQ9H
- Concerto pour flûte et harpe by Wolfgang Amadeus Mozart, 2002, ASIN B000063JA9
- Japanese Melodies for Flute and Harp, 1994, ASIN B0000034O5

== Bibliography ==
- Nordmann, Marielle (1999). Lily Laskine. Éditions Cahiers du Temps. ISBN 978-2-911855-15-3.
- Pâris, Alain (1995). Dictionnaire des interprètes et de l'interprétation musicale au XX. Bouquins (in French). Paris: Éditions Robert Laffont. p. 604. ISBN 978-2-221-08064-1.
- Baker, Theodore; Slonimsky, Nicolas (1995). Dictionnaire biographique des musiciens; Baker's Biographical Dictionary of Musicians. Bouquins (in French). Translated by Marie-Stella Pâris. Paris: Éditions Robert Laffont. p. 2322. ISBN 978-2-221-06787-1.
