= Gilles d'Aurigny =

French poet and lawyer

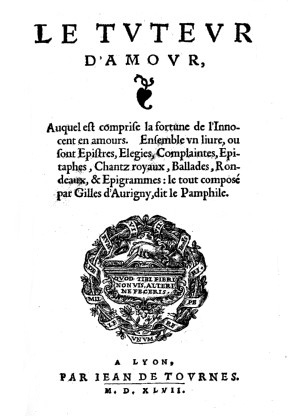
Le Tuteur d'amour (Lyon, 1547).

Gilles d’Aurigny (also Daurigny, surnamed Le Pamphile, d. 1553) was a French poet and lawyer.

Born in Beauvais, he served as attorney to the Parlement in Paris. He published a few legal treatises, such as Ordonnances des rois de France (1527, 1528) and Le Livre de police humaine (translation of a work by François Patrice, 1544). Little is known about his life. His best-known work is Le Tuteur d'amour of 1546, a poem in decasyllabic verse, at the time noted for its elegant style and rich imagination.

Literary works:

- Aureus de utraque potestate, temporali scilicet et spirituali, libellus, in hunc usque diem non visus. Somnium Viridarii vulgariter nuncupatus... published in 1516, a Latin commentary on Songe du Verger, a work attributed to Évrart de Trémaugon
- Le Cinquante-deuxiesme arrest d'amours, avecques ses ordonnances sur le fait des masques (1528), published together with the work of the same title by Martial d'Auvergne in 1545 (reprinted several times until 1555).
- La Généalogie des Dieux poétiques, nouvellement composée par l'Innocent esgaré, 1545, contains a French translation of Heracles by Lucian of Samosata.
- La Peincture de Cupido, par l'Innocent égaré (1545)
- Le Tuteur d'amour, auquel est comprise la fortune de l'Innocent en amour, composé par Gilles d'Aurigny dict le Pamphille. Ensemble un livre où sont epistres, elegies, complainctes, epitaphes, chants royaulx, ballades ou rondeaulx (1546), reprinted in Lyon 1547 , Paris 1553.
- Les Fictions poëtiques, colligées des bons et meilleurs autheurs, pour le soulagement et contentement de ceux qui désirent cognoistre et entendre chose difficile, avec la joyeuse description d'Hercules de Gaule, traduite du grec (de Lucien) en françois, par l'Innocent Égaré, published posthumously 1557. This is a more developed version of his Généalogie des Dieux poétiques de 1545.

Spiritual works:

- Trente psalmes du royal prophète David, traduictz de Latin en rithme françoise par Gilles d’Aurigny (1549, reprinted 1551), French translation of biblical psalms, set to music by Didier Lupi Second, later included in the Psautier de Paris along with works by Clément Marot, Robert Brincel, Claude-Barthélémy Bernard and Christophe Richer.
- Contemplation sur la mort de Jésus-Christ, par laquelle est montrées la différence qui est entre Adam céleste, & Adam terrestre, entre l'arbre où l'un a commis offense, & l'arbre où l'autre l'a remise : entre le fruit que l'un nous a ôté & le fruit que l'autre nous a donné: le tout en rime (1547), a lost work attributed d'Aurigny by Antoine Du Verdier (1585)

== Music ==
Wilhelm Killmayer set one of his poems in his song cycle Blasons anatomiques du corps féminin in 1968.
