= Patrick Bismuth =

French classical violinist and conductor

Patrick Bismuth (born 15 December 1954) is a French classical violinist and conductor.

== Biography ==
Bismuth studied the violin with Roland Charmy at the Conservatoire de Paris.

From 1993 to 1998, Bismuth was teacher of baroque violin at the Conservatoire de Paris and is currently teacher at the Versailles, Boulogne Billancourt, Paris and Reims conservatories. Learning the baroque violin allows him to interpret differently classical, romantic and contemporary repertoires.

He has performed in numerous concerts with his ensemble "La Tempesta" and the Atlantis Quartet, of which he is co-founder and also with the organist Louis Thiry, who opened up the horizon of early music to him. He has been involved for many years in Jean-Claude Malgoire's ensembles.

He has recorded Bach's Sonatas and Partitas for Solo Violin, Heinrich Biber's Rosary Sonatas and sonatas by Jean-Marie Leclair, but also works by Ravel, Kreisler and Enesco. Under the title "Musique dans la cité interdite" he took part with the "Ensemble XVIII-21" of flutist Jean-Christophe Frisch, to the recording of music from the imperial court of China in the 18th century, and also pieces by Teodorico Pedrini and Joseph-Marie Amiot.

In 2011, with the organist Louis Thiry, he recorded Tientos by Francisco Correa de Arauxo, playing the violin, the viola and the viola da spalla.

In 2017, together with his ensemble La Tempesta, he created a Campra opera-ballet based on a late copy of the original score, which has been lost or destroyed: Le Destin du Nouveau Siècle, a work identified by the violinist Hélène Houzel, and staged by Jean-Daniel Laval, with an original Baroque choreography by Irène Ginger. A CD recording of this opera was released by Château de Versailles Spectacles in 2021.

He has composed several solo and duo works for violin(s). In 2022, he wrote a musical "mythodrama", centered on a key figure of Inuit mythology, Takannaaluk, for four singers, a choir and five instruments.The text, in the Nunavummiutitut language (from northern Nunavut), by Rebecca Hainu and Noel McDermott, is sung and interspersed with spoken narrative passages in French.
