= Henri Giffard =

French airship and steam injector engineer

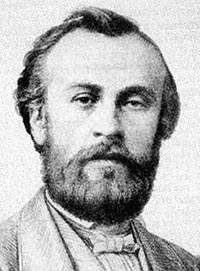
- Born: Baptiste Jules Henri Jacques Giffard; 8 February 1825; Paris, France
- Died: 14 April 1882 (aged 57)
- Occupation: engineer
- Known for: steam injector, Giffard dirigible airship

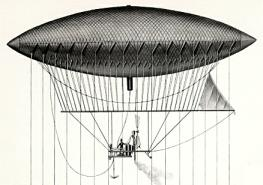
The Giffard dirigible, created by Giffard in 1852

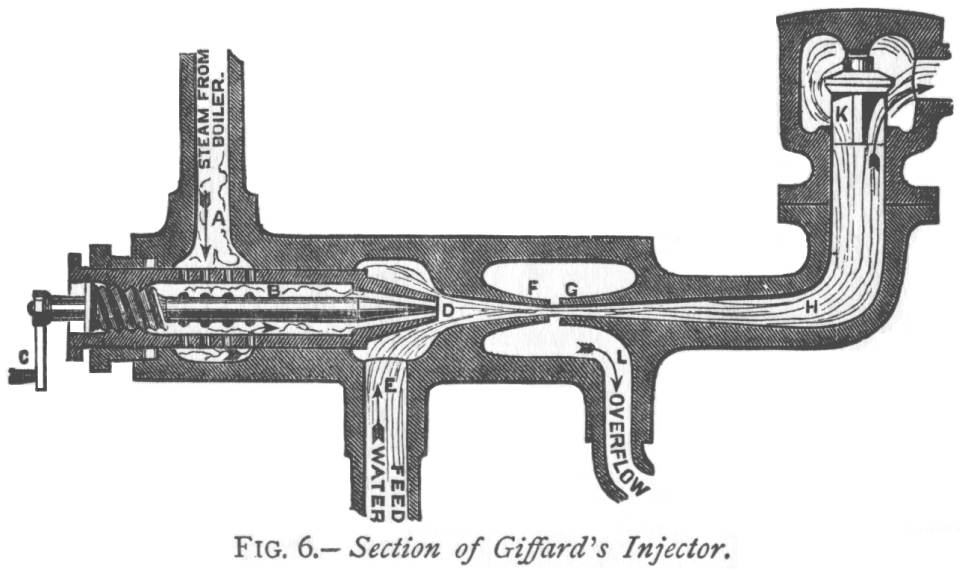
A- Steam from boiler, B- Needle valve, C- Needle valve handle, D- Steam and water combine, E-Water feed, F- Combining cone, G- Delivery nozzle and cone, H- delivery chamber and pipe, K- Check valve

Baptiste Jules Henri Jacques Giffard (8 February 1825 – 14 April 1882) was a French engineer. In 1852 he invented the steam injector and the powered Giffard dirigible airship.

== Career ==
Giffard was born in Paris in 1825. He invented the injector and the Giffard dirigible, an airship powered with a steam engine and weighing over 180 kilograms (400 lb). It was the world's first passenger-carrying airship (then known as a dirigible, from French). Both practical and steerable, the hydrogen-filled airship was equipped with a 2.2-kilowatt (3 hp) steam engine that drove a propeller. The engine was fitted with a downward-pointing funnel. The exhaust steam was mixed in with the combustion gases and it was hoped by these means to stop sparks rising up to the gas bag; he also installed a vertical rudder.

On 24 September 1852, Giffard made the first powered and controlled flight travelling 27 kilometres (17 mi) from Paris to Élancourt. The wind was too strong to allow him to make way against it, so he was unable to return to the start. However, he was able to make turns and circles, proving that a powered airship could be steered and controlled.

Giffard was granted a patent for the injector on 8 May 1858. Unusually, he had thoroughly worked out the theory of this invention before making any experimental instrument, having explained the idea in 1850. Others had worked on using jets, particularly Eugène Bourdon who patented a very similar device in 1857.

In 1863, he was appointed a Chevalier of the Légion d'honneur.

== Death and commemoration ==
In response to his declining eyesight, Giffard killed himself in 1882, leaving his estate to the nation for humanitarian and scientific purposes.

He is one of the 72 original names on the Eiffel Tower.

== Gallery ==
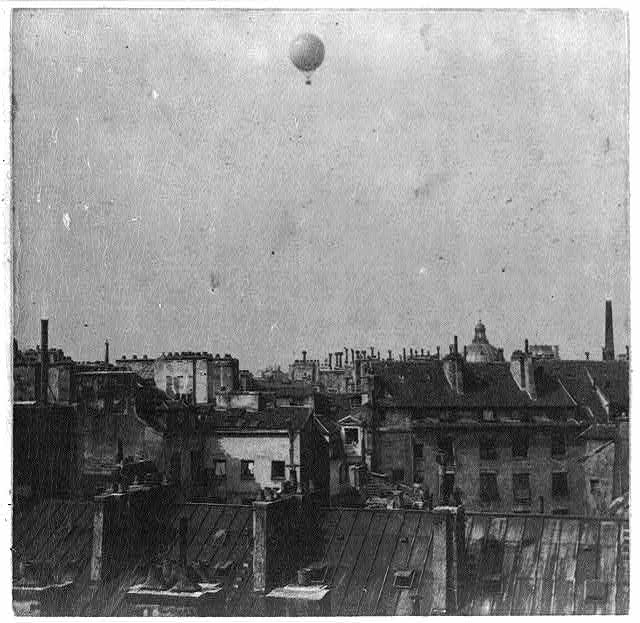
Balloon of Henri Giffard over Paris rooftops, 1878.

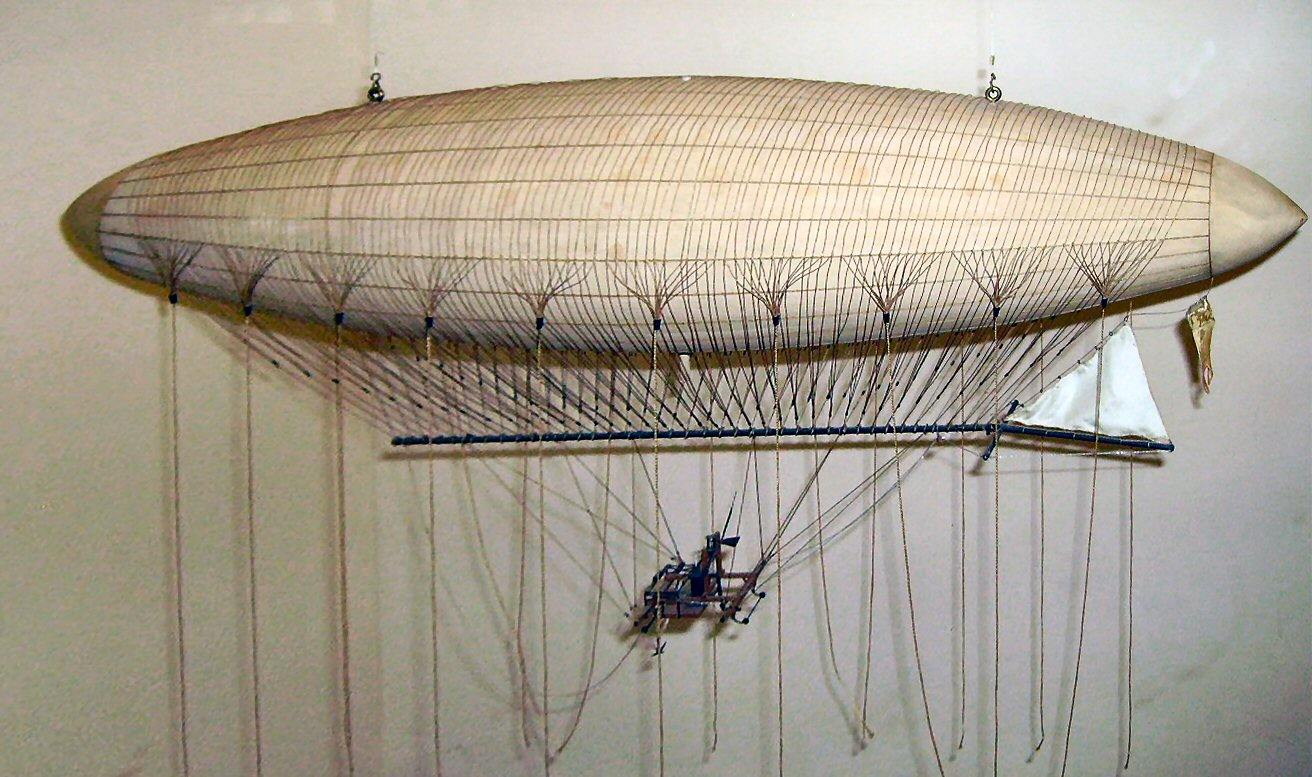
A model of the Giffard Airship at the London Science Museum.

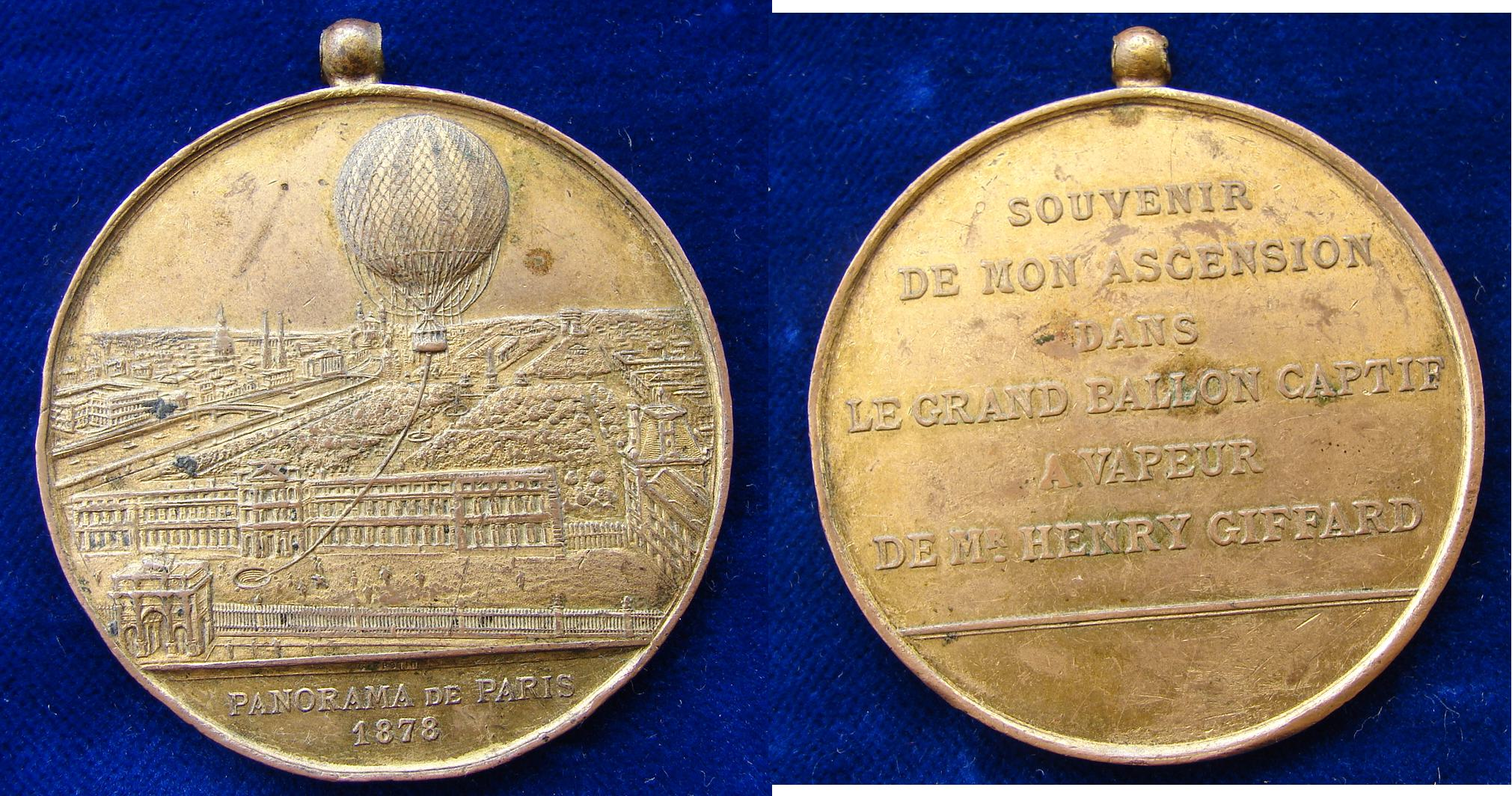
Medal of Giffard's balloon over Paris in 1878.

== See also ==
- List of firsts in aviation
- Alberto Santos-Dumont

== Bibliography ==
- Fonvielle, W. de (Wilfrid) (1885), Conférence sur les travaux aéronautiques de Henry Giffard, Imp. Collombon et Brûlé
- Tissandier, Gaston; Tissandier, Albert, 1839-1906, (illus.) (1879), Le grand ballon captif à vapeur de M. Henry Giffard. : Cour des Tuileries--1878-1879 (3. éd ed.), G. Masson
- Giffard, Henri, Henri Giffard papers, 1852-1910, ...Correspondence, notes, design drawings, broadsides, newspapers, printed illustrations, articles about Giffard, and newspaper clippings relating chiefly to Giffard's exhibition of a large captive balloon in the courtyard of the Tuileries in Paris in 1878. Includes his notes on hydrogen gas and design drawings for balloons...
