= Song cycles (Killmayer) =

Song cycles by Killmayer

- by Wilhelm Killmayer
- Period: contemporary
- Composed: 1953–2008
- Vier Canzonen nach Texten von Petrarca (1950); Rêveries (1953); Romanzen (1954); Drei Gesänge nach Hölderlin (1965); Tre Canti di Leopardi (1965); Blasons anatomiques ... (1968); Französisches Liederbuch (1979); Hölderlin-Lieder (1982); Neun Lieder nach Gedichten von Peter Härtling (1993); Trakl-Lieder (1993); Huit Poésies de Mallarmé (1993); Sappho-Lieder (1993); Heine-Lieder (1994); ... wie in Welschland lau und blau ... (1995); ... was dem Herzen kaum bewusst ...; Schweigen und Kindheit (1996); Mörike-Lieder (2003)

Wilhelm Killmayer, a German composer, wrote several song cycles, which form a substantial part of his compositions. The earliest cycle dates from 1953, the last was completed in 2008. He set poems by German romantic writers such as Friedrich Hölderlin and Joseph von Eichendorff, but was also inspired by French, Greek and Spanish poems, and by texts from the 20th-century poets Georg Trakl and Peter Härtling. He used mostly piano to accompany a singer, but also added percussion or other instruments, and scored some cycles in a version for voice and orchestra. His Hölderlin-Lieder, setting poems from the author's late period, were performed at major festivals and recorded.

== Overview ==
Interested in poetry and the voice, Killmayer composed more than 200 Lieder, including several song cycles. Most of them are set for voice and piano. Many songs set poems from German romantic poetry, such as others on 20th-century poems. Killmayer wrote four cycles of Hölderlin-Lieder based on poems by Friedrich Hölderlin, especially from his late period, two cycles based on Georg Trakl (1993 and 1996), and one based on Peter Härtling (1993).

Killmayer was first inspired by texts of French authors of the Renaissance, such as Charles d'Orléans, Mal Mariée and Clément Marot (1953), and by poems of Federico García Lorca in German (1954), which he set for soprano, piano, ensemble or percussion. From the 1990s, he composed cycles on poems by Stéphane Mallarmé and Sappho. Returning to German romanticism he set two song cycles based on poems by Joseph von Eichendorff for men's chorus, a songbook inspired by Heinrich Heine, a cycle based on poems and Eduard Mörike. His song cycles, as his other works, were published by Schott.

The following table contains for every song cycle the title with translation, the year of composition, the text source and its |uage, voice type (soprano, coloratura soprano, mezzo-soprano, tenor, baritone), and the number of movements.

Song cycles by Wilhelm Killmayer
Title	Translation	Year	Poems	Image poet	Language	Voice	Instrument(s)	Movements
Vier Canzonen nach Texten von Petrarca	Four Canzones on texts by Petrarch	1950	Petrarch		Italian	mixed choir a cappella		four
Rêveries	Dreams	1953	French		French	soprano	piano; percussion	five
Romanzen	Romances	1954	Lorca		German	soprano	piano; percussion	five
Drei Gesänge nach Hölderlin	Three chants after Hölderlin	1965	Hölderlin		German	baritone	piano	three
Tre Canti di Leopardi (1965)	Three songs by Leopardi	1965	Leopardi		Italian	baritone	orchestra	three
Blasons anatomiques du corps féminin		1968			French	soprano	Pierrot ensemble	six
Französisches Liederbuch	French song book	1979–1980			German	soprano; baritone	ensemble	nine
Hölderlin-Lieder (1)	Hölderlin Songs	1982–1985	late Hölderlin		German	tenor	piano or orchestra	19
Hölderlin-Lieder (2)	Hölderlin Songs	1983–1987	late Hölderlin		German	tenor	piano or orchestra	18
Hölderlin-Lieder (3)	Hölderlin Songs	1983–1991	late Hölderlin		German	tenor	piano	seven
Neun Lieder nach Gedichten von Peter Härtling	9 Songs to Poems from Peter Härtling	1993	Härtling		German	mezzo-soprano	piano	nine
Trakl-Lieder I	Trakl Songs	1993	Trakl		German	tenor	piano	eight
Huit Poésies de Mallarmé	Eight poems by Mallarmé	1993–1995	Mallarmé		French	coloratura soprano	piano	eight
Sappho-Lieder	Sappho Songs	1993–2008	Sappho		German	soprano	piano	15
Heine-Lieder	Heine Songs	1994–1995	Heine		German	tenor	piano	37
... wie in Welschland lau und blau ...		1995–1997	Eichendorff		German	men's chorus		eight
... was dem Herzen kaum bewusst ...			Eichendorff		German	men's chorus		eight
Schweigen und Kindheit	Silence and Childhood	1996	Trakl		German	tenor	piano	six
Mörike-Lieder	Mörike Songs	2003–2004	Mörike		German	tenor	piano	15

== Song cycles ==
=== Vier Canzonen nach Texten von Petrarca ===
The cycle, composed in 1950, sets four poems by Petrarch for mixed choir a cappella:

1. Nova Angeletta (Madrigal)
2. Occhi miei lassi (Ballade)
3. Perch` al viso d`amor (Madrigal)
4. Canzon s` al dolce loco (Canzone)

The whole lasts about 9 minutes. It was recorded in 2000 by chamber choir Josquin des Prèz under Uwe Witzel.

=== Rêveries ===
The cycle, composed in 1953, sets five old French poems for soprano, piano and percussion:

1. Rêveries (13th century)
2. Chanson de la mal mariée (15th century)
3. Du legier pleur à qui la lippe pent (Charles d'Orléans)
4. Lamento (Clément Marot)
5. Petit mercier, petit pannier (Charles d'Orleans)

The cycle takes about 13 minutes. It was first performed on 30 July 1953 in Bayreuth by Liselotte Ebnet with the composer as the pianist and Hermann Gschwendtner.

=== Romanzen ===
The cycle, also known as Lorca-Romanzen, was composed in 1954, setting five poems by Federico García Lorca, translated by Enrique Beck, for soprano, piano and percussion:

1. Ich singe nimmer das Lied
2. Reiterlied
3. Mein Mädchen ging an das Meer
4. Ghasel
5. Lamento

The duration of the work is about 15 minutes. It was first performed on 25 April 1953 in Chicago by Leontyne Price.

=== Blasons anatomiques du corps féminin ===
The cycle, composed in 1968, sets six French poems for soprano and the Pierrot ensemble. Overall duration is about a quarter of an hour.

1. Tetin refaict, plus blanc qu’un œuf (Clément Marot)
2. Ongle, qui tranches quand tu veux (Gilles d'Aurigny)
3. Alayne chaulde (anonymous)
4. Genoil sans os (Lancelot de Carle)
5. O doulce Main (Claude Chappuys)
6. O lieu solacieulx (anonymous)

It was first performed on 6 July 1968 in Munich by Joan Carroll, with the composer as the pianist. It was recorded, with the Sappho-Lieder and the Mörike-Lieder, in 2012 on the occasion of the composer's 85th birthday by members of the Musikhochschule München.

=== Drei Gesänge nach Hölderlin ===
The cycle, composed in 1965, sets three poems by Hölderlin for baritone and piano:

1. Dem Sonnengott
2. Des Morgens
3. Die Götter

It was first performed on 23 April 1968 at the Bayerische Akademie der Schönen Künste in Munich by Heinz Wilbrink and the composer.

=== Hölderlin-Lieder ===
A first cycle Hölderlin-Lieder, setting 19 poems from his late period, was composed between 1982 and 1985. A tenor voice is accompanied by piano or orchestra. The work lasts about 40 minutes. The orchestral version was premiered in Munich on 3 February 1986 by Peter Schreier with the Bayerisches Staatsorchester, conducted by Wolfgang Sawallisch. The piano version was first performed on 23 August 1989 as part of the festival Frankfurt Feste, by Christoph Prégardien and Siegfried Mauser.

A second cycle, setting 18 poems from his late period with the same scoring tenor voice, with a total duration of about 45 minutes, was composed between 1982 and 1985. The orchestral version was premiered at the Salzburg Festival on 14 August 1987 by Peter Schreier and the ORF-Symphonieorchester, conducted by Lothar Zagrosek. The piano version was first performed, with the first cycle, on 23 August 1989 by Prégardien and Mauser. The singer recorded in 2010 four songs of the second cycle, together with songs by Robert Schumann and Gustav Mahler titled Wanderer, in an arrangement for small ensemble by the composer. A reviewer notes that Killmayer "demonstrates a real affinity with the Romantic poet" and describes the arrangement as "highly attractive scores with their spare and finely wrought chamber accompaniments".

A third cycle, setting 7 poems from his late period for tenor and piano, lasting 21 minutes, was composed between 1983 and 1992. It was premiered in Vienna on 22 November 1991 Wien for Wien Modern by Prégardien and Mauser. It was recorded in 2017 by Markus Schäfer and Mauser, together with the two cycles after Trakl, in 2017, titled Sommersneige (Summer's End).

Prégardien and Mauser recorded all three cycles in 1992. A reviewer for Gramophone notes that Killmayer thought of the poet's last period as "possessed by a special 'understanding of reality'". He describes "moments of dissonance, and unusual textural dispositions", but generally focused "on simple chordal and melodic patterns, not to create an atmosphere of expressionistic anguish, but to suggest a calm, joyous acceptance of the inevitable".

=== Neun Lieder nach Gedichten von Peter Härtling ===
The cycle Neun Lieder nach Gedichten von Peter Härtling was composed in 1993, setting nine poems by the contemporary author Peter Härtling:

1. wissen
2. schmerz
3. kasper
4. Die Mörsinger Pappel
5. An meine andere Stimme
6. An ein Taubenpaar
7. murmelverse
8. kein rätsel
9. Auf ein Selbstbildnis von Carl Philipp Fohr

It was premiered at the Linden-Museum in Stuttgart on 27 November 1993 by Mitsuko Shirai and Hartmut Höll.

=== Trakl-Lieder ===
The cycle Trakl-Lieder was composed in 1993, setting eight poems by Trakl:

1. An Novalis (second version)
2. Sommer
3. Ein Winterabend (second version)
4. Sonja
5. Sommersneige
6. Im Frühling
7. In Schwesters Garten (second version)
8. Fragment 11

It was premiered in the Cologne Philharmonie on 1 December 1998 by Christoph Prégardien and Siegfried Mauser. It was recorded in 2017 by Markus Schäfer and Mauser, together with the third cycle of Hölderlin-Lieder and the second cycle based on Trakl, in 2017, titled Sommersneige (Summer's End) after the fifth movement.

=== Sappho-Lieder ===
The cycle Sappho-Lieder, based on 15 poems by Sappho, was composed between 1993 and 2008. The whole takes about half an hour to perform.

1. Sapphische Strophen
2. Fragment
3. Traumlied I
4. Abendstern, Hochzeitslicht
5. Faínetai
6. Der Apfel
7. Nachtlied
8. Traumlied II
9. Schlaflied
10. Rufe ich dich
11. Frühlingsbotin
12. Abschied
13. Eros
14. Hochzeitslieder
15. Sich erinnern

The cycle was premiered in the Linden-Museum in Stuttgart on 31 March 2008 by Mojca Erdmann and Siegfried Mauser. It was recorded, with the Blasons anatomiques du corps féminin and the Mörike-Lieder, in 2012 on the occasion of the composer's 85th birthday by members of the Musikhochschule München.

=== Heine-Lieder ===
The cycle Heine-Lieder was composed in 1994 and 1995, subtitled Ein Liederbuch nach Gedichten von Heinrich Heine (A songbook after poems by Heinrich Heine). Killmayer set 37 of his poems in four sections (Abteilung), for a total duration of about 80 minutes:

1. Ich hab im Traum ... (eight songs, including "Ich hab im Traum geweinet")
2. Das ist menschlich! (twelve songs)
3. Die alte Geschichte (ten songs including "Ein Jüngling liebt ein Mädchen")
4. Die Macht des Gesanges (seven songs including "Auf Flügeln des Gesanges")

Poems by Heine have been set to music by many composers, including Robert Schumann who composed in 1840 Dichterliebe on texts from Heine's Lyrisches Intermezzo, including also "Ich hab im Traum geweinet" and "Ein Jüngling liebt ein Mädchen". Killmayer observed a difference in the approach to setting Heine's poems:

Die Widersprüchlichkeit der Menschennatur entzückte ihn, die Ungradheit des Lebens und aller Erscheinungen liebte er. Während im 19. Jahrhundert fast nur die stimmungshaften, lyrischen Gedichte vertont wurden, hatte erst das 20. Jahrhundert die kompositorisch überzeugenden Mittel, Heines realistische Gedichte, die in ihrer Zeit einzigartig sind, mit Musik zu verbinden. Meine Auswahl versucht, die verschiedenen Charaktere und Formtypen, die Heine verwendet, nebeneinander zu stellen und so ein Bild seiner Persönlichkeit zu geben.

The contradictions in human nature delighted him; he loved the unevenness of life and all its manifestations. While 19-century musical settings focused almost exclusively on his atmospheric and lyrical poetry, it was not until the 20th century that adequate musical expression could be found for Heine's poetic realism, unique in its time. In this selection I have attempted to juxtapose the various personae and forms used by Heine so as to present a picture of his personality.

The composition was premiered at the Liederhalle in Stuttgart on 16 November 1995 by Christoph Prégardien and Siegfried Mauser, with the composer for recitation.

=== Schweigen und Kindheit ===
The cycle Schweigen und Kindheit was composed in 1993, setting six more poems by Trakl:

1. Sommer (Abend in Lans, first version)
2. Untergang (fifth version)
3. Elis (first version)
4. Herbstliche Heimkehr (first version)
5. Die Sonne
6. Am Hügel (Geistliche Dämmerung, first version)

It was premiered in Munich on 3 December 1996 by Sebastian Leebmann and Siegfried Mauser. It was recorded in 2017 by Markus Schäfer and Mauser, together with the third cycle of Hölderlin-Lieder and the first cycle based on Trakl, titled Sommersneige (Summer's End).

=== Mörike-Lieder ===
The cycle Mörike-Lieder was composed in 2003 and 2004, setting 15 poems by Eduard Mörike:

1. Er ist's
2. Denk es, o Seele!
3. Gesang Weylas
4. Ein Stündlein wohl vor Tag
5. Jägerlied
6. Septembermorgen
7. Schön-Rohtraut
8. Verborgenheit
9. Der Gärtner
10. Das verlassene Mägdlein
11. Mit einem Teller wilder Kastanien
12. Herr Dr. B. und der Dichter
13. Die traurige Krönung
14. Fußreise
15. Seufzer

The cycle was premiered at the Liederhalle in Stuttgart on 12 October 2004 by Christoph Prégardien and Siegfried Mauser. It was recorded, with the Blasons anatomiques du corps féminin and the Sappho-Lieder, in 2012 on the occasion of the composer's 85th birthday by members of the Musikhochschule München.
