= Claude Chappuys =

French poet

Claude Chappuys (c. 1500 – 17 November 1575) was a 16th-century French poet.

== Biography ==
Born in Amboise, Chappuys was a valet and librarian for François I, then secretary to cardinal du Bellay. He entered the priesthood and was appointed high dean of the Chapter of Rouen by the King. However, the Chapter refused to accept this nomination and he had to accept a post of great cantor of the Rouen Cathedral, which was later reduced to that of canon.

In addition to his court poems, he composed blasons, epigrams, epistles, and songs. He was linked to Mellin de Saint-Gelais and Marot, who considered him to be one of the good poets of his time; however, his name remained long forgotten.

He died in Rouen 17 November 1575.

== Works ==
- 1538: Panégyrique récité au très illustre et très chrestien roy Françoys premier de ce nom, à son retour de Provence, l'an mil cinq cens trente huit, au mois de septembre
- 1539: La Complaincte de Mars sur la venue de l'empereur en France,read online
- 1543: Discours de la Court, présenté au Roy par M. Claude Chappuys, son libraire et varlet de chambre ordinaire read online
- 1543: L'Aigle qui a faict la poulle devant le coq à Landrecy,read online (satirical poem against the emperor Charles V).
- 1545: Le Grand Hercule gallique qui combat contre deux, (verse piece to the praise of Francis 1.)
- 1549: Le Sacre & Couronnement du trèsauguste, trespuissant & treschrestien roy Henry deuxiesme de ce nom à Reims. Lan M D XLVII en juillet. Avec la harengue faicte au roy par monseigneur le cardinal de Guyse archevesque de Reims, & la response du roy
- 1550: Harangue au roi Henri II lorsque ce prince fit son entrée à Rouen en 1550.
- 1563: La Réduction du Hâvre de Grâce par le roy Charles, neufiesme de ce nom.

Modern editions

- 1932: Blasons: anatomiques du corps féminin, publiés par le bibliophile B. G., décorés de vignettes par Grès, Chartres: Les Parallèles read online
- 1967: Poésies intimes, critical edition by Aline Mary Best, Geneva: Droz, series Textes littéraires français

== Music ==
Wilhelm Killmayer set one of his poems in his song cycle Blasons anatomiques du corps féminin in 1968.

== Bibliography ==
- Louis P. Roche, Claude Chappuys, ?-1575 : poète de la cour de François 1er, thesis for the doctorate of University, presented at the Faculty of Arts of Poitiers, Paris : Les Belles Lettres, 1929

== Sources ==
- Louis-Gabriel Michaud, Biographie universelle ancienne et moderne, vol. VIII, 1813, (pp. 69).
- Précis analytique des travaux de l'Académie des sciences, belles-lettres de Rouen pendant l'année 1852-1853, Imprimerie Alfred Péron, Rouen, 1853, (pp. 457-458).
