= Giffard dirigible =

1852 airship built by French aviator Henri Giffard

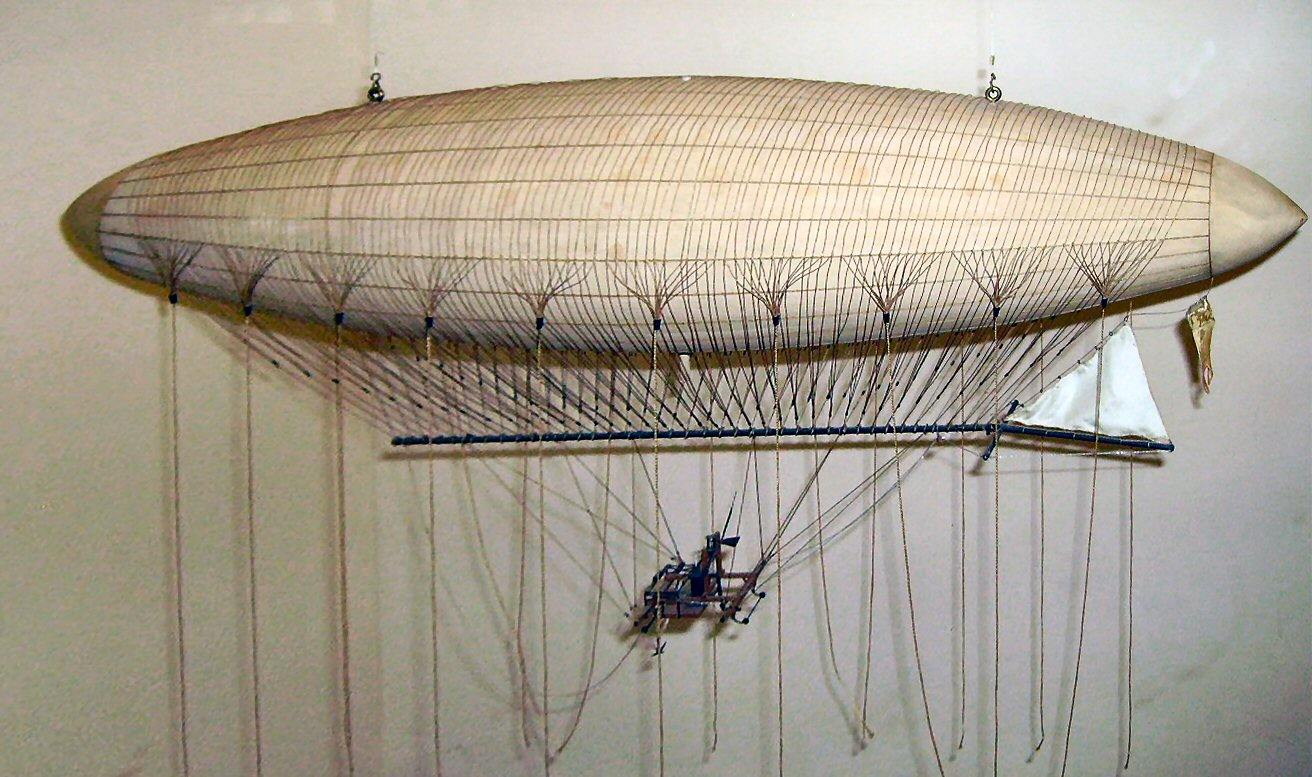
- A model of the Giffard airship at the London Science Museum

General information
- Type: Experimental airship
- National origin: France
- Manufacturer: Henri Giffard
- Designer: Henri Giffard
- Primary user: Henri Giffard
- Number built: 1

History
- First flight: 24 September 1852

The Giffard dirigible or Giffard airship was an airship built in France in 1852 by Henri Giffard, it was the first powered and steerable airship to fly. The craft featured an elongated hydrogen-filled envelope that tapered to a point at each end. From this was suspended a long beam with a triangular, sail-like rudder at its aft end, and beneath the beam a platform for the pilot and steam engine. Due to the highly flammable nature of the lifting gas, special precautions were taken to minimise the potential for the envelope to be ignited by the engine beneath it. The engine's exhaust was diverted downwards to a long pipe projecting below the platform, and the area surrounding the boiler's stoke hole was surrounded by wire gauze. On 24 September 1852, Giffard flew the airship from the hippodrome at Place de l'Etoile to Élancourt, covering the 27 km (17 mi) in around 3 hours, demonstrating maneuvering along the way. The engine, however, was not sufficiently powerful to allow Giffard to fly against the wind to make a return journey.

== Specifications ==
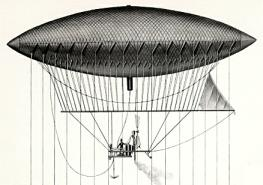

General characteristics

- Crew: One pilot
- Length: 44.00 m (143 ft 0 in)
- Volume: 3,200 m^{3} (113,000 cu ft)
- Powerplant: 1 × steam engine , 2.0 kW (3.0 hp) the engine weighed 113kg (250lb) not including the boiler

Performance

- Maximum speed: 9.0 km/h (6.0 mph, 5.2 kn)
- Range: 27 km (17 mi, 15 nmi)

== Bibliography ==
- Henri Giffard, « De la force dépensée pour obtenir un point d'appui dans l'air calme, au moyen de l'hélice. », Bulletin de la société Aérostatique et Météorologique de France (May 1853), Paris Gauthier-Villars 1853 in Collection de mémoires sur la locomotion aérienne sans ballons published by Gustave Ponton d'Amécourt, Gauthier-Villars, 1864, 58–62
