= Lionel de La Laurencie =

French musicologist

- Born: 24 July 1861; Nantes, France
- Died: 27 April 1930 (aged 68); Paris, France
- Occupation: Musicologist

Lionel de La Laurencie (24 July 1861 – 21 November 1933) was a French musicologist and first president of the 1917 founded Société française de musicologie (French association of musicologists) from 1917 to 1920 and from 1931 to 1933.

== Biography ==
Graduated major of the French National School of Forestry, de La Laurencie devoted himself to music from 1898.

He studied at the University of Grenoble then in Nancy. A skilful violinist, he deepened his musical knowledge with Léon Reynier, master of violin, and enrolled at the Conservatoire de Paris where he was a student of Bourgault-Ducoudray in the classes of harmony and history of music of the latter.

He taught history of music at the école des hautes études en sciences sociales and wrote for the most notable French musical magazines.

He led the journal Société française de musicologie and participated to the Encyclopédie de musique et dictionnaire du Conservatoire under the direction of Albert Lavignac.

de La Laurencie was Alain de Sédouy's grandfather on the maternal side.

== Selected publications ==
- 1888: La légende de Parsifal et le drame musical de Richard Wagner.
- 1890: España,Read on Gallica
- 1906: L'Académie de musique et le concert de Nantes.
- 1908: Rameau.
- 1911: Lully.
- 1912: Deux imitateurs des bouffons.
- 1920: Les Créateurs de l'opéra français.
- 1934: Orphée de Gluck.
