= Jacques Buot =

Jacques Bu[h]ot (before 1623 – January 1678) was a French mathematician, engineer, physicist, and astronomer. He worked on the constructions of forts and compiled a mathematics textbook apart from being one of the first seven mathematician members of the Royal Academy of Sciences.

Buot was born in L’Aigle, Orne, and nothing is known of his early life. He worked as a gunsmith early in life. He then worked in Paris as an engineer in the forts along with Pierre Petit and Jean Ballesdens. While in Paris he wrote on the use of proportional wheels in 1647, published by Melchoir Mondière. He was then appointed ordinary royal engineer from around 1648. He made observations on the solar eclipse of 8 April 1652 along with Jacques-Alexandre le Tenneur and Adrien Auzout. He made a chart of sky for the King which includes the 1665 comet that he observed along with Adrien Auzout. He constructed a sundial in the royal library as well as at the castle of Saint-Germain-en-Laye. In 1666 he was among the first seven mathematicians included in the Royal Academy of Sciences. He examined the inclination of Saturn's rings in 1667. Along with Cassini and other he observed the Great Red Spot on Jupiter and determined the period of Jupiter's rotation as 9 hours and 56 minutes. He devised an azimuthal square that would help identify the longitude without the need for measurements at noon which was later constructed along with Claude Antoine Couplet who also married Buot's step daughter Marie Baillot.

He married Simone Rousseau on November 11, 1655. He is thought to have died around January 1678 since Philippe de la Hire was appointed as his substitute at the Academy.
