= Philippe de La Hire =

French painter and architect (1640–1718)

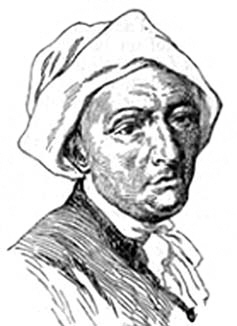
- Philippe de La Hire
- Born: 18 March 1640; Paris
- Died: 21 April 1718 (aged 78)
- Scientific career
- Fields: Mathematics, astronomy, architecture

Philippe de La Hire (or Lahire, La Hyre or Phillipe de La Hire) (18 March 1640 – 21 April 1718) was a French painter, mathematician, astronomer, and architect. According to Bernard le Bovier de Fontenelle, he was an "academy unto himself".

He was born in Paris, the son of Laurent de La Hire, a distinguished artist, and Marguerite Coquin. In 1660, he moved to Venice for four years to study painting. Upon his return to Paris, he became a disciple of Girard Desargues from whom he learned geometrical perspective and was received as a master painter on 4 August 1670. His paintings have sometimes been confused with those of his son, Jean Nicolas de La Hire, who was a doctor as well as a painter.

He also began to study science and showed an aptitude for mathematics. He was taught by the French Jesuit theologian, mathematician, physicist and controversialist Honoré Fabri and became part of a circle formed by Fabri which included Giovanni Domenico Cassini, Claude François Milliet Dechales, Christiaan Huygens and his brother Constantijn, Gottfried Leibniz, René Descartes and Marin Mersenne. He became a member of French Academy of Sciences in 1678, upon the death of Jacques Buot, and subsequently became active as an astronomer, calculating tables of the movements of the Sun, Moon, and planets and designing contrivances for aiming aerial telescopes. From 1679–1682 he made several observations and measurements of the French coastline, and in 1683 aided in mapping France by extending the Paris meridian to the north. In 1683 La Hire assumed the chair of mathematics at the Collège Royal. From 1687 onwards, he taught at the Académie d’architecture.

La Hire wrote on graphical methods, 1673; on conic sections, 1685; a treatise on epicycloids, 1694; one on roulettes, 1702; and, lastly, another on conchoids, 1708. His works on conic sections and epicycloids were based on the teaching of Desargues, of whom he was the favourite pupil. He also translated the essay of Manuel Moschopulus on magic squares, and collected many of the theorems on them which were previously known; this was published in 1705. He also published a set of astronomical tables in 1702. La Hire's work also extended to descriptive zoology, the study of respiration, and physiological optics.

Two of his sons were also notable for their scientific achievements: Gabriel-Philippe de La Hire, (1677–1719), mathematician, and Jean-Nicolas de La Hire (1685–1727), botanist.

Mons La Hire, a mountain on the Moon, is named for him.

On 19 December 1699, he presented ‘Expériences et observations sur les corps qui frottent l’un contre l’autre’ (Experiments and observations on bodies that slide against each other) at the Académie Royale des Sciences in Paris, where he proposed what are now commonly known as Amontons’ laws of friction after Guillaume Amontons.

== Selected works ==
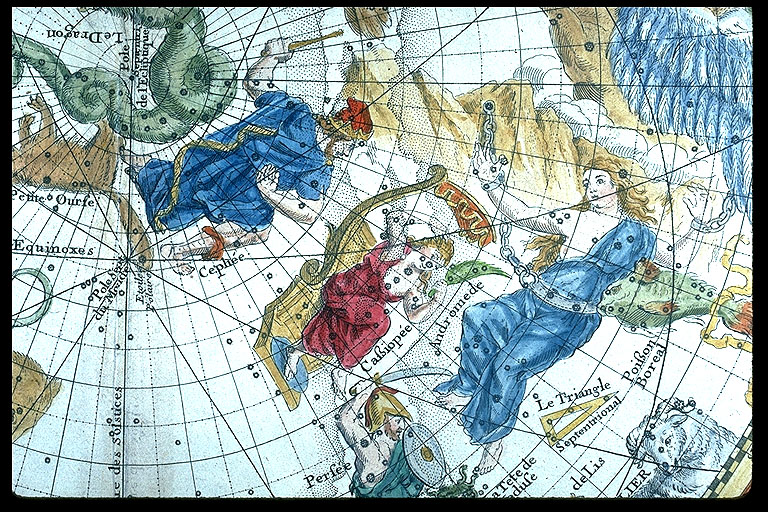
Andromeda and Cassiopeia, detail from Planisphère céleste (1705).

Unless otherwise stated, La Hire's works are in French.

- Nouvelle méthode en géométrie pour les sections des superficies coniques et cylindriques (1673) (New geometrical method for the sections of conical and cylindrical areas)
- Nouveaux éléments des sections coniques: Les lieux géométriques: Les constructions ou effections des équations (1679)
- La gnomonique ou l'Art de faire des cadrans au soleil (1682) (Gnomonics or the Art of making sundials.)
- Sectiones conicæ (1685) (Conic sections.) (in Latin)
- Tables du Soleil et de la Lune (1687) (Tables of the Sun and of the Moon)
- L'ecole des arpenteurs (1689; on line: 4th ed., 1732)
- Traité de mecanique: ou l'on explique tout ce qui est nécessaire dans la pratique des arts, & les propriétés des corps pesants lesquelles ont un plus grand usage dans la physique (1695)
- Tabulae astronomicae (in Latin). Paris: Jean Boudot. 1702.
- Planisphère céleste (1705)
- "Des conchoïdes en général". In: Histoire de l'Académie royale des sciences, p. 32 of the memoirs section (1708)
- Tabulæ astronomicæ Ludovici Magni iussu et munificentia exaratæ et in lucem editæ (1727) (in Latin)
- Tables astronomiques dressées et mises en lumiere par les ordres et par la magnificence de Louis le Grand (1735)

== Bibliography ==
- Chareix, Fabien (2008). "La Hire, Philippe de", vol. 2, pp. 662–664, in The Dictionary of Seventeenth-Century French Philosophers, edited by Luc Foisneau. London: Continuum. ISBN 9780826418616.
