= Jacques d'Allonville =

French astronomer and mathematician (1671–1732)

Jacques Eugène d'Allonville de Louville (14 July 1671 – 10 September 1732) was a French astronomer and mathematician. He also went by the name of Chevalier de Louville (Knight of Louville).

== Early life and education ==
Louville's father (1628–1707) was the lord of Louville. His mother (1646–1704) was born a Vaultier de Moyencourt. His family had a higher social rank.

As the youngest son, Jacques Louville was destined to the church; the other choices were a military career or another path which would not offend his elders. When he was questioned about the tonsure at age 7, he attended the ceremony and firmly declared that he would not be ecclesiastic.

== Military career ==
Louville was the youngest in the French Royal Navy. He fought in the Battle of La Hougue in 1692, and became an army captain at the end of 1700. His older brother Charles Auguste, who served with Philip V, brought him there. He was nominated to be a brigadier and his services were recognised with a pension.

When he returned to France, he resumed his service. He became a prisoner of war in 1708 at the Battle of Oudenarde and was held for two years. Once he was released he became Colonel of the Dragons of The Queen army and was paid by the king. He later returned to the study of astronomy. He cut ties with the army and against the wishes of his family, returning his officer certificate and renouncing his appointments.

== Scientific career ==
He devoted his time to mathematics and the principle of astronomy. Louville went to Marseille in 1713 or 1714, to measure the height of the pole needed to properly tie his observations of the stars to the observations of Pythéas (a Greek astronomer and explorer), made 2000 years earlier. In 1715, Louville went to London to observe a total solar eclipse, assisting Edmund Halley. The men saw on the dark surface of the Moon jets of light that lasted for an instant and passed. They resembled flashes (fulminations). In 1717 he situated himself in Carré a mile from Orléans. He had been a member of the Academy of Sciences since 1714 and the Academy had a residency obligation. The situation was not a regular occurrence. But Louville promised to communicate to the school annually, kept his promise and continued to study the sky in Orléans.

== Contributions ==
Louville concluded in his measurements taken during his stay in Marseille ( watching the same stars that Pythéas had observed in the same city five centuries ago and those of other astronomers for century's had also observed) that the tilt on the axis of earth was not constant all the time. Voltaire was the witness after the other enlargement of time scales given by the work of Louville.

"This astronomer in 1714 went to Marseille to observe the eclipse as it had been set by Pythéas approximately 2000 years before; he found in less than 20 minutes, it is to say in 2000 years, the eclipse, according to him it was approaching the equator by 3 degrees ( its assumed). Besides the movements he knew the sun would have another movement where it would turn on itself from one pole to another. This finding showed that in 23000 years the sun will be directed towards the equator and that in 2 million years all the climates around the world under the torrid zones and under the glacier zones will change” (Voltaire)

Louville's thesis, explained mathematically by Euler, and accepted today, had a considerable echo but he was still challenged by other scientists. La Hire and Riccioli were reluctant. The observations from ancient Greeks, Arab-Muslim, ancient Chinese and the west search to add ideas.

The crater Louville on the Moon is named after him.

== Bibliography ==
- Observations sur l'obliquité de l'écliptique, 1714
- Nouvelles tables du soleil, 1720
- Nouvelle méthode de calculer les éclipses, 1724
- Remarques sur la question des forces vives, 1721–28.

== See also ==
- List of French astronomers
