= Mairan (crater) =

Crater on the Moon

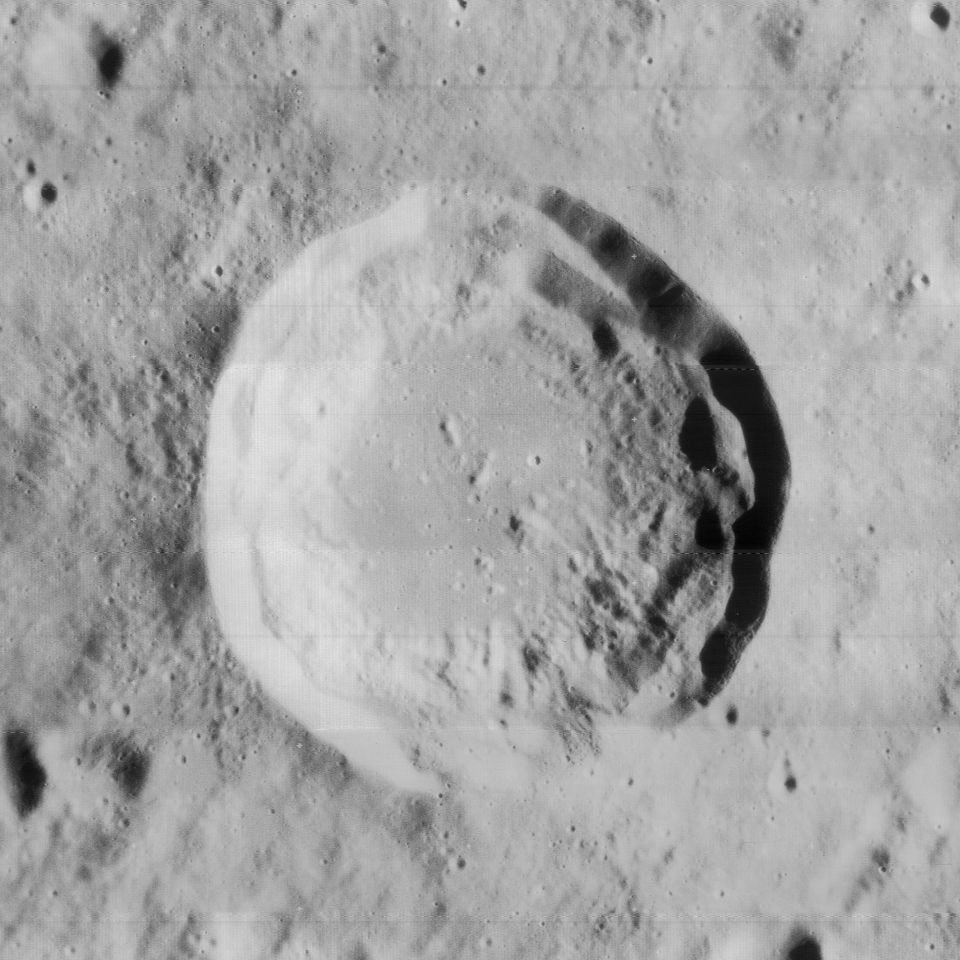
- Lunar Orbiter 4 image
- Coordinates: 41.6°N 43.4°W
- Diameter: 40 km
- Depth: 3.4 km
- Colongitude: 44° at sunrise
- Formation: Upper Imbrian
- Eponym: Jean J. d'Ortous de Mairan

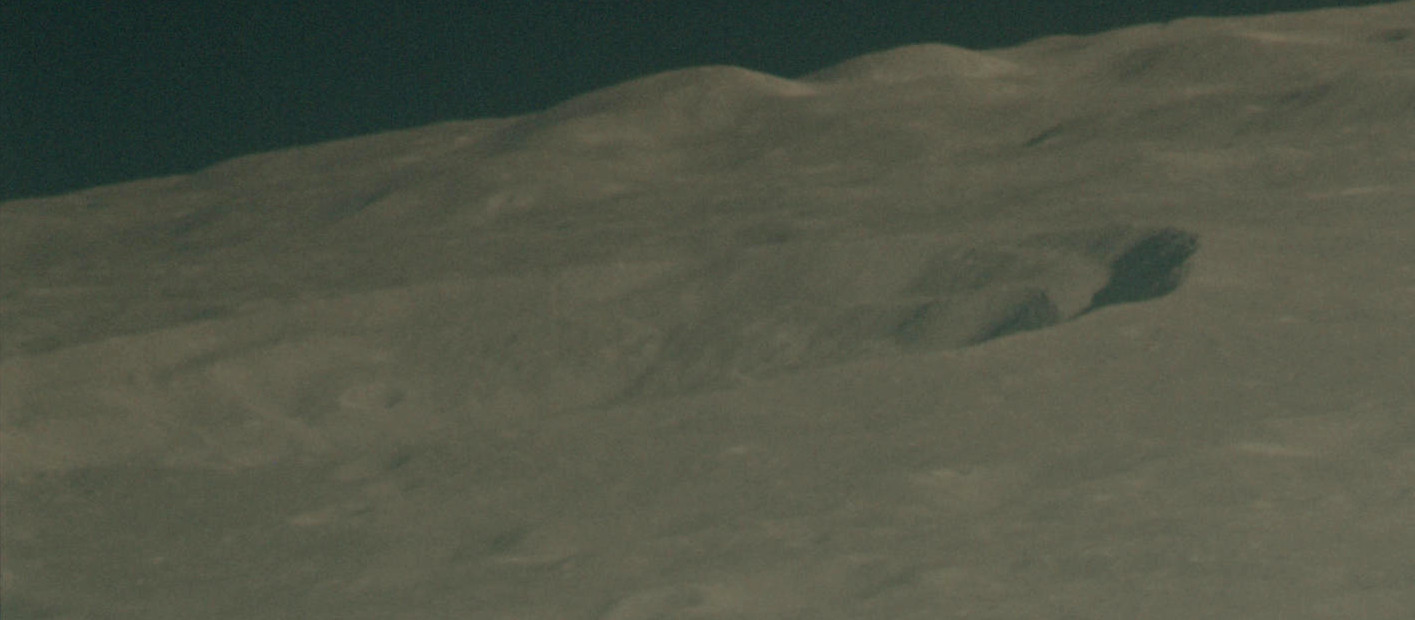
Oblique view from Apollo 15

Mairan is a lunar impact crater that is located on a highland peninsula between Oceanus Procellarum to the west and Mare Imbrium to the east. To the north-northeast is the comparably sized crater Sharp. Northwest of Mairan is the heavily eroded Louville.

The outer rim of Mairan has not been significantly eroded or impacted, and retains a sharp edge. The surface around Mairan is rough and irregular, with a multitude of many tiny craters, particularly to the south and west. The inner walls display some terracing, and flow down to a relatively flat interior floor.

Mairan is a crater of Upper (Late) Imbrian age.

== Mairan domes ==
The volcanic complex, known as Mairan Hills or Mairan Domes, is composed of Mairan T together with three satellite domes (Mairan Northwest, Mairan Middle, and Mairan South). It was formed by two volcanic episodes 3.75±0.1 and 3.35±0.2 billion years ago, extruding a viscous silicic lava simultaneously with basalt eruptions in nearby mare. Most of volcanic complex, except for dome summits, is now buried under mare surface.

In the mare, due west of Mairan, is a small lunar dome designated Mairan T with 3.8 km wide depression at the summit (in official IAU nomenclature "Mairan T" name refers only to the depression), believed to be a caldera The width of hill is about 7 km, and height is about 800 m. It is one of four unusually steep (with slopes reaching 22-27 degrees) and bright domes in area which are thought to be formed by very viscous, high-Si lava.

The composition of domes is changing from the north to south, with Mairan Northwest composed of pyroxenes with 30% quartz admixture, while Mairan South dome composed of nearly pure quartz, with extremely high thorium concentration of 83±19 ppm.

== Rima Mairan ==
There is a sinuous rille along the southwest edge of the highland peninsula containing Mairan. It is designated Rima Mairan, and follows a north–south course for a length of about 100 kilometers.

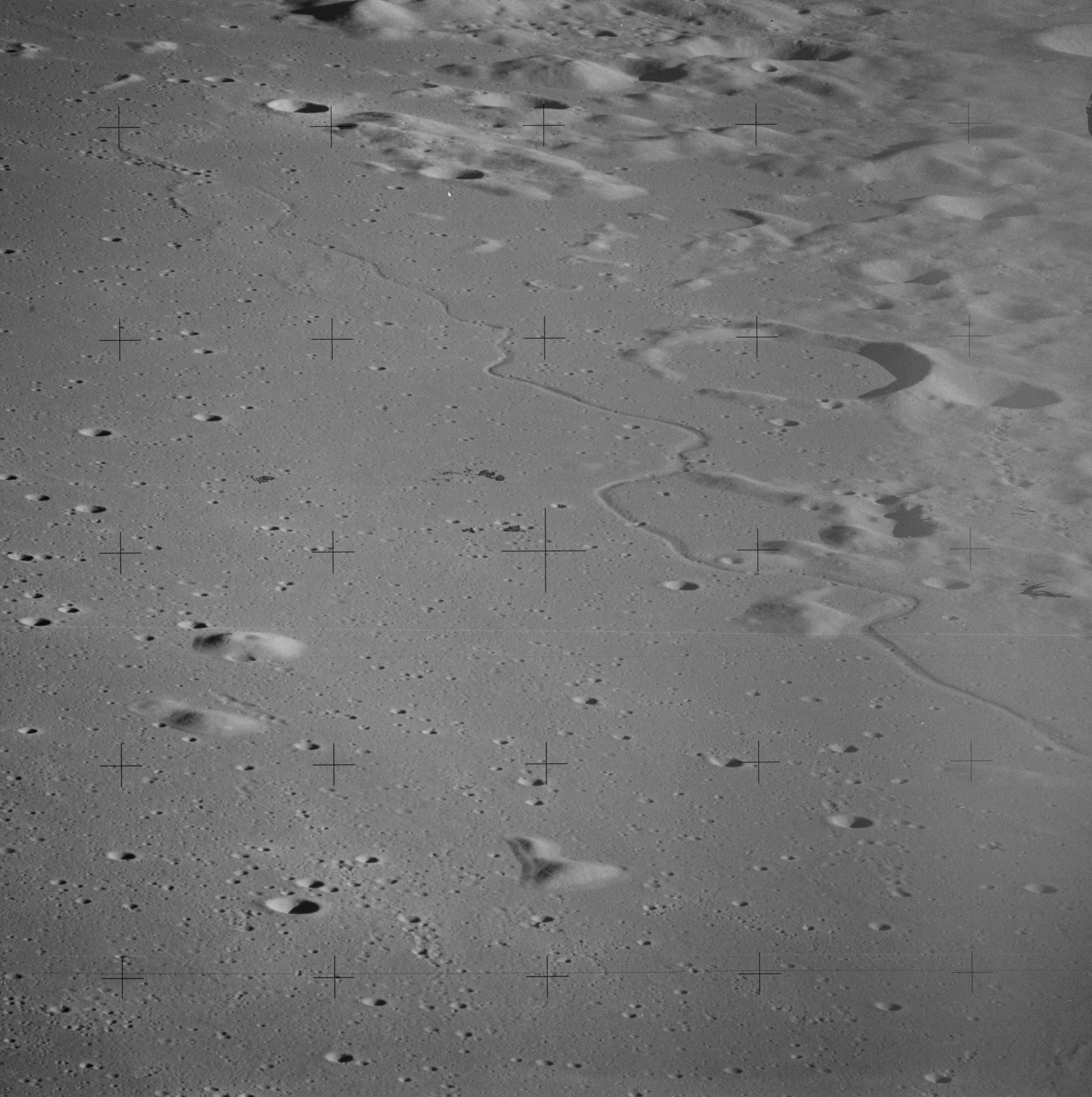
Oblique view of part of Rima Mairan, from Apollo 15

== Satellite craters ==
By convention these features are identified on lunar maps by placing the letter on the side of the crater midpoint that is closest to Mairan.

Mairan	Latitude	Longitude	Diameter
A	38.6° N	38.8° W	16 km
C	38.6° N	46.0° W	7 km
D	40.9° N	45.4° W	10 km
E	37.8° N	37.2° W	6 km
F	40.3° N	45.1° W	9 km
G	40.9° N	50.8° W	6 km
H	39.3° N	40.0° W	5 km
K	40.8° N	41.0° W	6 km
L	39.0° N	43.2° W	6 km
N	39.2° N	45.5° W	6 km
T	41.7° N	48.3° W	3 km
Y	42.7° N	44.0° W	7 km

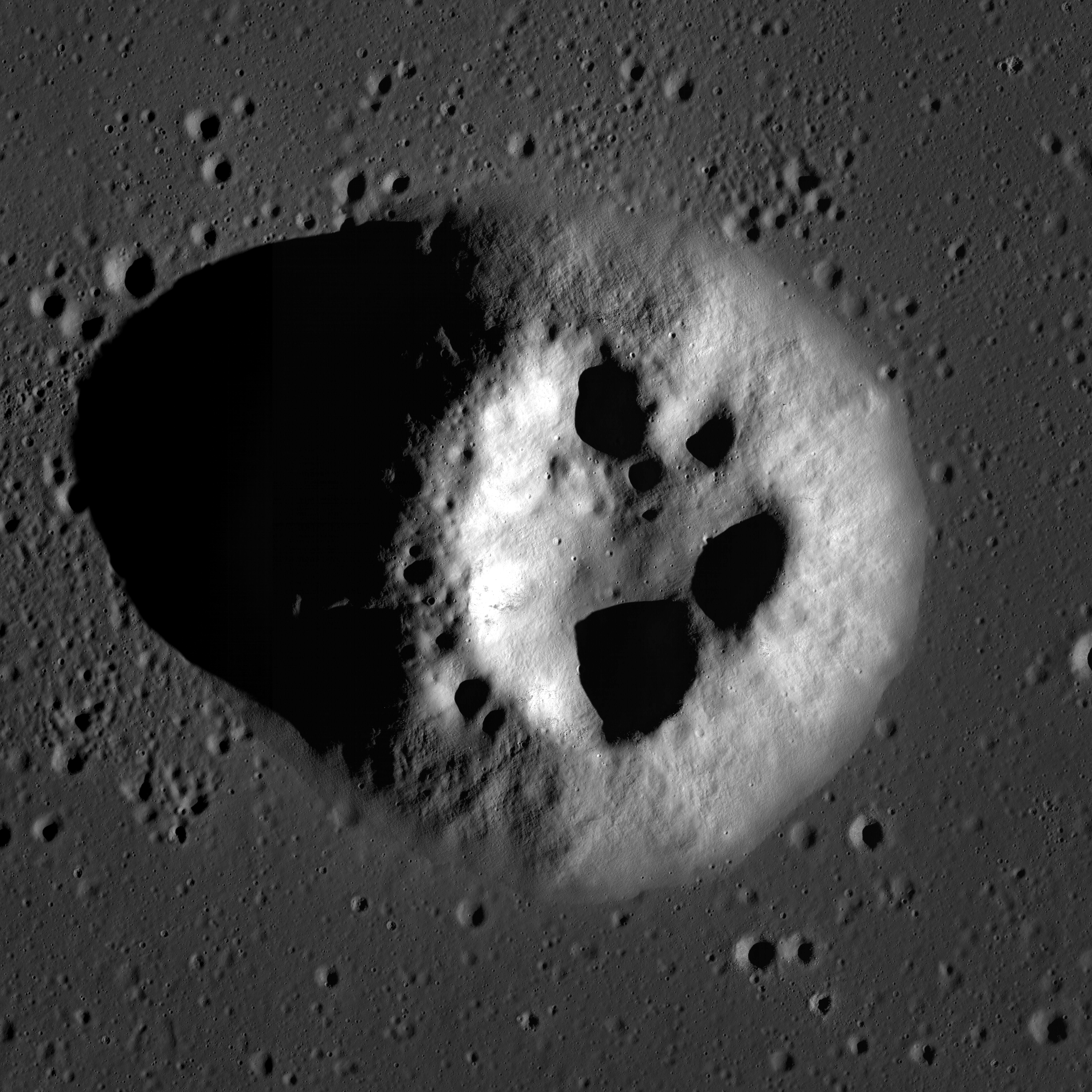
Lunar dome Mairan T

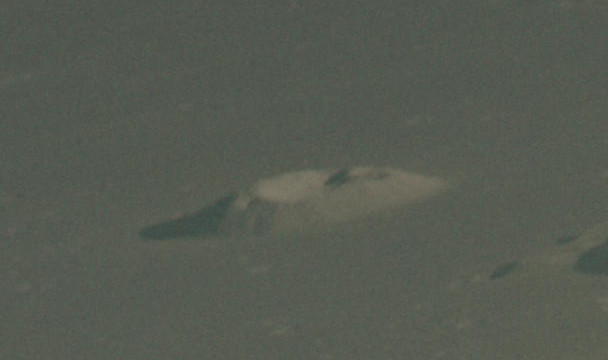
Mairan T from Apollo 15
