= Junije Palmotić =

Croatian writer (1606–1657)

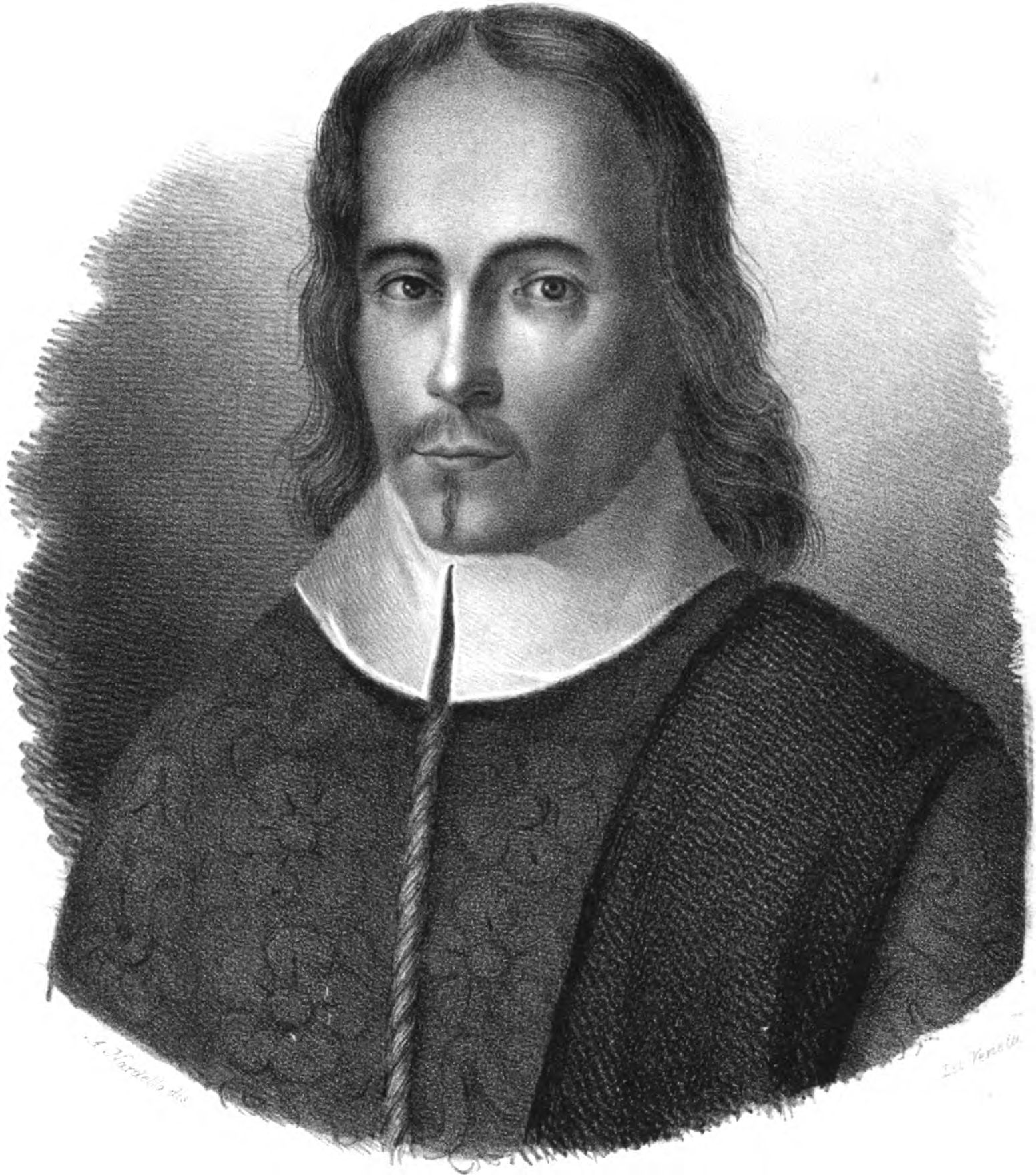
- Born: 1606; Dubrovnik, Republic of Ragusa (now Dubrovnik, Croatia)
- Died: 1657 (aged 50–51); Dubrovnik, Republic of Ragusa
- Other name: Junius Palmotta
- Occupations: writer, poet and dramatist
- Notable work: Pavlimir; Captislava; Bisernica; Danica; Kristijada

Junije (Džono) Palmotić, (also Giunio in Italian or Junius Palmotta in Latin) (1606 – 1657) was a Croatian baroque writer, poet and dramatist from the Republic of Ragusa. He was a member of the Palmotić noble family.

== Early life ==
Palmotić was born in 1606 in Ragusa (Dubrovnik, now Croatia), the son of Juraj Palmotić (Giorgio Palmotta) and Ursula née Gradić (Orsola Gradi). His parents belonged to the notable patrician families of Palmotić and Gradić (Gradi in Italian), respectively. Through his mother, he was related to Ivan Gundulić. He had an older brother Džore and younger Ivan, who died young in his childhood.

== Education ==
Little is known about his schooling, but he may have attended city school as it was mandatory for male nobles. It is known that he attended a private school opened in 1619 by the Jesuits and whose lecturers included, in the next few generations, Ivan Gradić, Ignjat Tudišević, Marin Gundulić, Ivan Dražić and Bartol Kašić. As Palmotić's teachers in that school, Stjepan Gradić especially mentions Ignjat Tudišević and a Sienese Italian, Camillo Gori.

== Career ==
Aged 18, he became a member of the Great Council in the Republic of Ragusa. He began to write while still young, writing in continuation of the tradition of Ivan Gundulić inspired by Ovid, Virgil, Tasso and Ariosto. Although influenced by the Latin literary tradition, Palmotić wrote in his native Croatian language, as well as translating libretti from Italian. He also translated the Christias di Girolamo Vida, the Christiade, an 'Illyrian' poem in 24 verses, that was posthumously published in Rome in 1670.

Although his poetry was melodramatic and dealt primarily with mythological topics, his drama focused on contemporary Dubrovnik, particularly the life of the aristocracy. In one of his songs he demonstrates his knowledge of the Serbian epic poetry mentioning its heroes, as well as Hungarian and Albanian ones, like: Lazar of Serbia, Miloš Obilić, Skanderbeg, Sekula, Mihajlo Svilojević, Vuk Grgurević and John Hunyadi.

His nephew Stjepan Gradić, ambassador and Vatican librarian, wrote about his life, supplying precious material to future biographers. Alongside Vinko Pribojević and Juraj Križanić, he was an early pioneer of the ideas of Slavic unity.

== Legacy ==
All the works of Palmotić were published by the end of the 19th century by the Croatian Cultural Association.

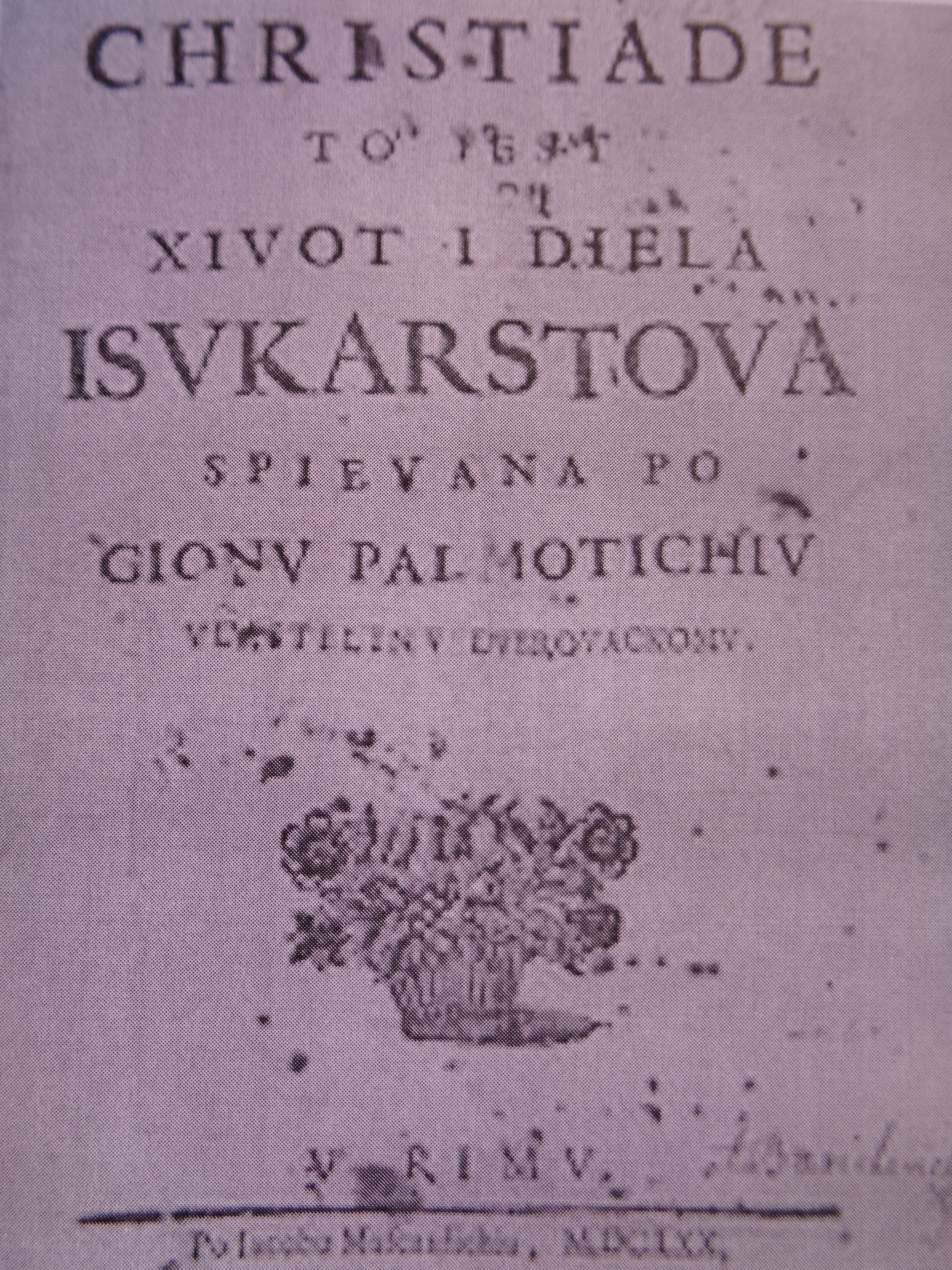
Cover of Christiade published in Rome in 1670

Streets in Dubrovnik, Zagreb, Belgrade, Petrovaradin, Subotica and Niš bear his name.

== Works ==
Palmotić's notable works include:

- Pavlimir, drama. Narratives connected with the founding of Dubrovnik inspired his Pavlimir. This is a sort of Ragusan "Aeneid," Pavlimir corresponding to Aeneas. He comes from abroad, founds the city of Dubrovnik, marries the beautiful Margareta, whom he discovers there, and becomes otac slovenskog naroda (the father of the Slavonic people).
  - Milčetić, Ivan, ed. (1890). Pavlimir: Drama Gjona Gjora Palmotića (in Serbo-Croatian). Zagreb: Dionička tiskara.
- Captislava, drama. The main character is the daughter of the King of Captat (Cavtat or Epidaurum). She is in love with the Hungarian prince, Gradimir, but the father wants her to marry a Serbian prince. A nymph helps her in this cabal, and she elopes with the Hungarian prince, while her sister marries the Serbian prince. Chief roles are played by ghosts and nymphs.
- Bisernica, drama. It is virtually the continuation of the Captislava, and almost all important roles are played by vilenice (nymphs) and vilenici (dragons).
- Danica, drama. A dramatized episode from Ariosto's "Orlando Furioso" (IV-VI), transplanted and acclimatized to the Bosnian and Ragusan soil. Danica is the enslaved daughter of the Bosnian king, Ostoja. She was saved by the Ragusan knight Matijas, who later became the ban of Croatia. Some motifs of this play are akin to Shakespeare's comedy Much Ado About Nothing.
- Christiade ("dedicated to the queen Cristina from Sweden", Croatian: Kristijada) A copy is found in the Vatican Library.
- Atalanta, opera with music by Lambert Courtoys the Younger (1629)

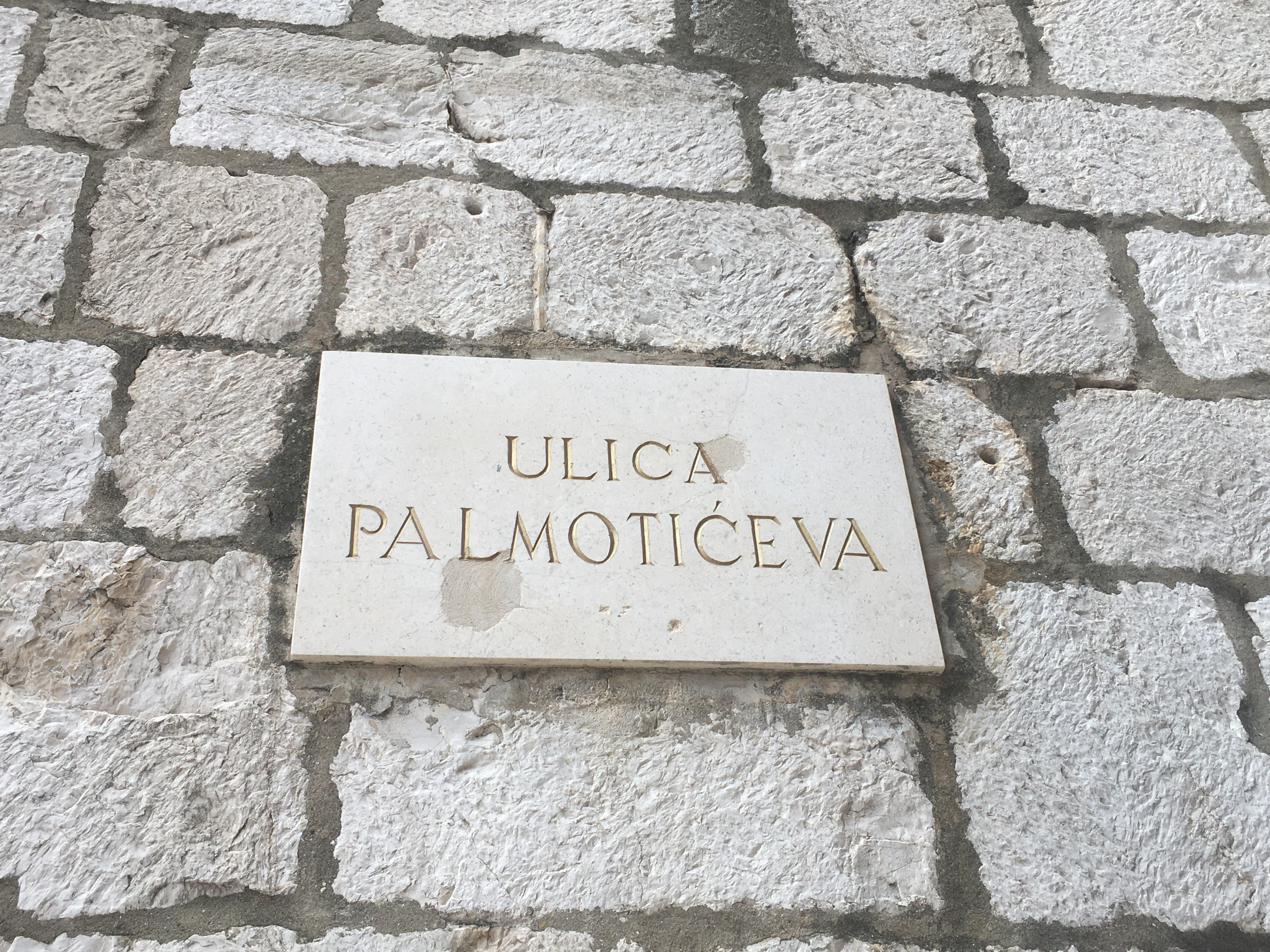
Junije Palmotić street in Dubrovnik

In addition to his four important dramas (Pavlimir, Danica, Bisernica and Captislava) in which Palmotta celebrated the exploits of Slavic heroes, he wrote several imitations based on Latin and Italian sources. Thus the material for his Allina was taken from Ariosto, and for the Armida from Tasso. The mythological play Atalanta is based on Ovid's "Metamorphoses" (bk. X).

== Annotations ==
1. In Latin, his name was Iunius Palmotta. In Christiade, he spelt his own name Gion Palmotich (PO GIONV PALMOTICHIV) in Slavic using Latin orthography. In Christiade and Panegyris, he spelt it Iunius Palmotta (IVNII PALMOTTÆ, DE PALMOTTA) in Latin. Ardelio Della Bella (1655–1737), Francesco Maria Appendini (1768–1837), Girolamo Da Rio (1769-1827), Francesco Cusani (1802–1879) and William Frederick Wingfield spelt his name "Giugno Palmotta". In the Italian language Galleria di ragusei illustri (1841) his given name is spelt "Giugno" and "Giunio". In Croatian, his given name is Junije or Džono, while the archaic spelling is Gjon(o).

== Sources ==
- Appendini, Francesco M. (1803). Notizie istorico-critiche sulle antichità, storia e letteratura de' Ragusei: divise in due tomi e dedicate all'eccelso Senato della Republica di Ragusa. Martecchini. pp. 235–.
- Milčetić, Ivan (1912). "Palmotićeva "Kristijada" u Vatikanskoj kńižnici" [Palmotić's "Kristijada" in the Vatican Library]. Građa za povijest književnosti hrvatske (in Serbo-Croatian). 7: 307–312.
- Bogišić, Rafo, ed. (1995). "Ljetopis Junija Palmotića". Junije Palmotić, Izabrana djela. Stoljeća hrvatske književnosti. Zagreb: Matica hrvatska. pp. 33–41.
