= Sharp (crater) =

Crater on the Moon

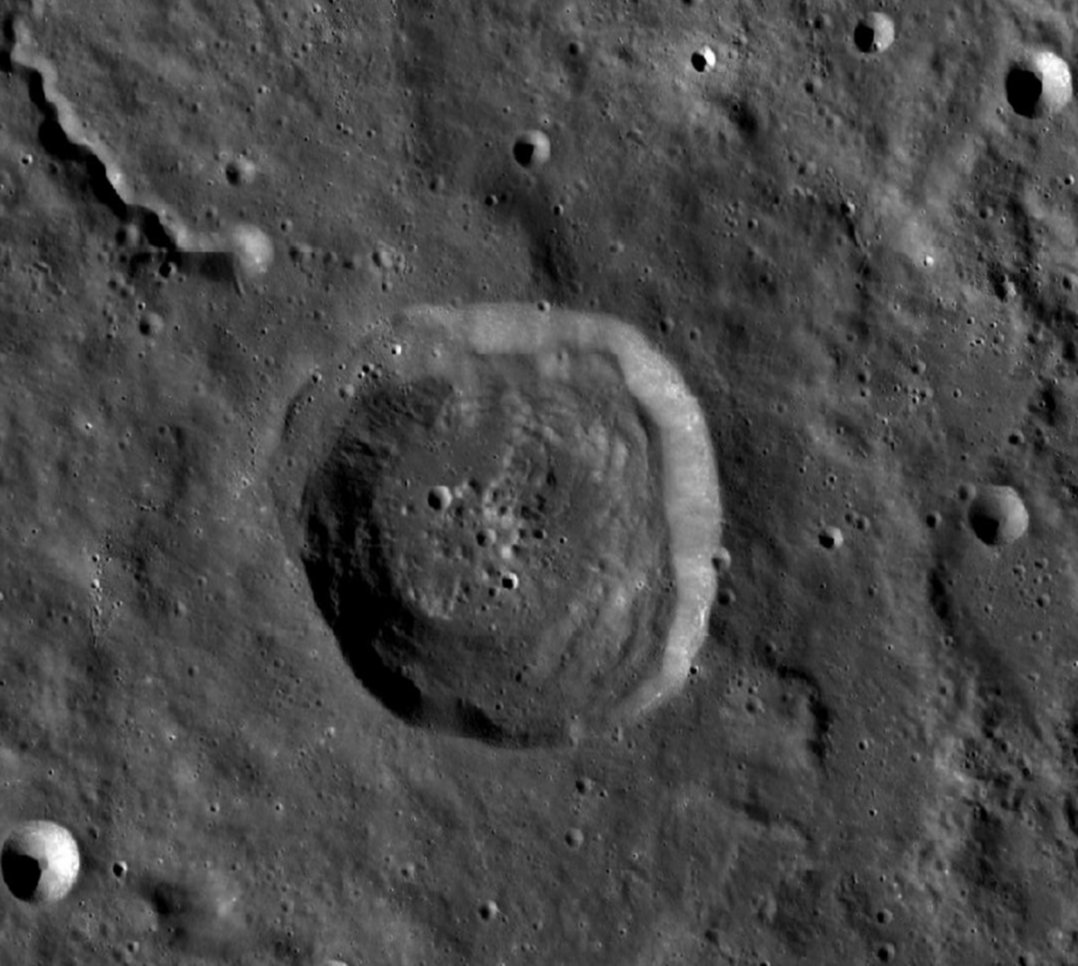
- LRO image
- Coordinates: 45.7°N 40.2°W
- Diameter: 40 km
- Depth: 3.2 km
- Colongitude: 40° at sunrise
- Formation: Upper Imbrian
- Eponym: Abraham Sharp

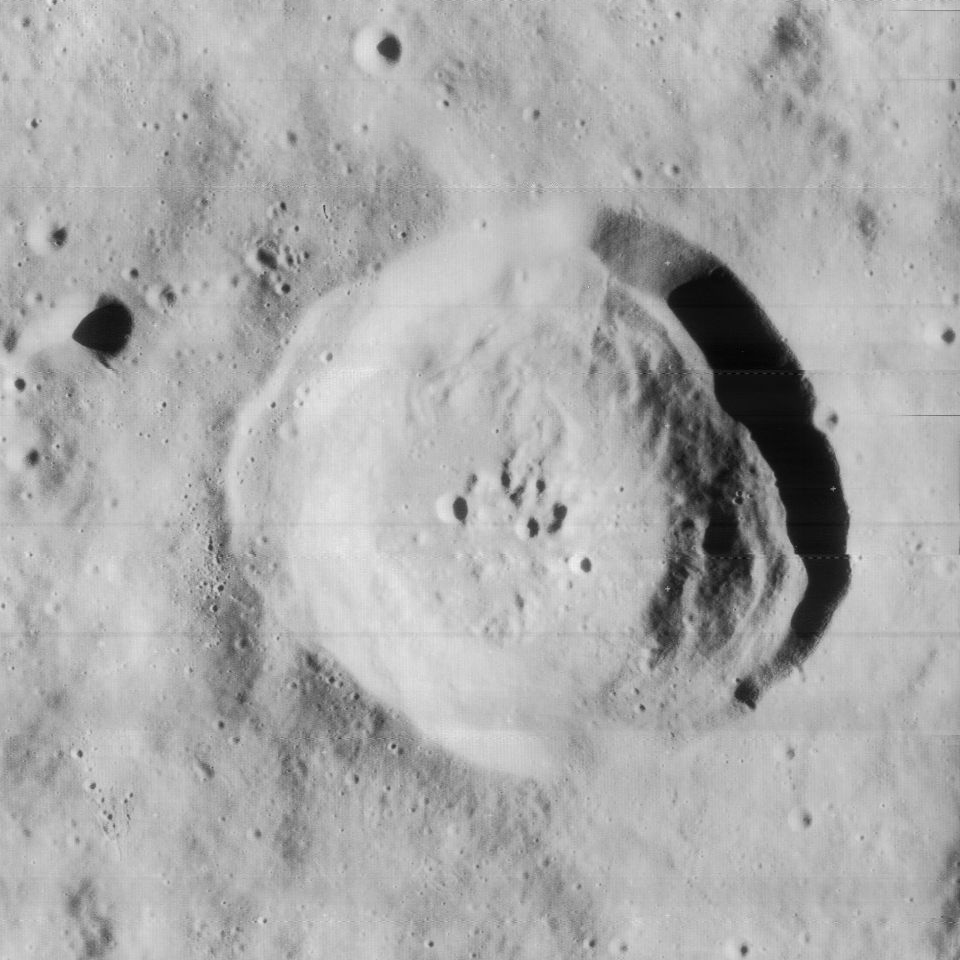
Lunar Orbiter 4 image

Sharp is a lunar impact crater located to the west of the Sinus Iridum bay of the Mare Imbrium, beyond the Montes Jura range. To the southwest is the crater Mairan. Because of its location and foreshortening, Sharp appears elliptical from the earth.

Sharp is surrounded by a rugged region of mountains and rises. Ridges are joined to the north and south ends of the rim. The crater has a low central peak at the midpoint of the floor. Between Sharp and Sharp A is an unnamed sinuous rille. The more distant Rima Sharp is located on the Mare Frigoris to the northwest.

Sharp is a crater of Upper (Late) Imbrian age.

== Sharp during full moon ==
Sharp is somewhat difficult to locate during full moon. Bright satellite craters Sharp A and Sharp B, both northwest of Sharp itself, are eye catchers near the border of the most western section of Mare Frigoris. The brightness of both Sharp A and Sharp B was captured on the photographic version of chart LAC 23 (page 46) in The Clementine Atlas of the Moon (Ben Bussey / Paul D. Spudis). Satellite crater Sharp B was called Aymat by Hugh Percy Wilkins and Patrick Moore. This name is still seen on the Swiss Hallwag moonmap created by Hans Schwarzenbach.

== Satellite craters ==
By convention these features are identified on lunar maps by placing the letter on the side of the crater midpoint that is closest to Sharp.

| Sharp | Latitude | Longitude | Diameter |
|---|---|---|---|
| A | 47.6° N | 42.6° W | 17 km |
| B | 47.0° N | 45.3° W | 21 km |
| D | 44.8° N | 42.1° W | 8 km |
| J | 46.9° N | 37.9° W | 6 km |
| K | 47.4° N | 38.5° W | 5 km |
| L | 45.8° N | 38.2° W | 6 km |
| M | 47.3° N | 41.4° W | 4 km |
| U | 47.4° N | 48.6° W | 6 km |
| V | 46.2° N | 46.9° W | 7 km |
| W | 50.2° N | 45.3° W | 4 km |
