= Mersenne's laws =

Laws describing the frequency of oscillation of a stretched string

A string half the length (1/2), four times the tension (4), or one-quarter the mass per length (1/4) is an octave higher (2/1). If the tension on a string is ten lbs., it must be increased to 40 lbs. for a pitch an octave higher.

A string, tied at A, is kept in tension by W, a suspended weight, and two bridges, B and the movable bridge C, while D is a freely moving wheel; all allowing one to demonstrate Mersenne's laws regarding tension and length.

Mersenne's laws are laws describing the frequency of oscillation of a stretched string or monochord, useful in musical tuning and musical instrument construction.

== Overview ==
The equation was first proposed by French mathematician and music theorist Marin Mersenne in his 1636 work Harmonie universelle. Mersenne's laws govern the construction and operation of string instruments, such as pianos and harps, which must accommodate the total tension force required to keep the strings at the proper pitch. Lower strings are thicker, thus having a greater mass per length. They typically have lower tension. Guitars are a familiar exception to this: string tensions are similar, for playability, so lower string pitch is largely achieved with increased mass per length. (Note: Mass is typically added by increasing cross-section area. This increases the string's force constant (k). Higher k doesn't affect pitch per se, but fretting a string stretches it in addition to shortening it, and the pitch increase due to stretching is larger for higher k values. Thus intonation requires more compensation for lower strings, and (markedly) for steel vs nylon. This effect still applies to strings where mass is increased with windings, albeit to a lesser extent, because the core that supports string tension generally needs to be larger to support larger masses of winding.) Higher-pitched strings typically are thinner, have higher tension, and may be shorter. "This result does not differ substantially from Galileo's, yet it is rightly known as Mersenne's law," because Mersenne physically proved their truth through experiments (while Galileo considered their proof impossible). "Mersenne investigated and refined these relationships by experiment but did not himself originate them". Though his theories are correct, his measurements are not very exact, and his calculations were greatly improved by Joseph Sauveur (1653–1716) through the use of acoustic beats and metronomes.

== Equations ==
The natural frequency is:

- a) Inversely proportional to the length of the string (the law of Pythagoras),
- b) Proportional to the square root of the stretching force, and
- c) Inversely proportional to the square root of the mass per length.

$f_0 \propto \tfrac{1}{L}.$ (equation 26)

$f_0 \propto \sqrt{F}.$ (equation 27)

$f_0 \propto \frac{1}{\sqrt{\mu}}.$ (equation 28)

Thus, for example, all other properties of the string being equal, to make the note one octave higher (2/1) one would need either to decrease its length by half (1/2), to increase the tension to the square (4), or to decrease its mass per length by the inverse square (1/4).

Harmonics	Length,	Tension,	or Mass
1	1	1	1
2	1/2 = 0.5	2² = 4	1/2² = 0.25
3	1/3 = 0.3̅3̅	3² = 9	1/3² = 0.1̅1̅
4	1/4 = 0.25	4² = 16	1/4² = 0.0625
8	1/8 = 0.125	8² = 64	1/8² = 0.015625

These laws are derived from Mersenne's equation 22:

$$f_0 = \frac{\nu}{\lambda} = \frac{1}{2L}\sqrt{\frac{F}{\mu}}.$$

The formula for the fundamental frequency is:

$$f_0=\frac{1}{2L}\sqrt{\frac{F}{\mu}},$$

where f is the frequency, L is the length, F is the force and μ is the mass per length.

Similar laws were not developed for pipes and wind instruments at the same time since Mersenne's laws predate the conception of wind instrument pitch being dependent on longitudinal waves rather than "percussion".

== See also ==
- Cycloid
- Long-string instrument
- Overtone
- Standing wave
