= Junije =

- Gender: masculine
- Language: Serbian and Croatian

Origin
- Origin: June
- Region of origin: Dubrovnik

Other names
- Variant form: Giunio

Junije (Serbian Cyrillic: Јуније) is a masculine Serbian and Croatian given name derived from June. The Latin language version of this name is Junius while Italian version is Giunio. Croatian surname Žunjević, disappeared in the meantime, was based on Junije origin.

People

- Junije Palmotić (?1606 - 1657) was a Ragusan baroque writer, poet and dramatist
- Giunio Resti, also known as Junije Rastić, (1755-1814), Ragusan politician and writer

== See also ==
- Giunio
