= Rima Sharp =

Rille on the Moon

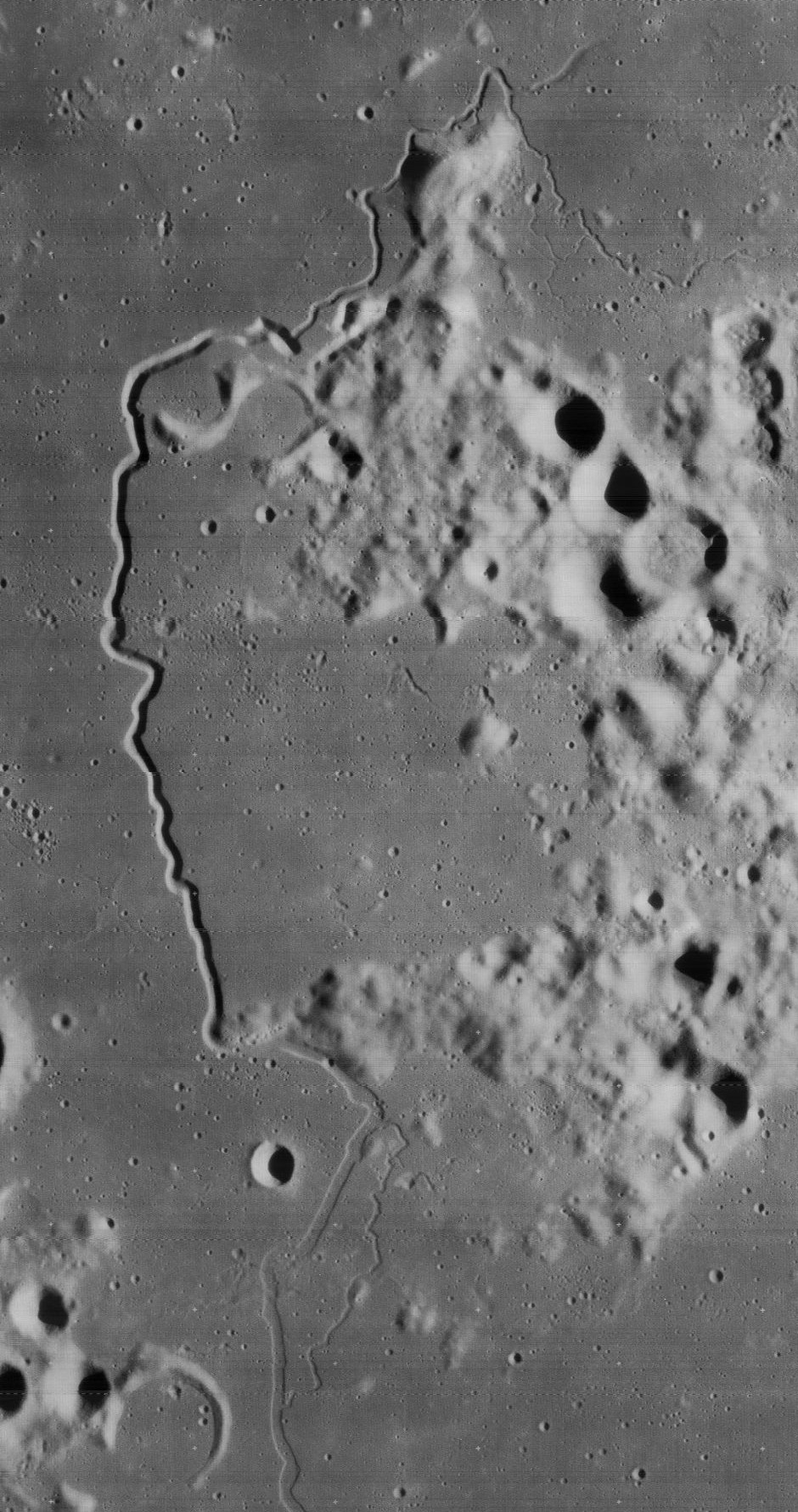
View of Rima Sharp from Lunar Orbiter 4

Rima Sharp is a sinuous rille on the moon, centered on selenographic coordinates 46.02°N 50.36°W. The name of the feature was approved by the IAU in 1964. It is named after the nearby crater Sharp.
