= Stjepan Gradić =

Ragusan philosopher and scientist (1613–1683)

Reverend Stjepan Gradić
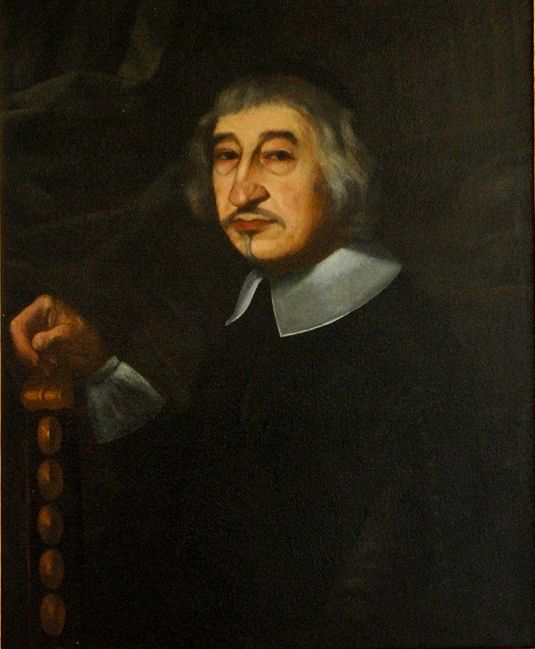
- Born: March 6, 1613; Dubrovnik, Republic of Ragusa, (modern-day Croatia)
- Died: 2 May 1683 (aged 70); Rome, Papal States
- Resting place: San Girolamo degli Illirici
- Occupations: Catholic priest, philosopher, philologist, scientist, diplomat, poet, librarian
- Parent(s): Michele Gradi and Maria Gradi (née Benessa)

Academic background
- Education: Roman College; Collegio Clementino; University of Bologna
- Influences: Benedetto Castelli; Bonaventura Cavalieri

Academic work
- Discipline: Classical scholar, mathematician
- School or tradition: Aristotelianism; Scholasticism
- Institutions: Vatican Library
- Influenced: Roger Joseph Boscovich

Stjepan Gradić, also known as Stefano Gradi (Latin: Stephanus Gradius; 6 March 1613 – 2 May 1683) was a polymath, philosopher, scientist and a patrician of the Republic of Ragusa.

== Biography ==
Stijepo's parents were Miho Gradi (Gradić) and Marija Benessa (Beneša). He was born in Ragusa (Dubrovnik), Republic of Ragusa, where he was first schooled. He moved to Rome by the order of his uncle, a vicar general of Ragusa, Petar Benessa. In Rome and in Bologna he studied philosophy, theology, law and mathematics. His mathematics professor in Rome was Bonaventura Cavalieri and in Bologna his mathematics professor was Benedetto Castelli. He became a priest in 1643, the year he returned home and soon became abbot of the Benedictine abbey of St. Cosmas and Damian on the island of Pašman, canon of cathedral choir in Ragusa and Ragusan deputy Archbishop. After a private trip to Rome he remained there until his death as the official diplomatic representative of the Republic of Ragusa to the Holy See. Since 1682 he was the head of the Vatican Library.

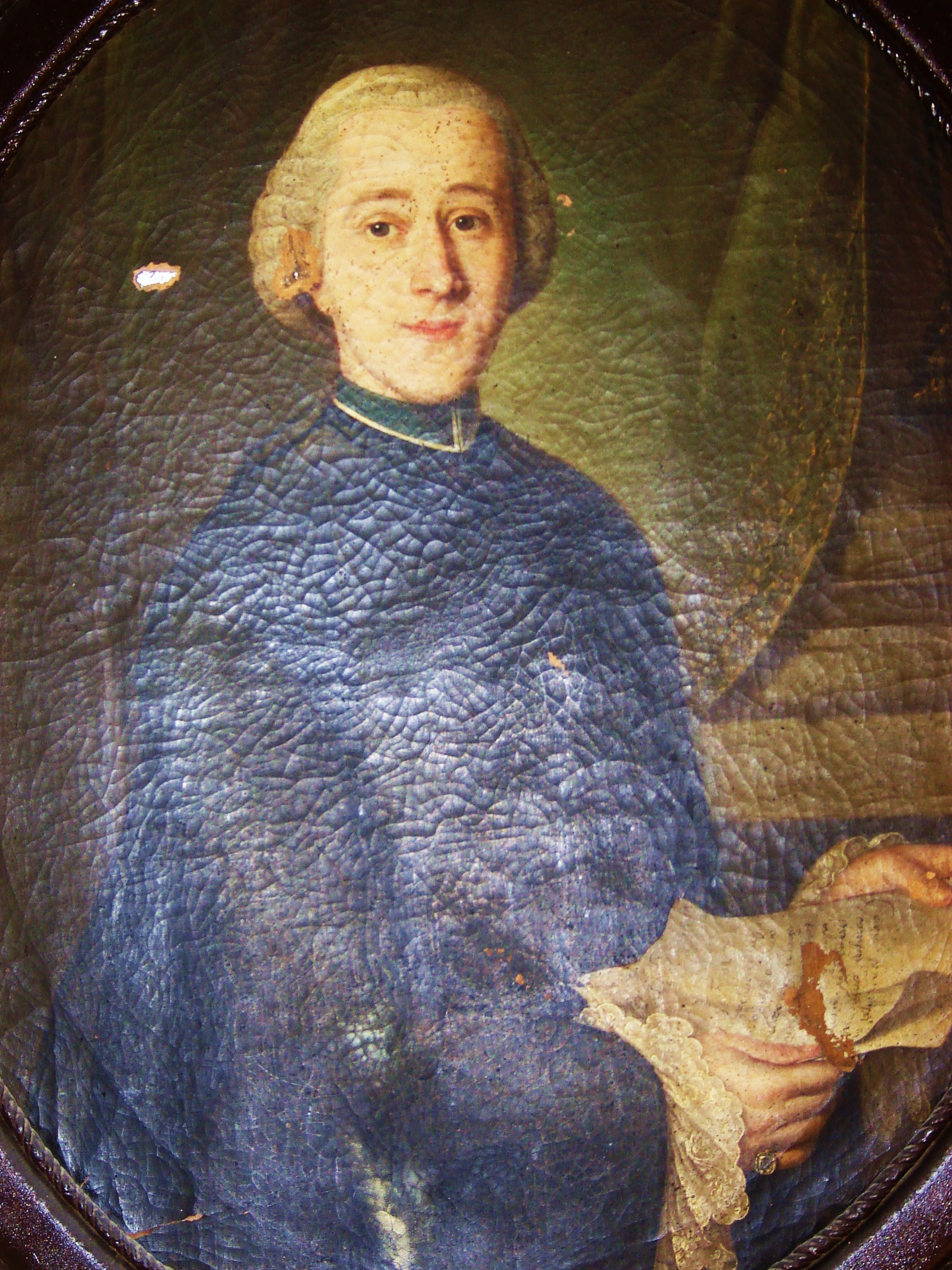
Stjepan Gradić

Gradić was a polymath. He cooperated with the historian Joannes Lucius in defending the honor and reputation of their native country of unjust attacks of some Italian and French writers, translated classical authors, wrote a biography of the Ragusan writer Junije Palmotić and a poem about the earthquake in Ragusa. In the literary and scientific circle of pope Alexander VII and Queen Christina of Sweden Gradić discussed scientific and philosophical issues.

His philosophical works are written in the spirit of Aristotelianism and scholasticism. Gradić was a member of the Royal Academy in Padua, having correspondence with many notable Europeans. He described the disastrous earthquake in Ragusa in 1667 in Latin verses and organized help from all over Europe for the devastated city.

Along with philosophy, he engaged in mathematics, physics, astronomy, literature and diplomacy. In mathematics, he dealt with Galileo's paradox. This work went unnoticed and was even unknown to Roger Joseph Boscovich who was a professor of mathematics at the Collegium Romanum where a century before Gradić had been an alumnus. In his only printed mathematical treatise De loco Galilaei quo punctum lineae aequale pronuntiat published in the collection Dissertationes physico-mathematicae quatuor he disputed the concept of indivisible and developed a series of ideas en route to infinitesimal method. He was solving many mathematical problems which are left in his own inheritance and correspondence with other mathematicians as well, including those of Ghetaldus such as the first problem from Ghetaldus' work Apollonius redivivus. In scientific correspondence with Giovanni Alfonso Borelli and Honoré Fabri he published works dealing with the natural causes of motion and the laws of acceleration and falling bodies. He wrote on the problem of true and apparent position of the polar star.

== See also ==
- List of notable Ragusans
- Dalmatia
- House of Gradić
