= Louville =

Crater on the Moon

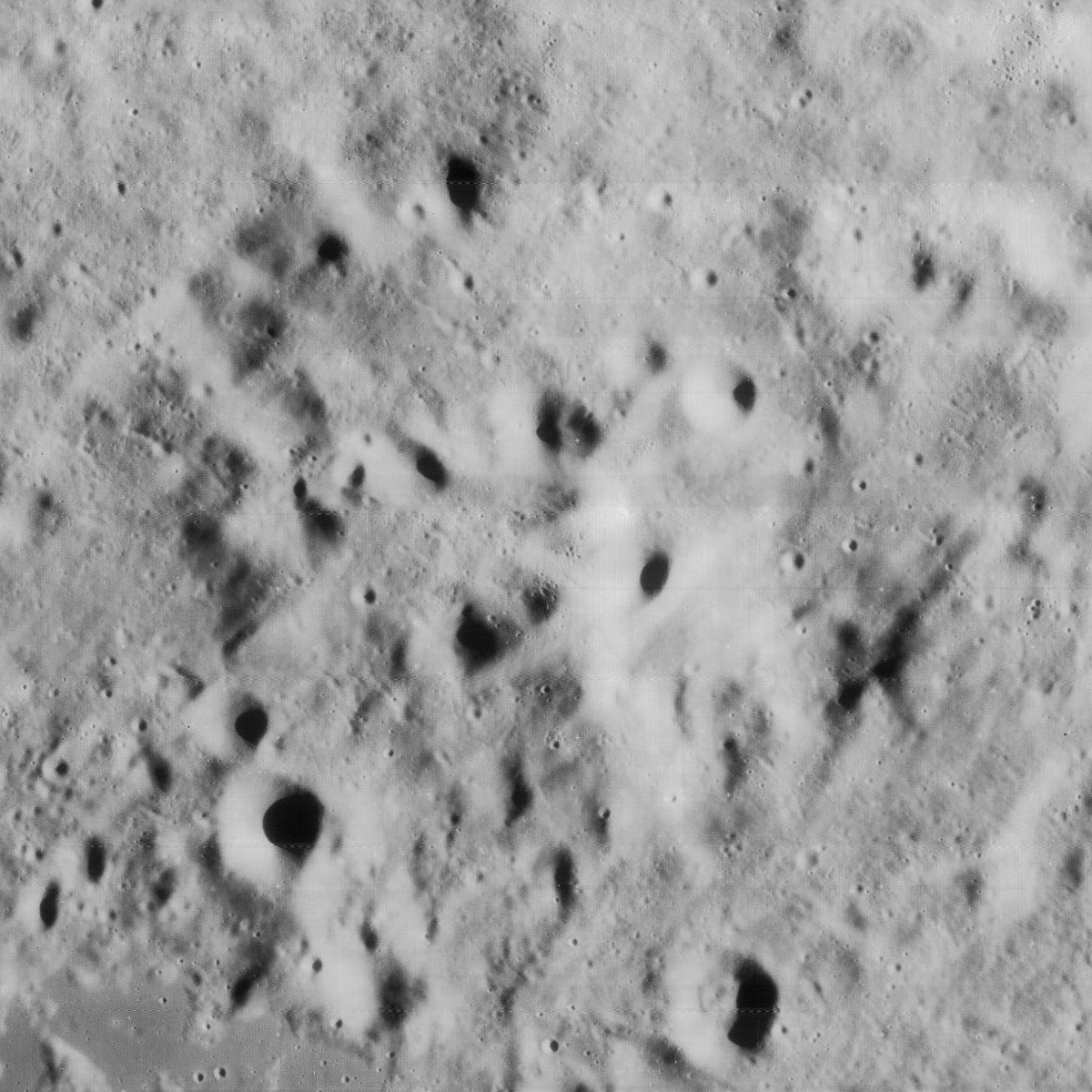
- Lunar Orbiter 4 image
- Coordinates: 44.0°N 46.0°W
- Diameter: 36 km
- Depth: 1.0 km
- Colongitude: 46° at sunrise
- Eponym: Jacques E. D'Allonville

Louville is a lunar impact crater that is located on the western edge of the Sinus Roris, a bay in the northern part of the Oceanus Procellarum. It lies to the northwest of the crater Mairan, on a triangular section of continental terrain to the west of Sinus Iridum and the Mare Imbrium.

This crater formation has been heavily eroded by impacts, to the point where the surface is somewhat difficult to distinguish from the surrounding rugged terrain to the east. It is now an irregular depression in the surface, with worn, uneven features. The small crater Louville B lies along the western rim, while Louville A lies just to the southeast.

To the west across the lunar mare is a long, slender rille designated Rima Sharp. This follows a generally north–south route, beginning to the north-northwest of Louville and continuing until it terminates to the south-southwest. The total diameter of this formation is 107 km.

== Satellite craters ==
By convention these features are identified on lunar maps by placing the letter on the side of the crater midpoint that is closest to Louville.

Louville	Latitude	Longitude	Diameter
A	43.2° N	45.3° W	8 km
B	44.0° N	46.5° W	8 km
D	46.9° N	52.1° W	7 km
Da	46.6° N	51.7° W	11 km
E	43.1° N	45.9° W	6 km
K	46.8° N	55.2° W	5 km
P	45.6° N	52.2° W	7 km

Louville DA is a concentric (double-walled) crater.

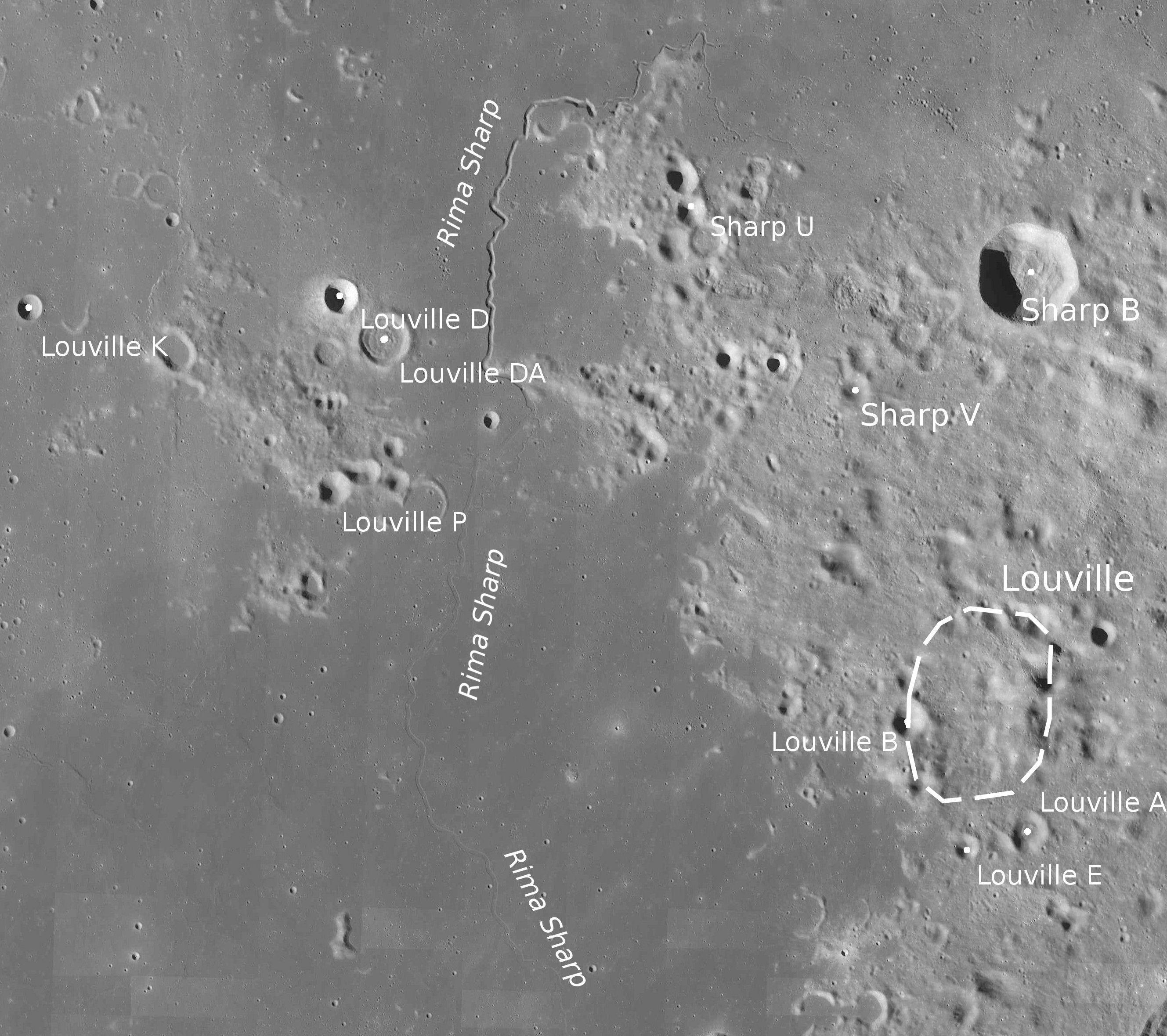
Rima Sharp and crater Louville with satellite features mosaic from the LRO. Unmarked on the bottom left: Louville ω hill (Louville Omega), nearest geological formation to the Chang'e 5 landing site.
