= Oizé =

- Commune
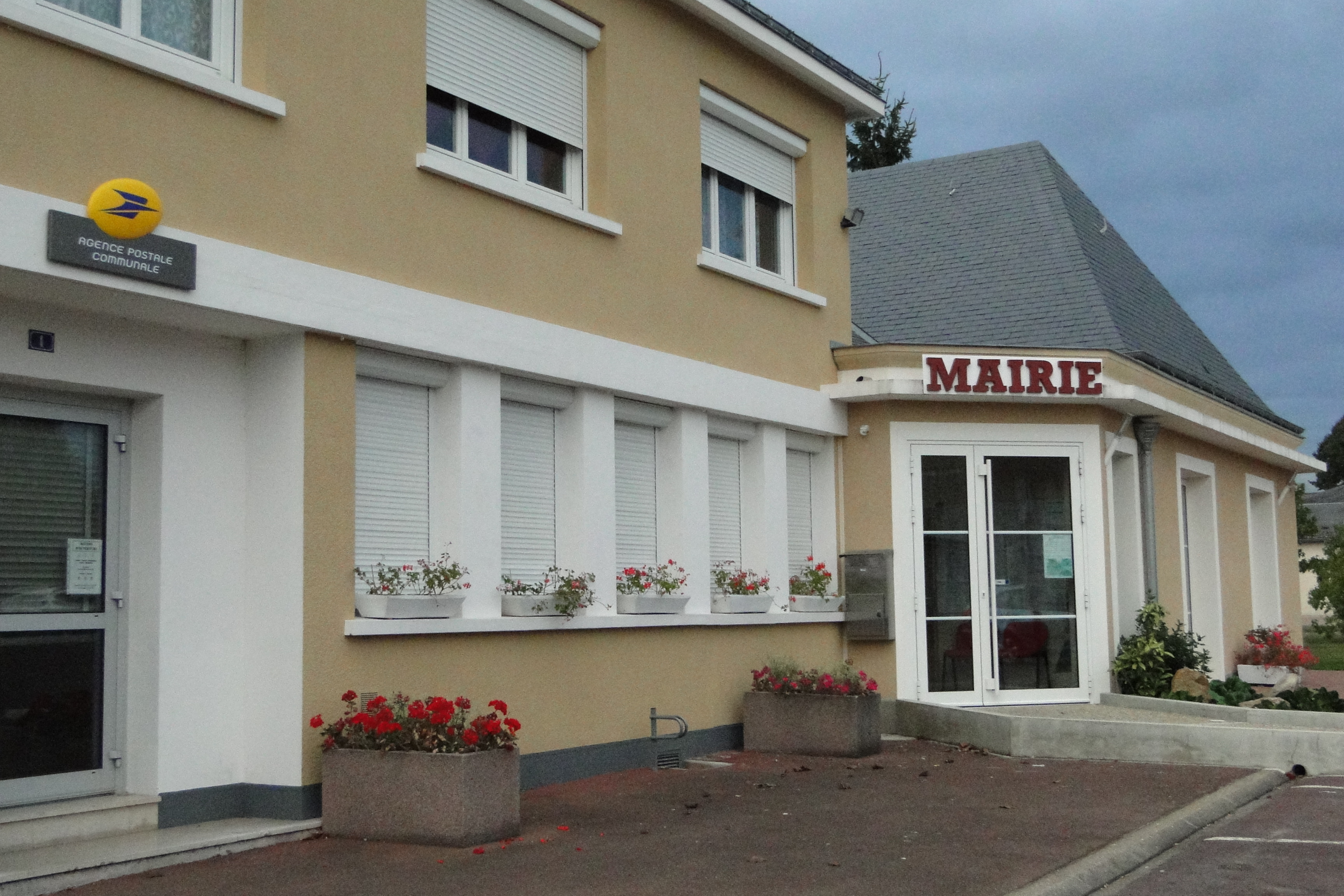
- The town hall and post office of Oizé
- Location of Oizé
- Location within France Location within Pays de la Loire
- Coordinates: 47°48′41″N 0°06′15″E
- Country: France
- Region: Pays de la Loire
- Department: Sarthe
- Arrondissement: La Flèche
- Canton: Le Lude
- Intercommunality: Pays Fléchois

Government
  - Mayor (2020–2026): Jean-Claude Boiziau
- Area^{1}: 16.91 km^{2} (6.53 sq mi)
- Highest elevation: 106 m (348 ft)
- Lowest elevation: 57 m (187 ft)
- Population (2023): 1,322
  - Density: 78.18/km^{2} (202.5/sq mi)
- Demonym(s): Oizéen, Oizéenne
- Time zone: UTC+01:00 (CET)
  - Summer (DST): UTC+02:00 (CEST)
- INSEE/Postal code: 72226 /72330
- ^{1} French Land Register data, which excludes lakes, ponds, glaciers > 1 km^{2} (0.386 sq mi or 247 acres) and river estuaries.

Oizé (French pronunciation: [waze]) is a commune in the Sarthe department in the region of Pays de la Loire in north-western France.

== Notable person ==
The polymath Marin Mersenne (1588–1648) was born near Oizé.

== See also ==
- Communes of the Sarthe department
