= Harmonie universelle =

1636 work by Marin Mersenne

Harmonie universelle, contenant la théorie et la pratique de la musique
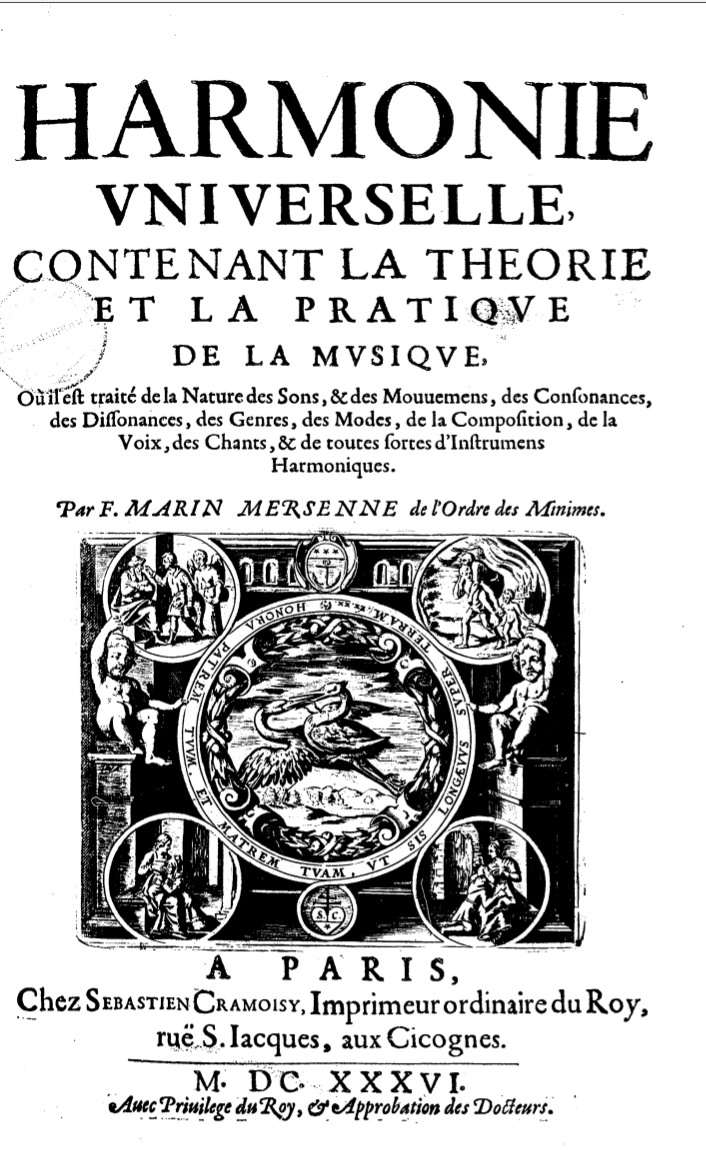
- Title page
- Author: Marin Mersenne
- Language: French
- Published: 1636
- Publication place: Kingdom of France
- Pages: 800

Harmonie universelle ("Universal Harmony"; complete title: Harmonie universelle, contenant la théorie et la pratique de la musique) is a work by Marin Mersenne, published in Paris in 1636. It represented the sum of musical knowledge during his lifetime.

This was a major work since it represented the most complete description of music theory near the middle of the 17th century in France. It covers all aspects including theoretical, practical, stylistic, organological, mathematical, acoustical, and theological.

== Content ==
The book covers topics including the nature of sounds, movements, consonance, dissonance, genres, modes of composition, voice, singing, and all kinds of harmonic instruments. Unlike modern works on music theory, it also covers the construction of instruments and acoustic propagation. This monumental treatise is abundant in illustrations (including musical engravings), and in systematic tables. It also remains the only source of certain musical works from Jacques Mauduit, Eustache Du Caurroy, Antoine de Sewn, or Pierre de La Barre in particular.

== Editions ==
- Mersenne, Marin (1636). Harmonie universelle.

== See also ==
- Mersenne's laws
