= Jacques-Alexandre Le Tenneur =

French mathematician (1604–1659)

- Citizenship: French
- Known for: Supporting Galileo's arguments for free falling objects
- Scientific career
- Fields: Mathematician

Jacques-Alexandre Le Tenneur (c. 1610 – c. 1660) was a French mathematician who defended Galileo Galilei's ideas. He corresponded with fellow mathematicians such as Pierre Gassendi, Pierre Hérigone and Marin Mersenne. It is unclear when or where he died but he probably lived from 1610 to 1660.

== Biography ==
Not much is known about Le Tenneur's personal life and most information comes from his letters to Mersenne and Garrendi. He was mostly self-educated during his early life in Paris. By 1646 he spent a little time in Clermont in the Auvergne region of central France. and then returned to settle in Paris.

=== Politics and background ===
In 1651 he became King Louis XIV's counsellor to the provincial senate of the old French province of Guyenne in Bordeaux. A civil war in France called The Fronde was going on at this time and involved Guyenne so Le Tenneur was likely involved with the political feuding of the civil war.

=== Support of Galileo ===
Le Tenneur was one of the few French scholars to understand Galileo and was involved in the debates around the controversy of falling bodies.

Galileo's thought experiment concerned the outcome (c) of attaching a small stone (a) to a larger one (b)

Until Galileo, it was thought that the speed of a falling body was proportional to its weight. The larger the weight, the faster its speed. Galileo probably did not drop balls of different weights off the leaning tower of Pisa but he did write De Motu Antiquiora about rolling balls of different weights and measuring their speeds.

In 1646, Honoré Fabri debated Galileo's theory of falling bodies. Mersenne, asked Le Tenneur to support Galileo against these attacks. Basically, Fabri argued that Galileo was resorting to the existence of mathematical instants which had been an ancient problem in Zeno's paradoxes.

Le Tenneur pushed back that Fabri's theory also required mathematical instants but that Galileo's theory was superior as it did not depend on time measurements.

Fabri got an anonymous copy of this critique from Mersenne and was impressed with the logic. Le Tenneur incorporated this in his most important work, De motu naturaliter accelerato tractatus physico-mathematicus [A physico-mathematical treatise on naturally accelerated motion], published in 1649.

It must needs be the case that the first space is to the second space like the two first spaces to the two subsequent ones, as has been shown against Fabri, because we obviously need a principle of uniformity in natural events as these need to proceed in an uninterrupted course. The consequence of this is that heavy bodies have no innate speed, but that in falling, they pass through all degrees of slowness and speed.

— J.-A. Le Tenneur

=== Vacuum ===
Another debate during his life was whether a vacuum could be created. The commonly held view was that nature abhorred a vacuum horror vacui. There was speculation that even God could not create a vacuum if he wanted. The church's 1277 Paris condemnations of Bishop Étienne Tempier, stated that there could be no restrictions on the powers of God, which led to the conclusion that God could create a vacuum if he so wished.

Around 1644, Evangelista Torricelli created a vacuum by inverting a column of mercury in a tube. There was still skepticism that a vacuum had actually been created so in January 1648, Mersenne asked if Le Tenneur could repeat the experiment of creating a vacuum at a higher elevation in Puy-de-Dôme.

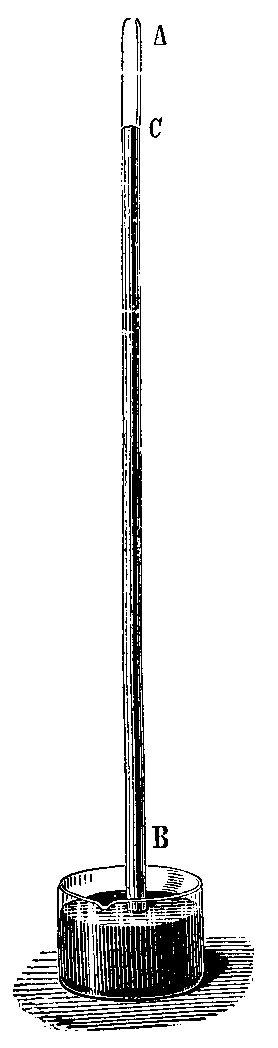
Torricelli's mercury barometer produced one of the first sustained vacuums in a laboratory.

Le Tenneur refused saying that it would be a waste of time and that there would be no difference. (Of course there would be but for reasons of atmospheric pressure rather than vacuum). The Puy-de-Dôme experiment was finally carried out in 1648 by others and led to the development of the barometer.

Mersenne was wrong in thinking that since light could pass through the space above the mercury column than it was probably not a vacuum. Le Tenneur was on the right side of this argument saying that if something of substance really did exist above the mercury column the mercury would have fallen further.

=== Geometry ===
In 1640, Le Tenneur published Traité des quantites incommensurables ou sont decidees plusieurs belles questions des nombres rationaus et irrationaus, l'erreurs de Stevin refutées, le dizieme livre d'Euclide illustre de nouvelles demonstrations [Treatise on Incommensurable Quantities, in which several fine questions concerning rational and irrational numbers are resolved, the errors of Stevin are refuted, and the tenth book of Euclid is illustrated with new demonstrations]. Le Tenneur wanted to go back to the old Greek style of geometry of rulers and a compass and not to use algebra to study geometry.
