= Gabriel-Philippe de La Hire =

Gabriel-Philippe de La Hire (25 July 1677 – 4 June 1719) was a French scientist, son of the astronomer Philippe de la Hire, who also contributed to astronomy but made some contributions to medicine and other sciences as well.

La Hire (or Philipe II) was born to Philippe de La Hire (1640–1718) and Catherine Lesage in Paris. He learned astronomy from his father at the Paris observatory and assisted him in making observations. He became an associate of the Academy of Sciences in 1699. Along with his father the two were accused of plagiarism by Jean Le Fèvre around 1702. La Hire published several papers to the Academy of Sciences from 1703. His 1699 study of the growth of human teeth under a microscope indicate that he observed the so-called Hunter-Schreger bands. In 1706 he was admitted member to the Royal Academy of Architecture and contributed a few works on the subject such as L’art de charpenterie (1702), on the use of timber in construction. In 1718 he worked with Jacques Cassini to establish the longitude of Amiens and Dunkirk.
