= Pierre Petit (engineer) =

French astronomer, military engineer, and physicist (1594–1677)

Pierre Petit (French: [pjɛʁ pəti]; 8 December 1594 – 20 August 1677) was a French astronomer, physicist, mathematician and instrument maker.

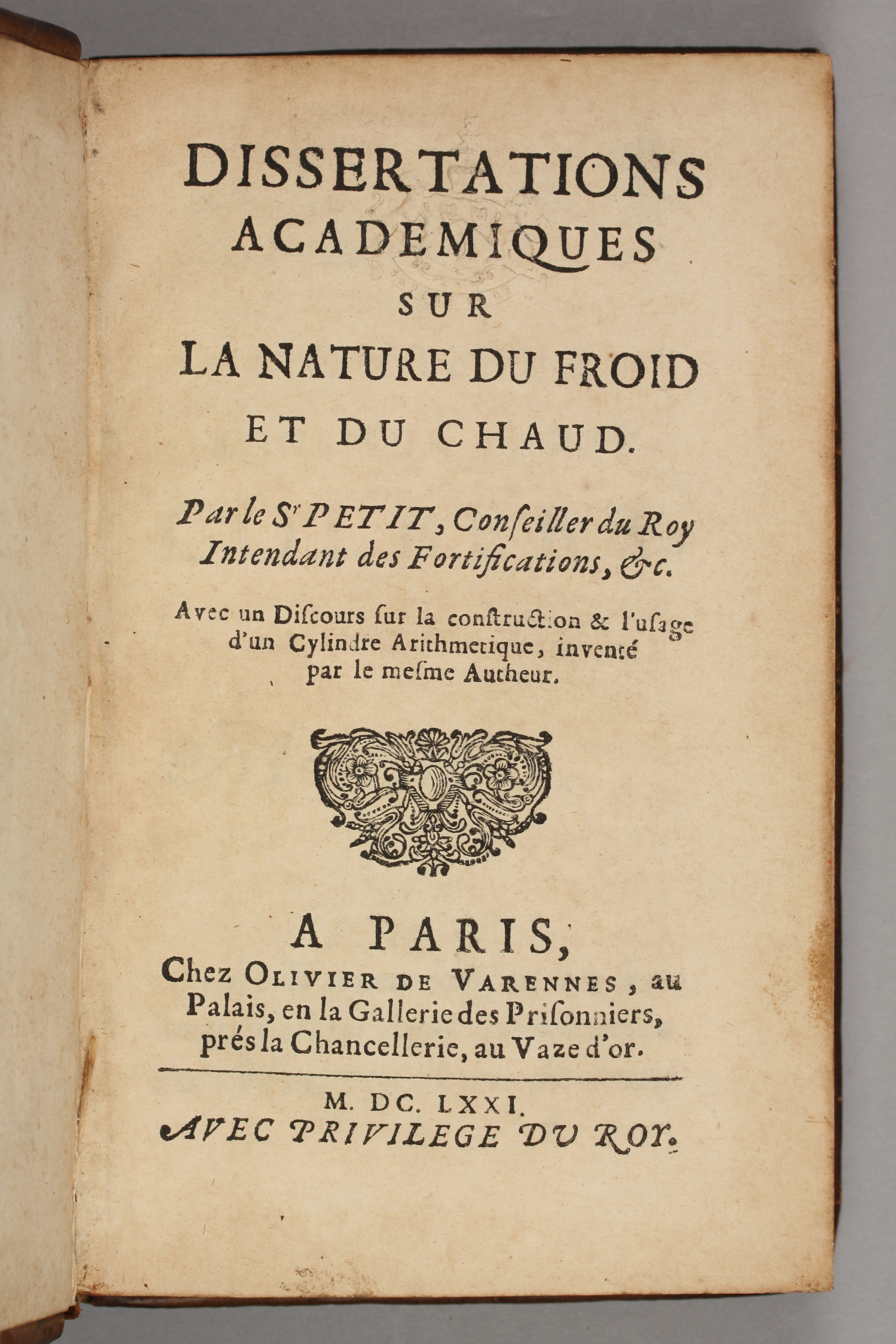
Dissertations académiques sur la nature, 1671

Petit was born in Montluçon, Bourbonnais, France. He succeeded his father in his municipal office (Contrôleur de l'élection), but went to Paris in 1633 to dedicate himself to the sciences. He was a member of the circle around Marin Mersenne, and knew Etienne Pascal, Blaise Pascal, and René Descartes. Later he was a member of the academy of Montmor. On 4 April 1667 he became a fellow of The Royal Society.

He also served as a military engineer and geographer to Louis XIII and Louis XIV, in roles such as Superintendent of Fortifications.

He died in Lagny-sur-Marne in 1677.
