= Honoré Fabri =

French theologian

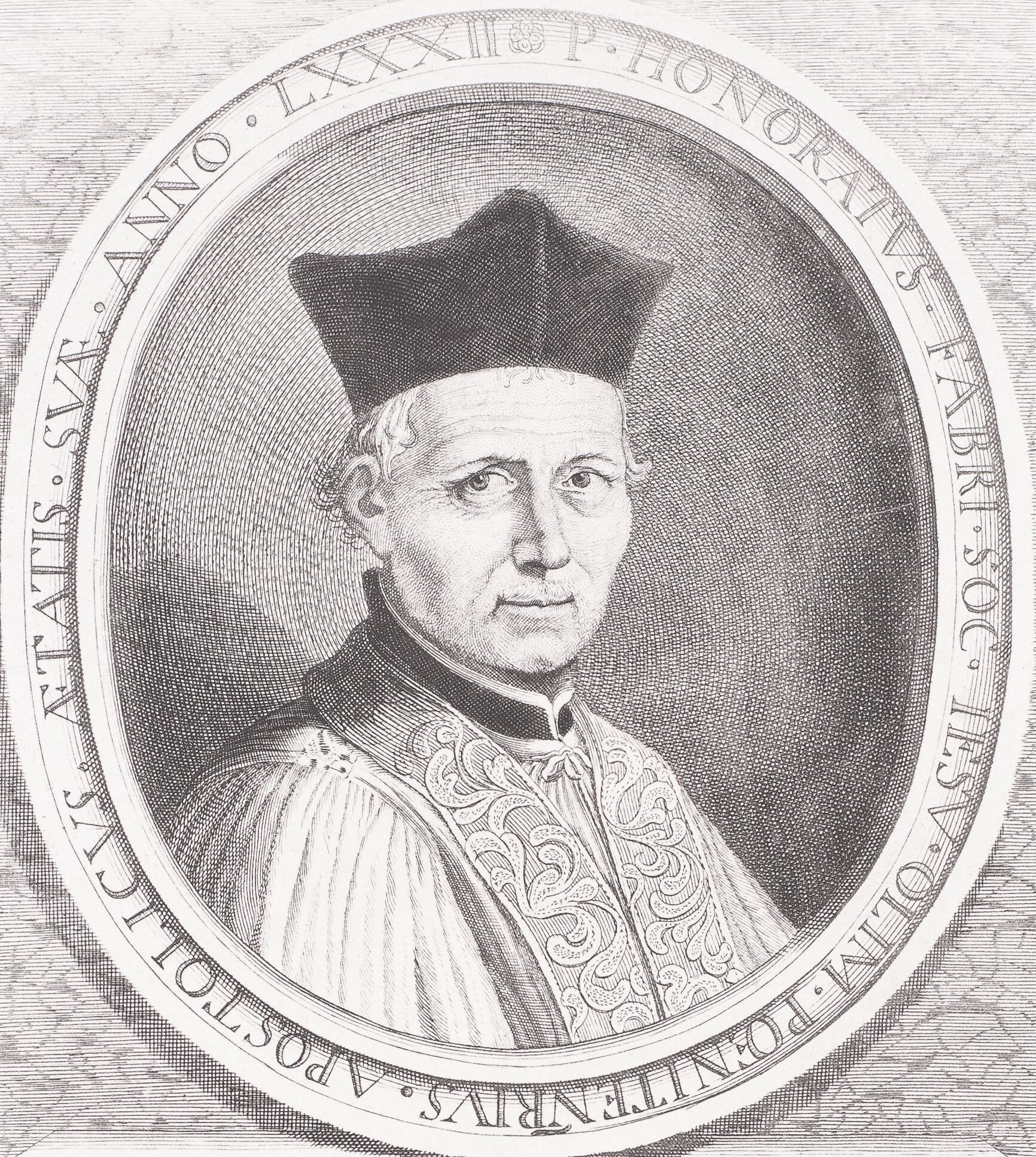
- Born: April 5, 1607; Virieu-le-Grand, Ain, France
- Died: March 8, 1688 (aged 79); Rome
- Occupations: Mathematician, physicist, Jesuit theologian, controversialist

Honoré Fabri SJ (Latin: Honoratus Fabrius; 5 April 1607 or 8 April 1608 – 8 March 1688) was a French Jesuit theologian, also known as Coningius. He was a mathematician, physicist and controversialist.

== Biography ==
Honoré Fabri was born on 5 April 1607 in Virieu-le-Grand, Ain, France. He entered the Society of Jesus at Avignon in 1626. He taught philosophy for eight years and mathematics for six years at the Jesuit college at Lyons, attracting many pupils. Called to Rome, after being “at odds with the fathers of his order” in Lyon, he became a member of the college of confessors at St. Peter’s Basilica, in which capacity he remained until 1680, the final three years as Rector of the community.

Fabri was a highly respected scientist among his contemporaries. He was elected to the Accademia del Cimento in 1657, the year the academy was founded. Leibniz placed him with Galileo, Torricelli, Steno and Borelli for his work on elasticity and the theory of vibrations, and alone with Galileo for his efforts to "rationalise experimental kinematics". Mersenne rated him "a veritable giant in science".

He died on 8 March 1688, at the age of 79 in Rome.

== Works ==
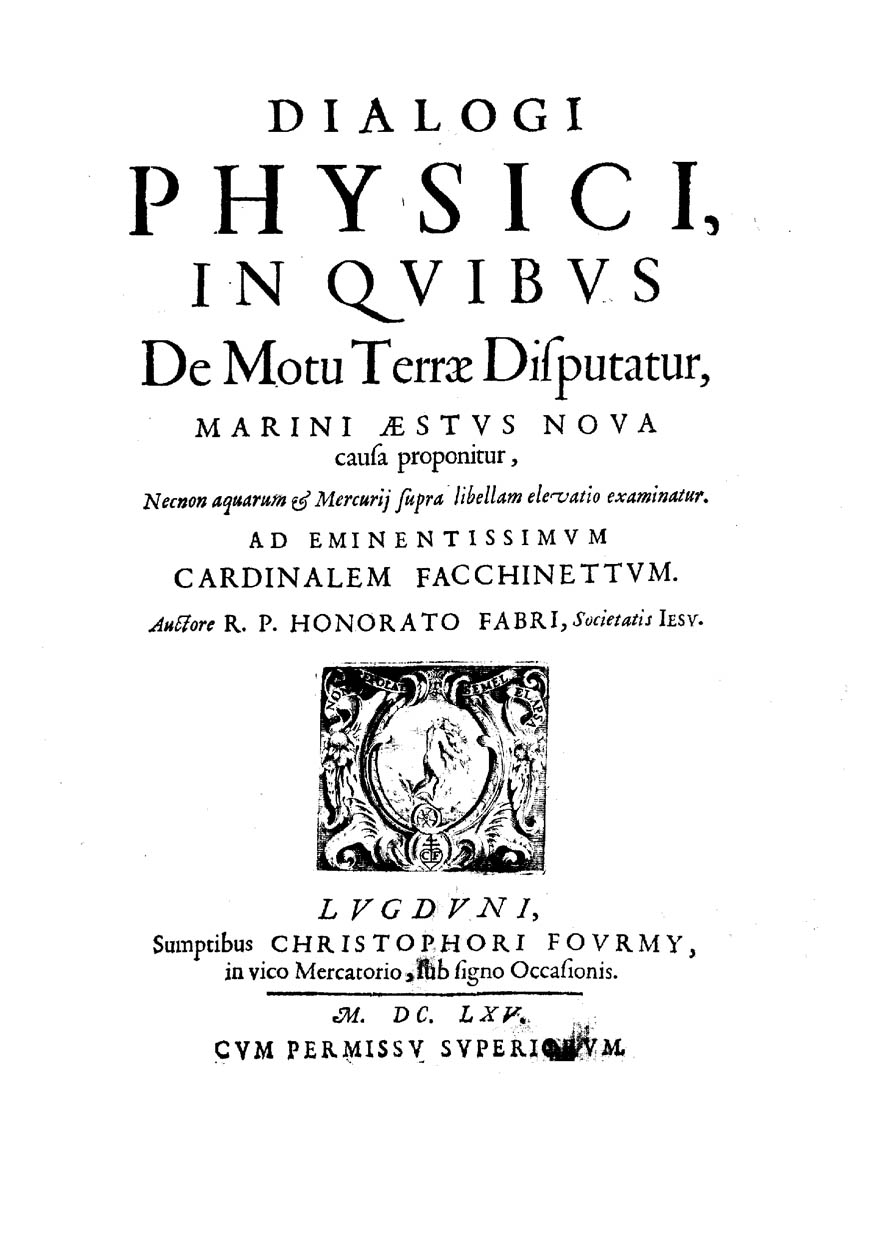
Dialogi physici, 1665

Sommervogel mentions thirty-one titles of published works in connection with Fabri's name, alongside fourteen of his productions in manuscript, in the Library of Lyons.

The following are the more important of his publications:

- Tractatus physicus du motu locali (1646).
- Metaphysica Demonstrativa, Sive Scientia Rationum Universalium (Lyon, 1648).
- Pithanophilus, seu dialogus vel opusculum de opinione probabili, etc. (Rome, 1659).

This work was attacked by Stefano Gradi, Prefect of the Vatican Library, in his Disputatio de opinione probabili (Rome, 1678; Mechlin, 1679).

- Honorati Fabri, Societatis Jesu, apolgeticus doctrinæ moralis ejusdem Societatis, (Lyons, 1670; Cologne, 1672).

This treats, in eleven dialogues, of probabilism, explaining its true nature, and refuting the charges of its opponents. The Cologne edition was considerably enlarged but did not meet with ecclesiastical approbation; it was placed on the Index of forbidden books soon after its appearance.

- Una fides unius Ecclesiæ Romanæ contra indifferentes hujus sæculi tribus librus facili methodo asserto, (Dillingen, 1657).
- Summula theologica in quâ quæstiones omnes alicujus momenti, quæ a Scholasticus agitari solent, breviter discutiuntur ac definiuntur, (Lyons, 1669).

The principles on which this work constructs its theological conclusions are far different from those of Aristotle.

- Euphiander seu vir ingeniosus, (Lyons, 1669; Vienna, 1731; Budapest, 1749; Ofen, 1763).

Most of Fabri's other works deal with philosophy, mathematics, physics, astronomy, and even zoology. In his treatise on man, he claims to have discovered the circulation of the blood, prior to William Harvey, but after having investigated this question, Auguste Bellynck arrives at the conclusion that, at best, Fabri may have made the discovery independently of Harvey.

- Dialogi physici sex quorum primum est de Lumine (1669) ["Six Dialogues on Physics: The First on Light"] is a treatise on physics in dialog form. The first dialog contained description of Grimaldi's experiments reported in Physico-mathesis de lumine (1665), which included the first reports of diffraction. Isaac Newton by his own admission learned about diffraction from the first dialog. The book was sent to Newton by John Collins on 30 April 1672.

== See also ==
- List of Roman Catholic scientist-clerics
