= Marin Mersenne =

French polymath (1588–1648)

The Reverend Marin Mersenne OM
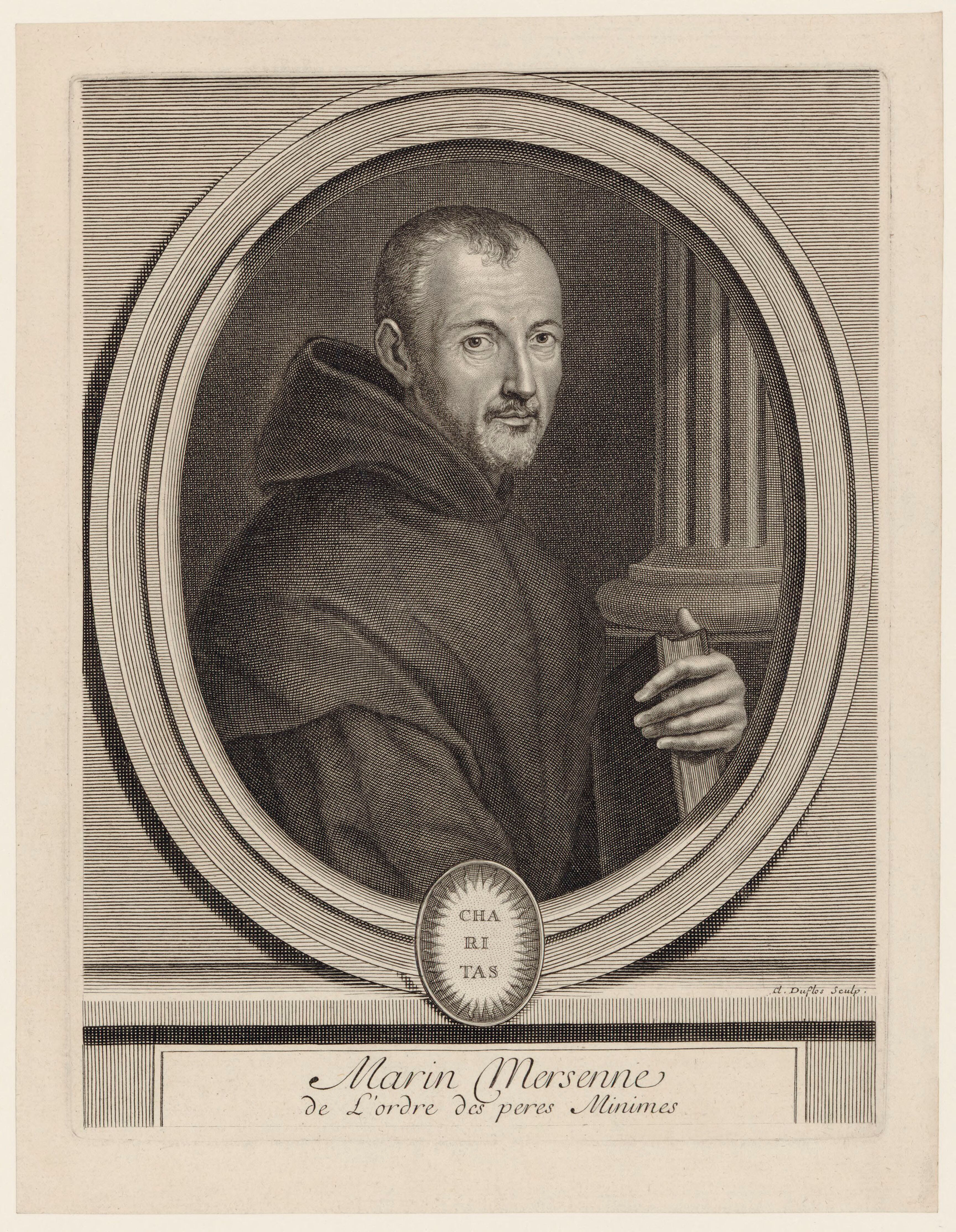
- Born: 8 September 1588; Oizé, Kingdom of France
- Died: 1 September 1648 (aged 59); Paris, Kingdom of France
- Other name: Marinus Mersennus
- Education: Jesuit College of La Flèche
- Known for: Mersenne primes Mersenne's conjecture Mersenne's laws Acoustics
- Scientific career
- Fields: Mathematics, physics

Marin Mersenne, OM (also known as Marinus Mersennus or le Père Mersenne; French: [maʁɛ̃ mɛʁsɛn]; 8 September 1588 – 1 September 1648) was a French polymath whose works touched a wide variety of fields. He is perhaps best known today among mathematicians for Mersenne prime numbers, those written in the form M_{n} = 2^{n} − 1 for some integer n. He also developed Mersenne's laws, which describe the harmonics of a vibrating string (such as may be found on guitars and pianos), and his seminal work on music theory, Harmonie universelle, for which he is referred to as the "father of acoustics".

Mersenne, an ordained Catholic priest, had many contacts in the scientific world and has been called "the center of the world of science and mathematics during the first half of the 1600s" and, because of his ability to make connections between people and ideas, "the post-box of Europe". He was also a member of the ascetical Minim religious order and wrote and lectured on theology and philosophy.

== Life ==
Mersenne was born of Jeanne Moulière, wife of Julien Mersenne, peasants who lived near Oizé, County of Maine (present-day Sarthe, France). He was educated at Le Mans and at the Jesuit College of La Flèche. On 17 July 1611, he joined the Minim Friars and, after studying theology and Hebrew in Paris, was ordained a priest in 1613.

Between 1614 and 1618, he taught theology and philosophy at Nevers, but he returned to Paris and settled at the convent of L'Annonciade in 1620. There he studied mathematics and music and met with other kindred spirits such as René Descartes, Étienne Pascal, Pierre Petit, Gilles de Roberval, Thomas Hobbes, and Nicolas-Claude Fabri de Peiresc. He corresponded with Giovanni Doni, Jacques Alexandre Le Tenneur, Constantijn Huygens, Galileo Galilei, and other scholars in Italy, England and the Dutch Republic. He was a staunch defender of Galileo, assisting him in translations of some of his mechanical works.

For four years, Mersenne devoted himself entirely to philosophic and theological writing, and published Quaestiones celeberrimae in Genesim (Celebrated Questions on the Book of Genesis) (1623); L'Impieté des déistes (The Impiety of the Deists) (1624); La Vérité des sciences (Truth of the Sciences Against the Sceptics, 1624). It is sometimes incorrectly stated that he was a Jesuit. He was educated by Jesuits, but he never joined the Society of Jesus. He taught theology and philosophy at Nevers and Paris.

In 1635 he set up the informal Académie Parisienne (Academia Parisiensis), which had nearly 140 correspondents, including astronomers and philosophers as well as mathematicians, and was the precursor of the Académie des sciences established by Jean-Baptiste Colbert in 1666. (Note: For a summary description of all members of the Academia Parisiensis from its creation until 1648, see De la Croix & Duchêne 2021, pp. 7–12.) He was not afraid to cause disputes among his learned friends in order to compare their views, notable among which were disputes between Descartes, Pierre de Fermat, and Jean de Beaugrand. Peter L. Bernstein, in his book Against the Gods: The Remarkable Story of Risk, wrote, "The Académie des Sciences in Paris and the Royal Society in London, which were founded about twenty years after Mersenne's death, were direct descendants of Mersenne's activities."

In 1635 Mersenne met with Tommaso Campanella but concluded that he could "teach nothing in the sciences ... but still he has a good memory and a fertile imagination." Mersenne asked if Descartes wanted Campanella to come to Holland to meet him, but Descartes declined. He visited Italy fifteen times, in 1640, 1641 and 1645. In 1643–1644 Mersenne also corresponded with the German Socinian Marcin Ruar concerning the Copernican ideas of Pierre Gassendi, finding Ruar already a supporter of Gassendi's position. Among his correspondents were Descartes, Galileo, Roberval, Pascal, Beeckman and other scientists.

He died on 1 September 1648 of complications arising from a lung abscess.

=== Work ===
Quaestiones celeberrimae in Genesim was written as a commentary on the Book of Genesis and comprises uneven sections headed by verses from the first three chapters of that book. At first sight the book appears to be a collection of treatises on various miscellaneous topics. However Robert Lenoble has shown that the principle of unity in the work is a polemic against magical and divinatory arts, cabalism, and animistic and pantheistic philosophies.

Mersenne was concerned with the teachings of some Italian naturalists that all things happened naturally and determined astrologically; for example, the nomological determinism of Lucilio Vanini ("God acts on sublunary beings (humans) using the sky as a tool"), and Gerolamo Cardano's idea that martyrs and heretic were compelled to self-harm by the stars; Historian of science William Ashworth explains "Miracles, for example, were endangered by the naturalists, because in a world filled with sympathies and occult forces—with what Lenoble calls a "spontanéité indéfinie"—anything could happen naturally".

Mersenne mentions Martin Del Rio's Investigations into Magic and criticises Marsilio Ficino for claiming power for images and characters. He condemns astral magic and astrology and the anima mundi, a concept popular amongst Renaissance neo-platonists. Whilst allowing for a mystical interpretation of the Cabala, he wholeheartedly condemned its magical application, particularly angelology. He also criticises Pico della Mirandola, Cornelius Agrippa, Francesco Giorgio and Robert Fludd, his main target.

Harmonie universelle is perhaps Mersenne's most influential work. It is one of the earliest comprehensive works on music theory, touching on a wide range of musical concepts, and especially the mathematical relationships involved in music. The work contains the earliest formulation of what has become known as Mersenne's laws, which describe the frequency of oscillation of a stretched string. This frequency is:

1. Inversely proportional to the length of the string (this was known to the ancients; it is usually credited to Pythagoras)
2. Proportional to the square root of the stretching force, and
3. Inversely proportional to the square root of the mass per unit length.

The formula for the lowest frequency is

$$f=\frac{1}{2L}\sqrt{\frac{F}{\mu}},$$

where f is the frequency [Hz], L is the length [m], F is the force [N] and μ is the mass per unit length [kg/m].

In this book, Mersenne also introduced several innovative concepts that can be considered the basis of modern reflecting telescopes:

- Much earlier than Laurent Cassegrain, he found the fundamental arrangement of the two-mirror telescope combination, a concave primary mirror associated with a convex secondary mirror, and discovered the telephoto effect that is critical in reflecting telescopes, although he was far from having understood all the implications of that discovery.
- Mersenne invented the afocal telescope and the beam compressor that is useful in many multiple-mirror telescope designs.
- He recognized also that he could correct the spherical aberration of the telescope by using aspherical mirrors and that in the particular case of the afocal arrangement he could do this correction by using two parabolic mirrors, though a hyperboloid is required.

Because of criticism that he encountered, especially from Descartes, Mersenne made no attempt to build a telescope of his own.

Mersenne is also remembered today thanks to his association with the Mersenne primes. The Mersenne Twister, named for Mersenne primes, is frequently used in computer engineering and in related fields such as cryptography.

However, Mersenne was not primarily a mathematician; he wrote about music theory and other subjects. He edited works of Euclid, Apollonius, Archimedes, and other Greek mathematicians. But perhaps his most important contribution to the advance of learning was his extensive correspondence (in Latin) with mathematicians and other scientists in many countries. At a time when the scientific journal had not yet come into being, Mersenne was the centre of a network for exchange of information.

It has been argued that Mersenne used his lack of mathematical specialty, his ties to the print world, his legal acumen, and his friendship with the French mathematician and philosopher René Descartes (1596–1650) to manifest his international network of mathematicians.

Mersenne's philosophical works are characterized by wide scholarship and the narrowest theological orthodoxy. His greatest service to philosophy was his enthusiastic defence of Descartes, whose agent he was in Paris and whom he visited in exile in the Netherlands. He submitted to various eminent Parisian thinkers a manuscript copy of the Meditations on First Philosophy, and defended its orthodoxy against numerous clerical critics.

In later life, he gave up speculative thought and turned to scientific research, especially in mathematics, physics and astronomy. In this connection, his best known work is Harmonie universelle of 1636, dealing with the theory of music and musical instruments. It is regarded as a source of information on 17th-century music, especially French music and musicians, to rival even the works of Pietro Cerone.

One of his many contributions to musical tuning theory was the suggestion of

$$\sqrt[4]{\frac{2}{3-\sqrt{2}}}$$

as the ratio for an equally-tempered semitone ($\sqrt[12]{2}$). It was more accurate (0.44 cents sharp) than Vincenzo Galilei's 18/17 (1.05 cents flat), and could be constructed using straightedge and compass. Mersenne's description in the 1636 Harmonie universelle of the first absolute determination of the frequency of an audible tone (at 84 Hz) implies that he had already demonstrated that the absolute-frequency ratio of two vibrating strings, radiating a musical tone and its octave, is 1 : 2. The perceived harmony (consonance) of two such notes would be explained if the ratio of the air oscillation frequencies is also 1 : 2, which in turn is consistent with the source-air-motion-frequency-equivalence hypothesis.

He also performed extensive experiments to determine the acceleration of falling objects by comparing them with the swing of pendulums, reported in his Cogitata Physico-Mathematica in 1644. He was the first to measure the length of the seconds pendulum, that is a pendulum whose swing takes one second, and the first to observe that a pendulum's swings are not isochronous as Galileo thought, but that large swings take longer than small swings.

=== Battles with occult and mystical thinkers ===
Two German pamphlets that circulated around Europe in 1614–15, Fama fraternitatis and Confessio Fraternitatis, claimed to be manifestos of a highly select, secret society of alchemists and sages called the Brotherhood of Rosicrucians. The books were allegories, but were obviously written by a small group who were reasonably knowledgeable about the sciences of the day, and their main theme was to promote educational reform (they were anti-Aristotelian). These pamphlets also promoted an occult view of science containing elements of Paracelsian philosophy, neo-Platonism, Christian Cabala and Hermeticism. In effect, they sought to establish a new form of scientific religion with some pre-Christian elements.

Mersenne led the fight against acceptance of these ideas, particularly those of Rosicrucian promoter Robert Fludd, who had a lifelong battle of words with Johannes Kepler. Fludd responded with Sophia cum moria certamen (1626), wherein he discusses his involvement with the Rosicrucians. The anonymous Summum bonum (1629), another critique of Mersenne, is a Rosicrucian-themed text. The cabalist Jacques Gaffarel joined Fludd's side, while Pierre Gassendi defended Mersenne.

The Rosicrucian ideas were defended by many prominent men of learning, and some members of the European scholarly community boosted their own prestige by claiming to be among the selected members of the Brotherhood. However, it is now generally agreed among historians that there is no evidence that an order of Rosicrucians existed at the time, with later Rosicrucian Orders drawing on the name, with no relation to the writers of the Rosicrucian Manifestoes.

During the mid-1630s Mersenne gave up the search for physical causes in the Aristotelian sense (rejecting the idea of essences, which were still favoured by the scholastic philosophers) and taught that true physics could be only a descriptive science of motions (Mécanisme), which was the direction set by Galileo Galilei. Mersenne had been a regular correspondent with Galileo and had extended the work on vibrating strings originally developed by his father, Vincenzo Galilei.

=== Music ===
An air attributed to Mersenne was used by Ottorino Respighi in his second suite of Ancient Airs and Dances.

== List of works ==
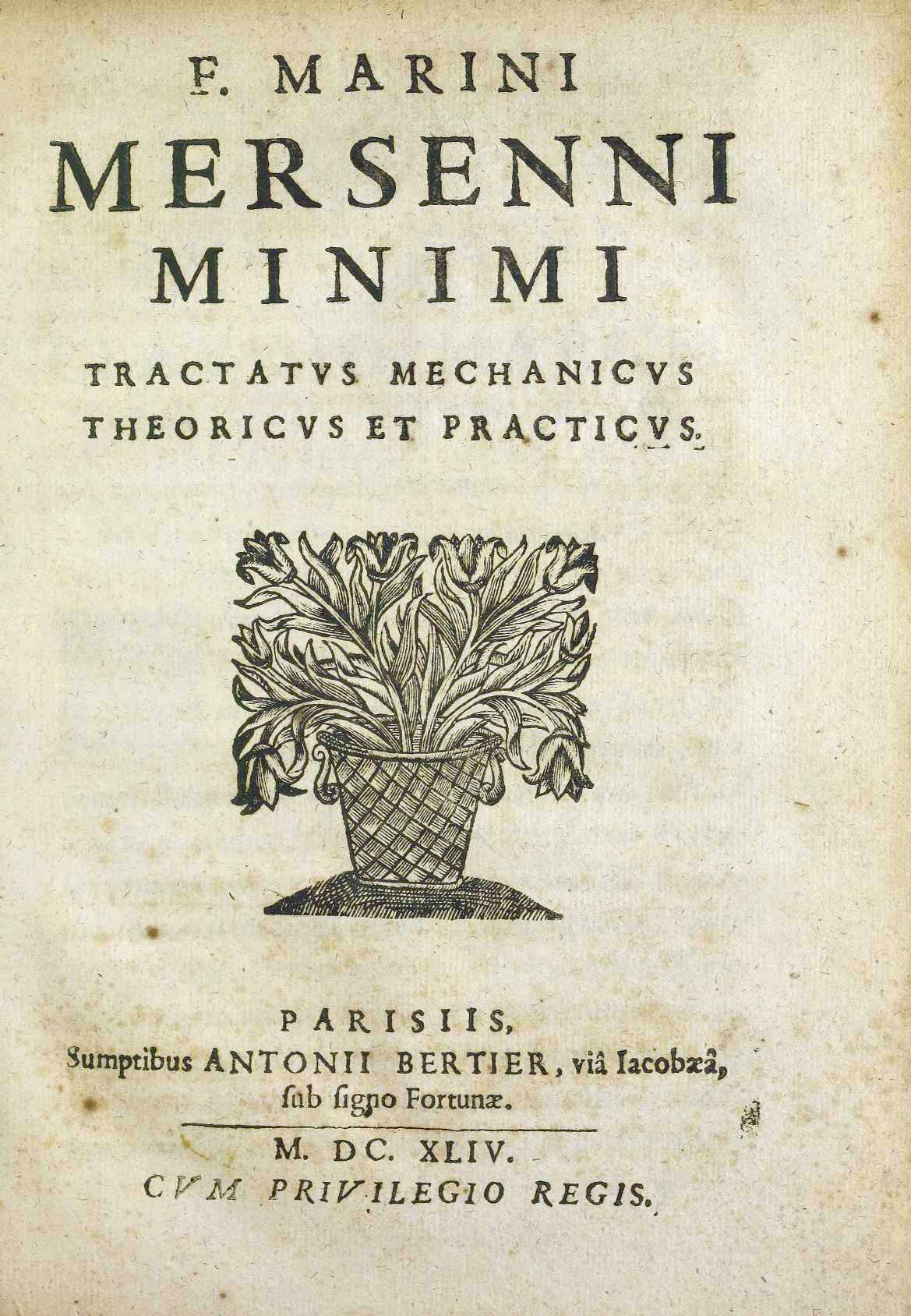
Tractatus mechanicus theoricus et practicus, 1644

- Euclidis elementorum libri, etc. (Paris, 1626)
- Les Mécaniques de Galilée (Paris, 1634)
- Questions inouies ou récréation des savants (1634)
- Questions théologiques, physiques, etc. (1634)
- Harmonie universelle First edition online from Gallica (Paris, 1636). Translation to English by Roger E. Chapman (The Hague, 1957)
- Nouvelles découvertes de Galilée (1639)
- Cogitata physico-mathematica (1644)
- Universae geometriae synopsis (1644)
- Tractatus mechanicus theoricus et practicus (in Latin). Paris: Antoine Bertier. 1644.

== See also ==
- Cassegrain reflector
- Catalan–Mersenne number/Catalan's Mersenne conjecture
- Cycloid
- Equal temperament
- Euler's factorization method
- List of Roman Catholic scientist-clerics
- Renaissance skepticism
- Seconds pendulum
