= List of compositions by Josquin des Prez =

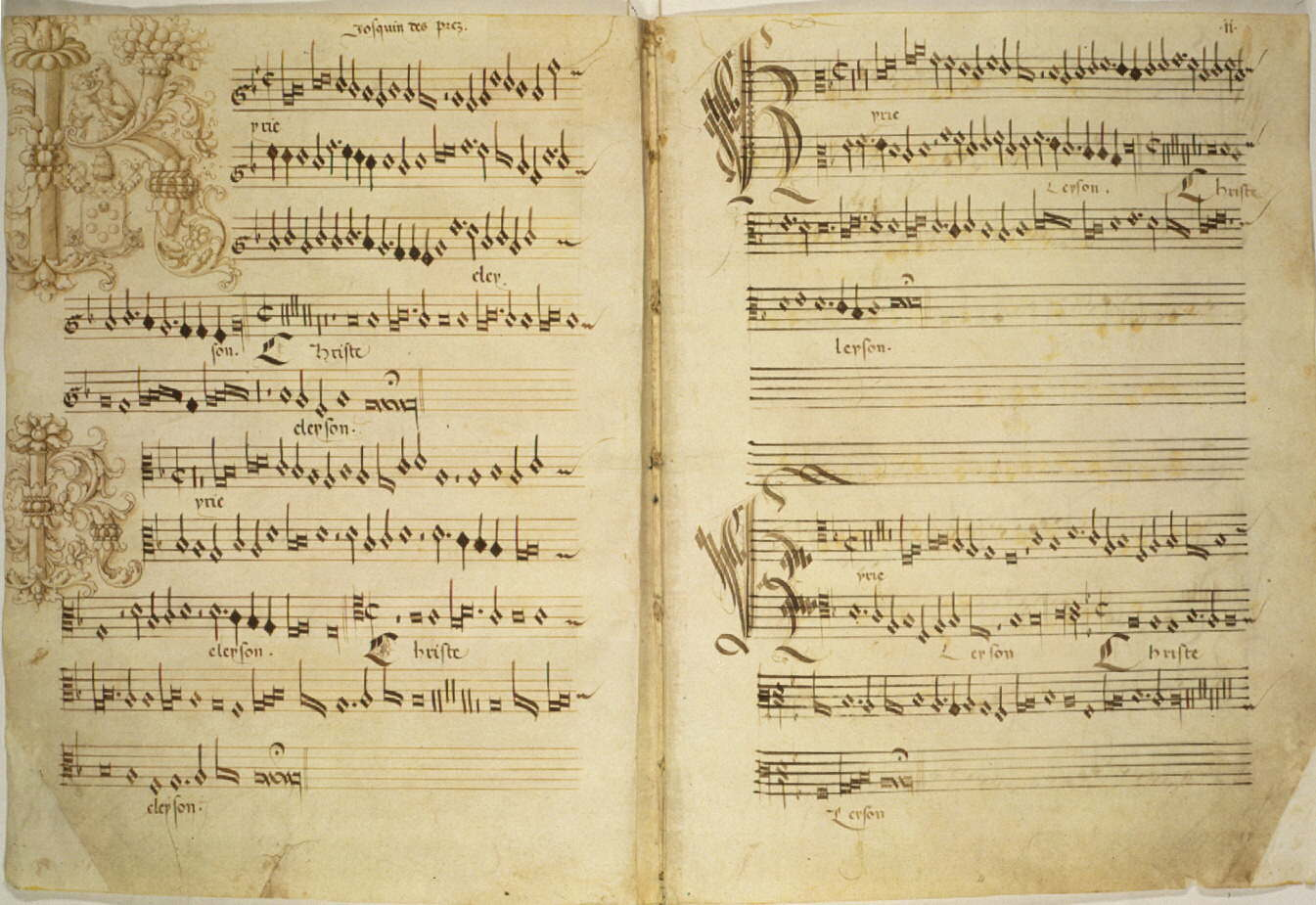
Manuscript copy from the papacy of Pope Leo X showing the opening Kyrie of Josquin's Missa de Beata Virgine in the manuscript Cappella Sistina 45

the French composer Josquin des Prez wrote masses, motets, chansons, and a handful of instrumental works. Much of his output comprises sacred polyphony.

In recent years the Josquin canon has come into better focus. Ongoing research has made it possible to identify a corpus of approximately 102 securely attributed works, comprising a core group of 54 pieces alongside another 48 that are provisionally attributable. About three dozen works are problematic; another 208, including three lost compositions, are spurious. The total number of pieces somewhere attributed to Josquin is 346.

Before the 1980s the seriousness of the problem was not adequately appreciated, owing to uncertainty about the dating and provenance of many central manuscripts as well as an undeveloped sense of how Josquin's musical style relates to that of his contemporaries and to the generation of composers who came after him. The enormous number of misattributions in the surviving sources reflects Josquin's unprecedented posthumous fame, above all in German-speaking lands. In 1540 the German editor Georg Forster summed up the situation: "I remember a certain eminent man saying that now that Josquin is dead he is putting out more works than when he was alive." The New Josquin Edition (NJE), published between 1987 and 2017, classifies as spurious—and therefore does not print—approximately 158 works; the actual number of inauthentic compositions is probably considerably higher. Scores of every piece somewhere attributed to Josquin can be accessed through the Josquin Research Project.

== Masses ==
For four voices unless otherwise noted

1. Missa Ave maris stella (ca. 1500)
2. Missa D'ung aultre amer (Milan, thus ca. 1483–89)
3. Missa De beata Virgine (à 5 from the Credo onward)
4. Missa Faisant regretz (Condé)
5. Missa Fortuna desperata (Rome, ca. 1489–94)
6. Missa Gaudeamus (ca. 1500)
7. Missa Hercules dux Ferrarie (Ferrara, 1503–4; Agnus dei III à 6)
8. Missa La sol fa re mi (Rome, ca. 1495)
9. Missa L'ami Baudichon (early 1480s?)
10. Missa L'homme armé sexti toni (probably from the 1480s; Agnus dei III à 6)
11. Missa L'homme armé super voces musicales (Rome, ca. 1489–94)
12. Missa Malheur me bat (Ferrara, 1503–4; Agnus dei III à 6)
13. Missa Pange lingua (Condé)
14. Missa Sine nomine (Condé)

Doubtful works:

1. Missa Ad fugam (canonic)
2. Missa Allez regrets (possibly by Johannes Stokem)
3. Missa Da pacem (probably by Noel Bauldeweyn)
4. Missa Di dadi (=N'aray je jamais) (published as authentic in NJE)
5. Missa Mater patris ((Agnus dei III à 5; published as authentic in NJE)
6. Missa Quem dicunt homines (Agnus dei III à 5)
7. Missa Une mousse de Biscaye (published as authentic in NJE)

== Mass sections ==
1. Gloria De beata virgine
2. Credo De tous biens playne (Rome?)
3. Sanctus De passione (Milan)
4. Sanctus D'ung aultre amer (Milan)

Doubtful works:

1. Credo Chascun me crie (= Des rouges nez)
2. Credo Vilayge (I)
3. Credo Vilayge (II)
4. Credo [Quarti toni] (canonic)

== Motets ==
For four voices unless otherwise noted

1. Alma redemptoris mater/Ave regina celorum (Rome)
2. Ave Maria ... benedicta tu (Milan)
3. Ave Maria ... virgo serena (Milan, ca. 1484);
4. Ave verum corpus (ca. 1500; à 2–3)
5. Benedicta es, caelorum regina (Condé; à 6)
6. Domine, ne in furore tuo
7. Domine, non secundum peccata nostra (Rome; à 2-4)
8. Factum est autem (ca. 1500)
9. Gaude virgo, mater Christi (ca. 1500)
10. Homo quidam fecit cenam magnam (à 5)
11. Honor, decus, imperium (Rome; hymn setting)
12. Huc me sydereo descendere jussit Olympo (ca. 1500; à 5)
13. Illibata Dei virgo nutrix (à 5)
14. In exitu Israel de Egypto (Condé)
15. In principio erat verbum (Condé)
16. Inviolata, integra et casta es Maria (à 5)
17. Liber generationis Jesu Christi (ca. 1500)
18. Magnificat tertii toni (before ca. 1490, in the manuscript Berlin 40021)
19. Memor esto verbi tui (ca. 1500)
20. Miserere mei Deus (Ferrara, 1503–4; à 5)
21. Missus est Gabriel angelus
22. Monstra te esse matrem (Rome; hymn setting)
23. O admirabile commercium (antiphon cycle, ca. 1500)
24. O domine Jesu Christe (ca. 1500?; motet cycle of five sections)
25. O virgo prudentissima (à 6; Condé)
26. Pater noster–Ave Maria (à 6; Condé, 15210)
27. Praeter rerum seriem (à 6; Condé)
28. Qui habitat in adiutorio altissimi (Condé)
29. Qui velatus facie fuisti (Milan; Passion cycle in six sections)
30. Salve regina (4vv)
31. Salve regina (5vv)
32. Stabat mater (ca. 1500; à 5)
33. Tu solus qui facis mirabilia (Milan)
34. Ut Phebi radiis (ca. 1500)
35. Victime paschali laudes
36. Virgo prudentissima (ca. 1500)
37. Virgo salutiferi/Ave Maria (Ferrara, 1503–4; à 5)
38. Vultum tuum deprecabuntur (Milan; motet cycle in seven sections)

Doubtful works (partial list):

1. Absalon, fili mi (4vv) (conjecturally attributed to Pierre de La Rue)
2. Absolve, quaesumus, Domine/Requiem aeternam (à 6)
3. Alma redemptoris mater;
4. Ave munda spes, Maria (not in first complete works edition)
5. Ave nobilissima creatura
6. De profundis clamavi (à 4)
7. Domine exaudi orationem meam
8. Ecce, tu pulchra es, amica mea (de-attributed by Rifkin, Rodin, and Fallows after the publication of "The Josquin Canon at 500")
9. In illo tempore assumpsit Jesus duodecim discipulos
10. Iniquos odio habui (à 4; only the tenor survives)
11. Jubilate Deo omnis terra
12. Magnificat quarti toni
13. Misericordias Domini in aeternum cantabo
14. Mittit ad virginem
15. O bone et dulcissime Jesu
16. O virgo virginum
17. Planxit autem David
18. Qui edunt me adhuc
19. Qui habitat in adiutorio altissimi (à 24)
20. Usquequo Domine oblivisceris me
21. Veni, sancte spiritus (probably by Forestier)

== Song–motets ==
1. A la mort/Monstra te esse matrem (à 3)
2. Ce povre mendiant/Pauper sum ego (à 3)
3. Nimphes, nappées/Circumdederunt me (Condé; à 6)
4. Nymphes des bois (lament for Johannes Ockeghem); à 5)
5. Que vous ma dame/In pace in idipsum (à 3)

== Songs ==
For four voices unless otherwise noted

1. A l'ombre d'ung buissonet, au matinet (à 3)
2. A l'heure
3. Adieu mes amours, on m'attent/Adieu mes amours, adieu command
4. Baisiez moy
5. Bergerette savoyenne
6. Cela sans plus (à 3; survives without text)
7. Comment peult aver joye
8. Cueur langoreulx (à 5)
9. Douleur me bat (à 5)
10. Du mien amant (à 5)
11. En l'ombre d'ung buissonet tout, au long (à 3)
12. En l'ombre d'ung buissonet tout, au long
13. Entré je suis en grant pensée (à 3)
14. Entré je suis en grant pensée
15. Faulte d'argent (à 5)
16. Fors seuelement (anonymous in its surviving sources)
17. Incessament livré suis à martire (à 5)
18. Je n'ose plus (à 3; possibly instrumental)
19. Je sey bien dire (survives without text)
20. La plus de plus (à 3)
21. Parfons regretz (à 5)
22. Petite camusette (à 6)
23. Plaine de dueil (à 5)
24. Plus nulz regretz (ca. 1508; commemorates the Treaty of Calais (1507));
25. Plusieurs regretz (à 5)
26. Pour souhaitter (à 6)
27. Qui belles amours a
28. Regretz sans fin (à 6)
29. Scaramella va alla guerra
30. Se congié prens (à 6)
31. Si j'ay perdu mon amy (à 3)
32. Une mousque de Biscaye; (possibly instrumental)
33. Vous l'arez, s'il vous plaist (à 6)

Doubtful works (partial list):

1. Adieu mes amours (à 6 or à 7)
2. Allégez moy (à 6)
3. Baisiez moy (à 6)
4. Belle, pour l'amour de vous
5. Dulces exuvie(à 4)
6. Fama malum (à 4)
7. Fors seulement (only one of six voice parts survives)
8. Helas madame
9. Je me complains
10. Je ne me puis tenir d'aimer (5vv)
11. Je ris et si ay larme
12. La belle se siet
13. Ma bouche rit et mon cueur pleure
14. Mille regretz
15. Mon mary m'a diffamée
16. N'esse pas ung grant desplaisir
17. Plus n'estes ma maistresse
18. Quant je vous voye
19. Recordans de my signora(à 4)
20. Si j'ay perdu mon amy (à 4)
21. Tant vous aimme Bergeronette
22. Tenez moy en voz bras
23. Vous ne l'arez pas (à 6)
24. El Grillo
25. In te domine speravi
26. textless (4vv)

== Instrumental or apparently instrumental works ==
À 3 unless otherwise noted

1. De tous biens plaine
2. De tous biens plaine (à 4)
3. Fortuna d'un gran tempo
4. Ile fantazies de Joskin
5. La Bernardina
6. Le villain (à 4)
7. Vive le roy (à 4; probably for Louis XII)

== Sources ==
- Fallows, David. Josquin. Turnhout: Brepols Publishers, Second edition, 2020, ISBN 978-2-503-56674-0.
- Macey, Patrick; Noble, Jeremy; Dean, Jeffrey; Reese, Gustave (2011) [2001]. "Josquin (Lebloitte dit) des Prez". Grove Music Online. Oxford: Oxford University Press. doi:10.1093/gmo/9781561592630.article.14497. ISBN 978-1-56159-263-0. (subscription, Wikilibrary access, or UK public library membership required)
