= Josquin (disambiguation) =

Josquin des Prez (c. 1450 – 1521) was a composer of High Renaissance music

Josquin may also refer to:

== People ==
- Josquin Baston (c. 1515 – c. 1576), Dutch composer
- Josquin Dor (fl. 1516–1522), Franco-Flemish singer and composer in the court of Matthias Corvinus
- Josquin Des Pres, French-born American musical artist
