= Missa Gaudeamus =

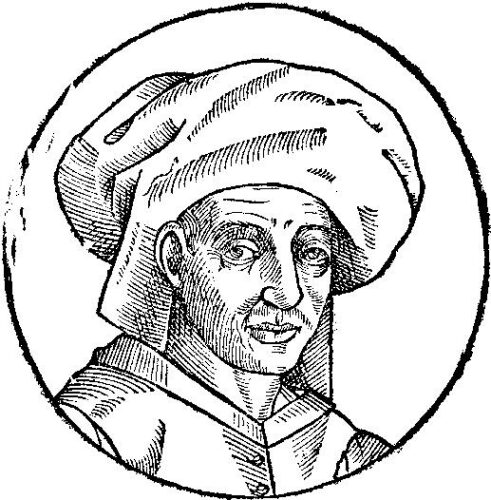
A 1611 woodcut of Josquin des Prez

The Missa Gaudeamus is a musical setting of the Ordinary of the Mass by Franco-Flemish composer Josquin des Prez, probably composed in the early or middle 1480s, and published in 1502. It is based on the gregorian introit Gaudeamus Omnes and its setting is for four voices.

== Sources and attribution ==
The number of sources for this work is relatively high: two printed editions, four reprints and seven manuscripts. The [Missa] super Gaudeamus mass was first published in Misse Josquin ("Liber Primus Missarum Josquin ") (Venice, 1502) by Ottaviano Petrucci together with the masses L'homme arme. Super voces musicales, La.sol.fa.re.mi, Fortuna desperata, L'homme arme. Sexti toni, and reprinted in Rome in 1526. Among the first manuscript copies we mention the Kyrie copied by Johannes Orceau, for the Sistine Chapel, in Rome, dated between 1503 and 1512. Some sources misattribute the mass to Ockeghem: The Fugger manuscript A-Wn Cod. 11778, probably copied in the 1520s by Pierre Alamire ascribes the mass to Ockeghem, as well as an 1836 manuscript in Leipzig by Moritz Hauptmann. (Note: RISM 201001100 RISM ID no. 201001100) Fétis, in his Biographie universelle des musiciens, under the voice relative to Ockeghem, (Note: In the same work, under the voice relative to Josquin, the Missa Gaudeamus is listed among the ones published by Petrucci in 1502, sources: J666) cites a manuscript of the Kyrie and Christe of a messe [..] intitulée Gaudeamus published by Kiesewetter in 1834; however, such authorship had been later amended by Kiesewetter in his 1848 edition of the History of the modern music of western Europe.

== Genesis and background ==
There are no manuscript sources that can be dated before 1502, and Planchart suggests that the mass can be dated around the 1480s. Because of its style the work is probably the earliest among the other masses based on a gregorian plainsong that Josquin started composing by the middle of his compositional career (the others being Ave maris stella, De Beata Virgine, Da pacem and Pange lingua).

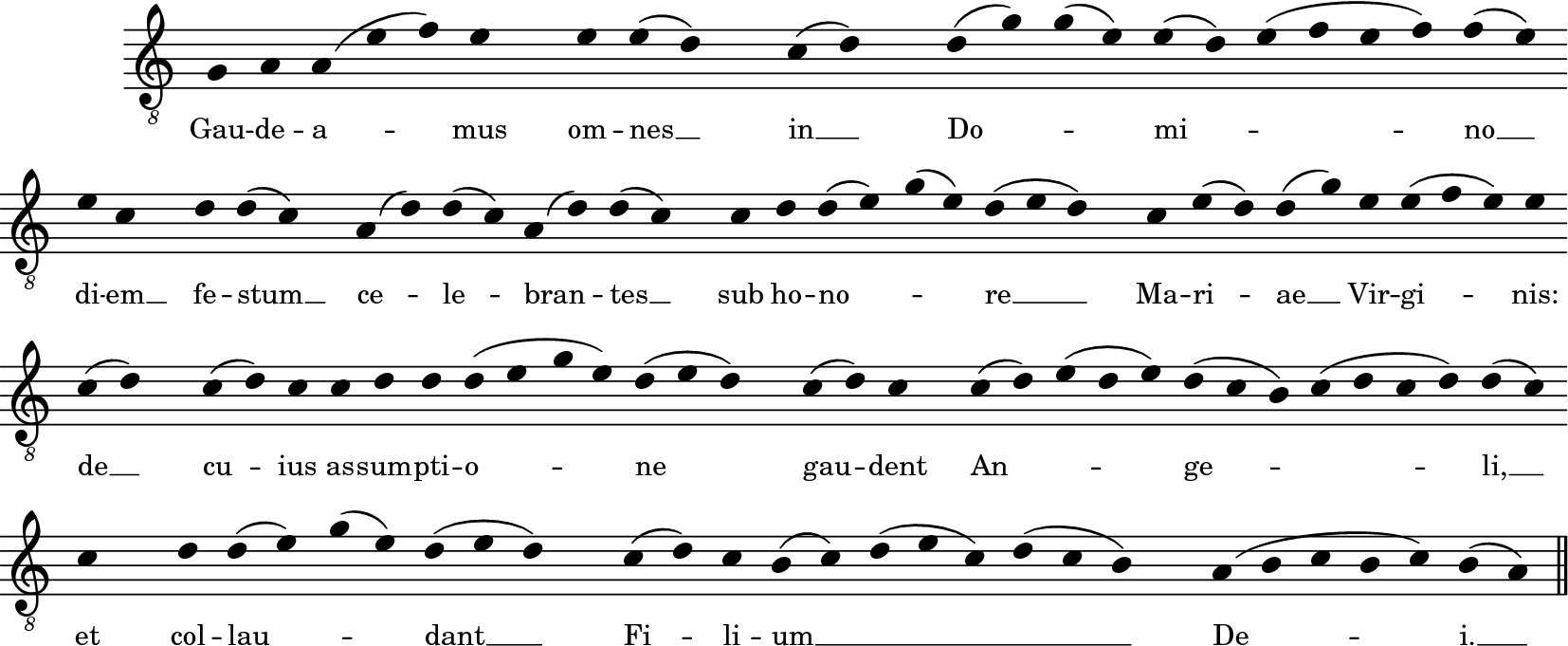
Gaudeamus omnes introit, transposed up a fifth, reported in the West-Frankish tradition version (c. 1500). Cambrai B 12, fo 49r-v. Josquin follows this version for the cantus firmus of the mass, with some notable exceptions closer to the north Italian tradition.

By comparing four different versions of the Gaudeamus introit (taken respectively from the Graduale Romanum, the north Italian tradition of the 15th century, the north Italian tradition of the 11th century and the French tradition) Planchart notes motivic resemblances to the north Italian versions, suggesting that the composer was in northern Italy when composed the mass, basing on one of the local sources. B bringing similar examples taken from the works of Guillaume Dufay, he also points out as such strong resemblance to one particular source despite another could indicate that composers of that time did not necessary wrote down their cantus firmus from memory.

Gaudeamus appears also to be the key to assess the work's liturgical destination and spiritual inspiration. The introit is traditionally sung at the feast of the Assumption of the Virgin, connoting the work as a Marian mass. Traditionally, the choice of a liturgical cantus firmus makes the mass specific for a feast of a group of feasts (in this case, celebrations devoted to the Virgin Mary). However, Willem Elders has proposed an alternative interpretation of the work: the same introit, with textual variations, is sung at other saints celebrations, for instance the Mass of St. Agata (the original version) and, most notably, for All Saints celebration.

The motif made up by the first six notes of the introit, which makes up the word Gaudeamus, is the most recognizable melodic material, and can be recognized 6 times in the Kyrie, 14 in the Gloria, 2 in the Credo, 12 in the Sanctus and 27 in the Agnus Dei; as this numbers are far from proportional to the length of the various sections, Elders suggests an intentional and numerological plot behind the numbers of Gaudeamus statements in each section, as symbols related to the Book of Revelation, disclosing the profound inspiration of the work as a history of salvation. This enforces the thesis that the Mass could be destined to All Saints' Day Liturgy; among the readings for that day stand the Book of Revelation (7:2-12) and the gospel is taken from Matthew (5), the sermon of beatitudes.

== Style ==
The mass presents sections written with different compositional techniques and style; the cantus firmus technique coexists with ostinato passages as well as more free counterpoint. The aforementioned Gaudeamus Omnes introit, transposed up a fifth, is quoted rather unchanged in the cantus firmus at the tenor up to "Mariae Virginis" in the Kyrie, completely in the Gloria and the Credo. However, borrowings from this melodic material appear in all voices, most notably the Gaudeamus intonation appears in many variations (Planchart classifies 10 different variations,) in all voices, involved in ostinato passages (e.g. Kyrie I, Et in terra, Sanctus, Osanna, Agnus III); other fragments of the chant can be heard in the other voices as well, e.g. in Kyrie II this is used by superius and bass to anticipate the entrance of the tenor on the same motif. The treatment of the cantus firmus itself is not uniform, as, often, the tenor, rather than sustaining the other voices with long notes, follows their rhythmic gestures (e.g. Christe, Kyrie II, second half of Gloria). Similarly, in many sections an ordered imitative pattern flows into more free counterpoint as the section develops (e.g. in Christe, second section of Credo (Et incarnatus), Sanctus). A recurrent, oscillatory pattern between two pitches (e.g. superius, tenor in Kyrie I, superius in Gloria, tenor in Et in spiritum) which is another distinctive melodic element of many passages in the mass, can be derived from a similar treatment of words such as omnes and domino in the introit.

This less rigid utilization of the pre-existing material in addition to cantus firmus anticipates the paraphrasing technique which will be widely adopted in the last Missa Pange lingua.

Regarding the style of the mass, Jeremy Noble says it "combines cantus-firmus techniques and those of ostinato with vigour and inventiveness" while Planchart stresses the "abundance of melodic and rhythmic invention that seems to grow unchecked by any rational plan" and relates its style to the masses of Obtrecht. The same author identifies two macro-units in the mass, evidencing close compositional procedures, one being the group of sections Kyrie, Sanctus and Agnus, the other being the Gloria and Credo; when coming to the tonal classification of the mass, Planchart avoids to classify simply the mass as in dorian mode transposed by a fifth on A, bringing examples of its modal richness and complexity (a typical characteristic among late 15th-century polyphony), for instance borrowings from the Phrygian mode in the Credo.

== External links and resources ==
Missa Gaudeamus: Scores at the International Music Score Library Project (features also a recording of the mass by Collegium Musicum, University of Kansas)
