= Josquin Dor =

Franco-Flemish singer and composer (fl. 1516–1522)

Josquin Dor (fl. 1516–1522) was a Franco-Flemish singer and composer of Renaissance music.

== Life and career ==
Josquin Dor was active around 1516 to 1522 serving Cardinal Ippolito d'Este. He later moved to Rome to be in Pope Leo X's musici segreti, and then the papal choir. At some point, he spent time in the court of the Hungarian king Matthias Corvinus, alongside Johannes de Stokem and possibly Josquin des Prez.

== Music ==
The Missa de nostra domina is Dor's only surviving work, though the work's Credo was written by the little-known composer Johannes Beausseron.
