= Josquin des Prez =

Composer of the Renaissance (c. 1450–1521)

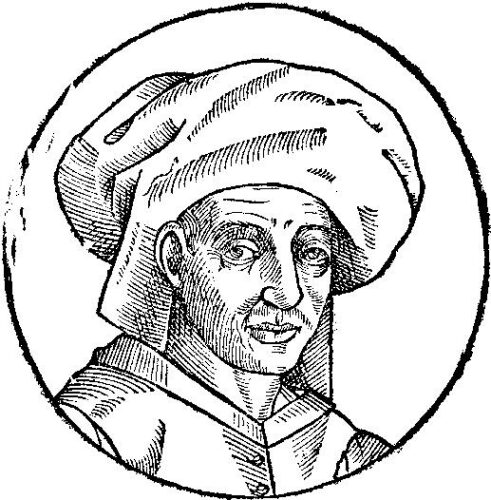
- A 1611 woodcut of Josquin des Prez, possibly copied from a now-lost oil painting made during his lifetime. There have been doubts concerning whether this depiction is an accurate likeness, see § Portraits.
- Born: c. 1450 – 1455
- Died: 27 August 1521
- Occupations: Composer; Singer
- Works: List of compositions

Josquin Lebloitte dit des Prez (c. 1450 – 1455 – 27 August 1521) was a French or Franco-Flemish composer of Renaissance music. Considered one of the greatest composers of the Renaissance, he was a central figure of the Franco-Flemish School and had a profound influence on 16th-century European music. Building on the work of his predecessors like Johannes Ockeghem, he developed a complex style of expressive, often imitative movement between independent voices (polyphony). He emphasized the relationship between text and music, and departed from the early Renaissance tendency towards lengthy melismatic lines on a single syllable, preferring to use shorter, repeated motifs between voices. Josquin was a singer, and his compositions are mainly vocal. They include masses, motets and secular chansons.

His biography has been continually revised by scholarship. Born in present-day northeastern France or Belgium, he was in the choir of René of Anjou by 1477 and, later, likely served under Louis XI. In the 1480s, Josquin traveled Italy with Cardinal Ascanio Sforza, possibly worked in Vienna for Hungarian king Matthias Corvinus, and wrote the motet Ave Maria ... Virgo serena and popular chansons Adieu mes amours and Que vous ma dame. He served Pope Innocent VIII and Pope Alexander VI, Louis XII, and Ercole I d'Este. Many of his works were printed and published by Ottaviano Petrucci, including the Missa Hercules Dux Ferrariae. In his final years in Condé, Josquin produced some of his most admired works, including the motets Benedicta es, Inviolata, Pater noster–Ave Maria and Praeter rerum seriem, and chansons Nimphes, nappés and Plus nulz regretz.

Described as the first Western composer to retain posthumous fame and influence, Josquin was widely performed and imitated in 16th-century Europe, and was highly praised by Martin Luther and music theorists Heinrich Glarean and Gioseffo Zarlino. In the Baroque era, Josquin was overshadowed by Italian composer Giovanni Pierluigi da Palestrina. During the 19th- and 20th-century early music revival, publications by August Wilhelm Ambros, Albert Smijers, Helmuth Osthoff, and Edward Lowinsky culminated in a successful academic conference in 1971. This prompted a reevaluation of Josquin as a central figure in Renaissance music, though some scholars have questioned whether he has been unrealistically elevated over his contemporaries. In the 21st century, his music is frequently treated in scholarship and recorded. He was celebrated worldwide on the 500th anniversary of his death in 2021.

== Name ==
Josquin's full name, Josquin Lebloitte dit des Prez, became known in the late 20th century. A pair of 1483 documents found in Condé-sur-l'Escaut identify the composer as the nephew of Gille Lebloitte dit des Prez and the son of Gossard Lebloitte dit des Prez. His first name Josquin is a diminutive form of Josse, the French form of the name of Judoc, a Breton saint of the 7th century. Josquin was a common name in Flanders and Northern France in the 15th and 16th centuries. Other documents indicate that the surname des Prez had been used by the family for at least two generations, perhaps to distinguish them from other branches of the Lebloitte family. At the time, the name Lebloitte was rare and the reason that Josquin's family took up the more common surname des Prez as their dit name remains uncertain.

His name has many spellings in contemporary records: his first name is spelled as Gosse, Gossequin, Jodocus, Joskin, Josquinus, Josse, Jossequin, Judocus and Juschino; and his surname is given as a Prato, de Prato, Pratensis, de Prés, Desprez, des Prés and des Près. In his motet Illibata Dei virgo nutrix, he includes an acrostic of his name, where it is spelled IOSQVIN Des PREZ. Documents from Condé, where he lived for the last years of his life, refer to him as "Maistre Josse Desprez". These include a letter written by the chapter of Notre-Dame of Condé to Margaret of Austria where he is named as "Josquin Desprez". Scholarly opinion differs on whether his surname should be written as one word (Desprez) or two (des Prez), with publications from continental Europe preferring the former and English-language publications the latter. Modern scholarship typically refers to him as Josquin.

== Life ==
=== Early life ===
==== Birth and background ====
Hainault and the surrounding area in the time of Josquin

Little is known about Josquin's early years. The specifics of his biography have been debated for centuries. The musicologist William Elders noted that "it could be called a twist of fate that neither the year, nor the place of birth of the greatest composer of the Renaissance is known". He is now thought to have been born around 1450, and at the latest 1455, making him "a close contemporary" of composers Loyset Compère and Heinrich Isaac, and slightly older than Jacob Obrecht. (Note: A now-outdated theory is that he was born around 1440, based on a mistaken association with Jushinus de Kessalia, recorded in documents as "Judocus de Picardia". A reevaluation of his later career, name and family background has discredited this claim.) Josquin's father Gossart dit des Prez was a policeman in the castellany of Ath, who was accused of numerous offenses, including complaints of undue force, and disappears from the records after 1448. (Note: Gossart had died by the time Josquin took up his inheritance in 1483. It remains uncertain exactly when he died, and whether the composer was an orphan for much of his youth.) Nothing is known of Josquin's mother, who is absent from surviving documents, suggesting that she was either not considered Josquin's legitimate mother, or that she died soon after, or during, his birth. Around 1466, perhaps on the death of his father, Josquin was named by his uncle and aunt, Gille Lebloitte dit des Prez and Jacque Banestonne, as their heir.

Josquin was born somewhere in what is now northeastern France or Belgium. (Note: Modern scholarship differs in how it describes Josquin's nationality; his exact birthplace is unknown, and determining nationalities for 15th-century composers is problematic in general. He is known to have been born somewhere in French-speaking Flanders. The musicologist Gustave Reese contends that "By far the greater number of [Josquin's] secular compositions have French texts. Culturally and legally Josquin was a Frenchman". As such, sources such as Patrick Macey, Jeremy Noble, Jeffrey Dean and Reese in Grove Music Online call him a "French composer". The musicologist Nanie Bridgman notes that Josquin succeeded Ockeghem in leading the 'Netherland[ish] Style', but also that Josquin and his contemporaries united that school with the "very different world of French music", resulting in what scholars call the Franco-Flemish School. Some sources refer to him as 'Franco-Flemish'.) Despite his association with Condé in his later years, Josquin's own testimony indicates that he was not born there. The only firm evidence for his birthplace is a later legal document in which Josquin described being born beyond Noir Eauwe, meaning 'Black Water'. This description has puzzled scholars, and there are various theories on which body of water is being referred to. L'Eau Noire river in the Ardennes has been proposed, and there was a village named Prez there, though the musicologist David Fallows contends that the complications surrounding Josquin's name make a surname connection irrelevant, and that the river is too small and too far from Condé to be a candidate. Fallows proposes a birthplace near the converging Escaut and Haine rivers at Condé, preferring the latter since it was known for transporting coal, perhaps fitting the "Black Water" description. (Note: If the Haine theory from Fallows is correct, that would mean Josquin was born in the County of Hainaut, which would fit with a 1560 verse by the poet Pierre de Ronsard that describes him as such.) Other theories include a birth near Saint-Quentin, Aisne, due to his early association with the Collegiate Church of Saint-Quentin, or in the small village of Beaurevoir, which is near the Escaut, a river that may be referred to in an acrostic in his later motet Illibata Dei virgo nutrix.

==== Youth ====
There is no documentary evidence covering Josquin's education or upbringing. Fallows associates him with Goseequin de Condent, an altar boy at the collegiate church of Saint-Géry, Cambrai until mid-1466. Other scholars such as Gustave Reese relay a 17th-century account from Cardinal Richelieu's friend Claude Hémeré, suggesting that Josquin became a choirboy with his friend Jean Mouton at the Collegiate Church of Saint-Quentin; this account has been questioned. The collegiate chapel there was an important center of royal patronage and music for the area. All records from Saint-Quentin were destroyed in 1669, and Josquin may have acquired his later connections with the French royal chapel through an early association with Saint-Quentin. There is no evidence that Josquin studied with Johannes Ockeghem, as claimed by later writers such as Gioseffo Zarlino and Lodovico Zacconi. Later commentators probably only have meant that Josquin "learnt from the older composer's example". Josquin wrote a lamentation on the death of Ockeghem, Nymphes des bois, he also musically quoted Ockeghem several times, most directly in his double motet Alma Redemptoris mater/Ave regina caelorum, which shares an opening line with Ockeghem's motet Alma Redemptoris mater. (Note: The similarities between these two pieces are "often cited as a clear allusion"; Fallows expresses uncertainty on how meaningful the similarities between Josquin's Alma Redemptoris mater/Ave regina caelorum and Ockeghem's Alma Redemptoris mater are, see Fallows (2020, p. 37). See Finscher (2000, pp. 258–260) for analysis on how Josquin quickly departs from Ockeghem's style in this work. See this image for an example.)

Josquin was probably associated with Cambrai Cathedral, as there is a "des Prez" among the cathedral's musicians listed in Omnium bonorum plena, a motet by Compère. The motet was composed before 1474 and names many important musicians of the time, including Antoine Busnois, Johannes Tinctoris, Johannes Regis, Ockeghem and Guillaume Du Fay. The motet may refer to the singer Pasquier Desprez, but Josquin is a likelier candidate. (Note: Due to chronological issues in his career Josquin was long dismissed as the "des Prez" of Compère's motet. Modern research allows for the reexamination of this possibility. See Fallows (2020, pp. 25–29) for further information.) Josquin was certainly influenced by Du Fay's music; the musicologist Alejandro Planchart suggests that the impact was not particularly large.

==== Early career ====
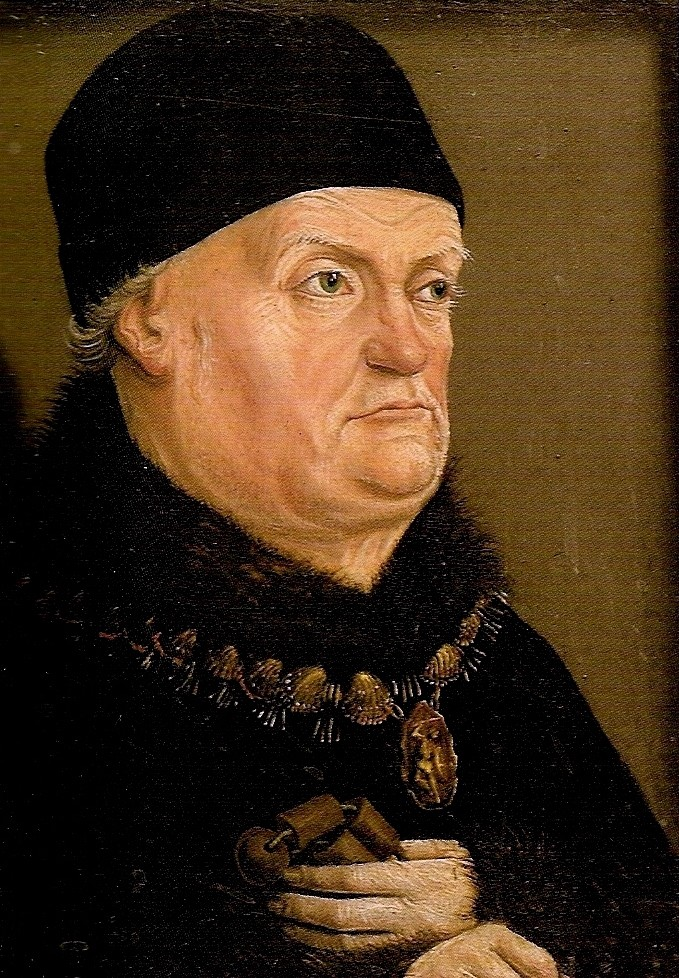
René of Anjou, Josquin's first known employer

The first firm record of Josquin's employment is from 19 April 1477 when he was a singer in the chapel of René of Anjou, in Aix-en-Provence. Other evidence may place him in Aix as early as 1475. Josquin remained there until at least 1478, after which his name disappears from historical records for five years. He may have remained in René's service, joining his other singers to serve Louis XI, who sent them to the Sainte-Chapelle of Paris. A further connection to Louis XI may perhaps be inferred from Josquin's early motet Misericordias Domini in aeternum cantabo, which could have been a musical tribute to the king, since it ends with the phrase "In te Domine speravi, non confundar in aeternum", words from Psalm 30:2 that Louis commissioned Jean Bourdichon to write on 50 scrolls in the Château de Plessis-lez-Tours. A less accepted theory for Josquin's activities between 1478 and 1483 is that he had already entered the household of his future employer Ascanio Sforza in 1480. In that case, Josquin would have been with Ascanio in Ferrara and might have written his Missa Hercules Dux Ferrariae at this time for Ercole d'Este. Around this period the Casanatense chansonnier was collected in Ferrara, which includes six chansons by Josquin, Adieu mes amours, En l'ombre d'ung buissonet, Et trop penser, Ile fantazies de Joskin, Que vous ma dame and Une mousque de Biscaye. Adieu mes amours and Que vous ma dame are thought to have been particularly popular, given their wide dissemination in later sources.

In February 1483 Josquin returned to Condé to claim his inheritance from his aunt and uncle, who may have been killed when the army of Louis XI besieged the town in May 1478 and had the population locked and burned in a church. In the same document, the collegiate church of Condé is reported to have given vin d'honneur (lit. 'wine of honor') to Josquin, because "as a musician who had already served two kings, he was now a distinguished visitor to the little town". Josquin hired at least 15 procurators to deal with his inheritance, suggesting he was then wealthy. This would explain how later in his life he was able to travel frequently and did not have to compose greatly demanded mass cycles like contemporaries Isaac and Ludwig Senfl.

=== Italy and travels ===
==== Milan and elsewhere ====
Tentative outline of Josquin's life from 1483 to 1489
Date	Location	Confidence
March 1483	Condé	Certain
August 1483	Departure from Paris	Possible
March 1484	Rome	Possible
15 May 1484	Milan	Certain
June–August 1484	Milan (with Ascanio)	Certain
Up to July 1484	Rome (with A.)	Certain
July 1485	Plans to leave (with A.)	Certain
1485 – ?	Vienna	Possible
Jan–Feb 1489	Milan	Certain
Early May 1489	Milan	Probable
June 1489	Rome (in Papal choir)	Certain

A surviving record indicates that Josquin was in Milan by 15 May 1484, perhaps just after his 1483 trip to Condé. In March 1484 he may have visited Rome. Fallows speculates that Josquin left Condé for Italy so quickly because his inheritance gave him more freedom and allowed him to avoid serving a king who he suspected had caused the deaths of his aunt and uncle. By then, the sacred music of Milan Cathedral had a reputation for excellence. Josquin was employed by the House of Sforza, and on 20 June 1484 came into the service of Cardinal Ascanio Sforza. Josquin's renown as a composer, a strong recommendation from a patron of fellow musician, or the use of his wealth, might have helped him get this prestigious and long-term position. While working for Ascanio, on 19 August Josquin successfully requested a previously rejected dispensation to be rector at the parish church Saint Aubin without having been ordained a priest. Joshua Rifkin dates the well-known motet Ave Maria ... Virgo serena to this time, c. 1485. (Note: Ave Maria ... Virgo serena is among Josquin's most frequently analyzed and celebrated works. See Dumitrescu (2009), Milsom (2015) and Rifkin (2003) for further information on the motet.)

Josquin went to Rome with Ascanio in July 1484 for a year, and may have gone to Paris for a litigation suit involving the benefice in Saint Aubin during the later 1480s. Around this time the poet Serafino dell'Aquila wrote his sonnet to Josquin, "Ad Jusquino suo compagno musico d'Ascanio" ("To Josquin, his fellow musician of Ascanio"), which asks him "not to be discouraged if his 'genius so sublime' seemed poorly remunerated". (Note: See Elders (2013, p. 34) for the complete poem and an English translation) Between 1485 and 1489 Josquin may have served under the Hungarian king Matthias Corvinus in Vienna; an account by the Cardinal Girolamo Aleandro in 1539 recalls the archbishop of Esztergom Pal Varday stating that the court of Matthias included "excellent painters and musicians, among them even Josquin himself". Some scholars suggest Aleandro was repeating a false rumor, or that Varday confused Josquin des Prez for Josquin Dor or Johannes de Stokem. Fallows contends that it is unlikely that Varday, who was well-educated and a musician, would have made such a mistake, but concedes that it is possible. The court of Matthias had a high standard of music and employed numerous musicians, many of them from Italy. Though Fallows asserts that Josquin's presence in the Hungarian king's service is likely, the evidence is circumstantial, and no original documents survive to confirm the claim. Josquin was in Milan again in January 1489, probably until early May, and met the theorist and composer Franchinus Gaffurius there.

==== Rome ====
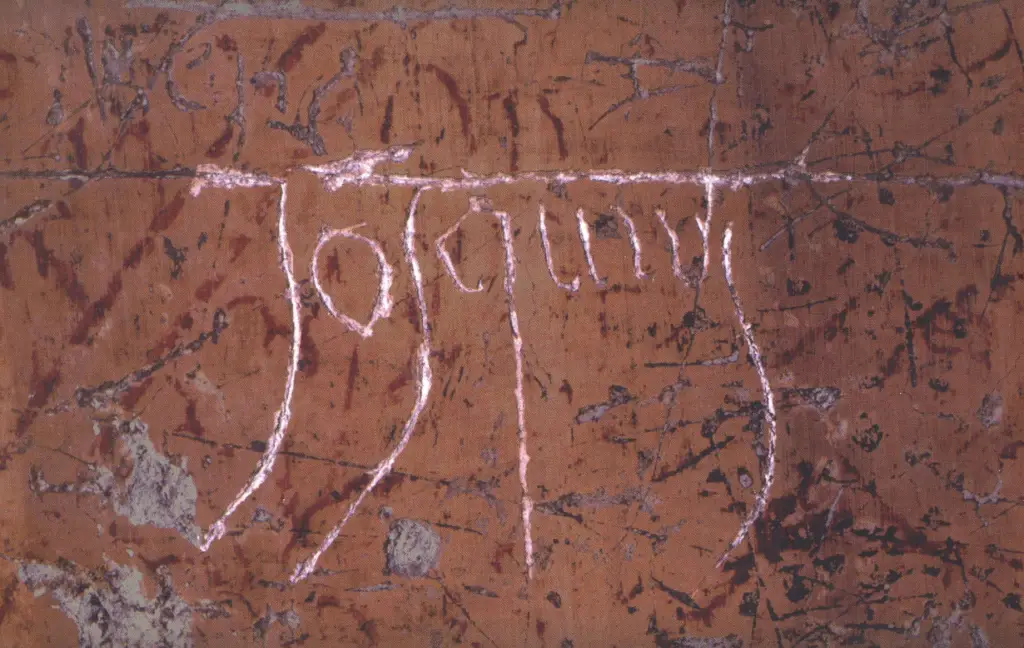
Josquin's presumed signature (JOSQUINJ) on the Sistine Chapel's choir gallery wall

From June 1489 until at least April 1494, Josquin was a member of the papal choir in Rome, under Pope Innocent VIII then the Borgia pope Alexander VI. (Note: Until 1997 Josquin was thought to have joined the papal choir in 1486, as he was mistakenly identified with a 'Jo. de Pratis' in papal documents. It is now thought that this refers to the composer Johannes de Stokem instead, and thus the earliest record of Josquin's employment in the papal choir is from 1489. See Starr (1997) for further information.) Josquin may have arrived there due to an exchange of singers between Ludovico Sforza and Pope Innocent, where the latter sent Gaspar van Weerbeke to Milan, presumably in return for Josquin. Josquin's arrival brought much-needed prestige to the choir, as the composers Gaspar and Stokem had left recently and the only other choristers known to be composers were Marbrianus de Orto and Bertrandus Vaqueras. Two months after his arrival, Josquin laid claim to the first of various benefices on 18 August. Holding three unrelated benefices at once, without having residency there or needing to speak that area's language, was a special privilege that Josquin's tenure and position offered; many of his choir colleagues had also enjoyed such privileges. His claims included a canonry at the Notre-Dame de Paris; Saint Omer, Cambrai; a parish in the gift of Saint-Ghislain Abbey; the Basse-Yttre parish church; two parishes near Frasnes, Hainaut; and Saint-Géry, Cambrai. Surviving papal letters indicate that some of these claims were approved, but he does not appear to have taken up any of the canonries. The Sistine Chapel's monthly payment records give the best record of Josquin's career, but all papal chapel records from April 1494 to November 1500 are lost, making it unknown when he left Rome.

After restorations from 1997 to 1998, the name JOSQUINJ was found as a graffito on the wall of the Sistine Chapel's cantoria (choir gallery). It is one of almost four hundred names inscribed in the chapel, around a hundred of which can be identified with singers of the papal choir. They date from the 15th to 18th centuries, and the JOSQUINJ signature is in the style of the former. There is some evidence suggesting the name refers to Josquin des Prez; it may be interpreted as either "Josquin" or "Josquinus", depending on whether the curved line on the far right is read as the abbreviation for "us". Other choristers named Josquin tended to sign their name in full, whereas Josquin des Prez is known to have done so mononymously on occasion. Andrea Adami da Bolsena notes in his 1711 Osservazioni per ben regolare il coro dei cantori della Cappella Pontificia that in his time Josquin's name was visibly 'sculpted' in the Sistine Chapel's choir room. The musicologist Richard Sherr writes that "while this is not a true autograph signature, the possibility that Josquin des Prez actually produced it during his stay in the papal chapel is very high", and Fallows says that "it hardly counts as an autograph, but it may be the closest we can get."

=== France ===
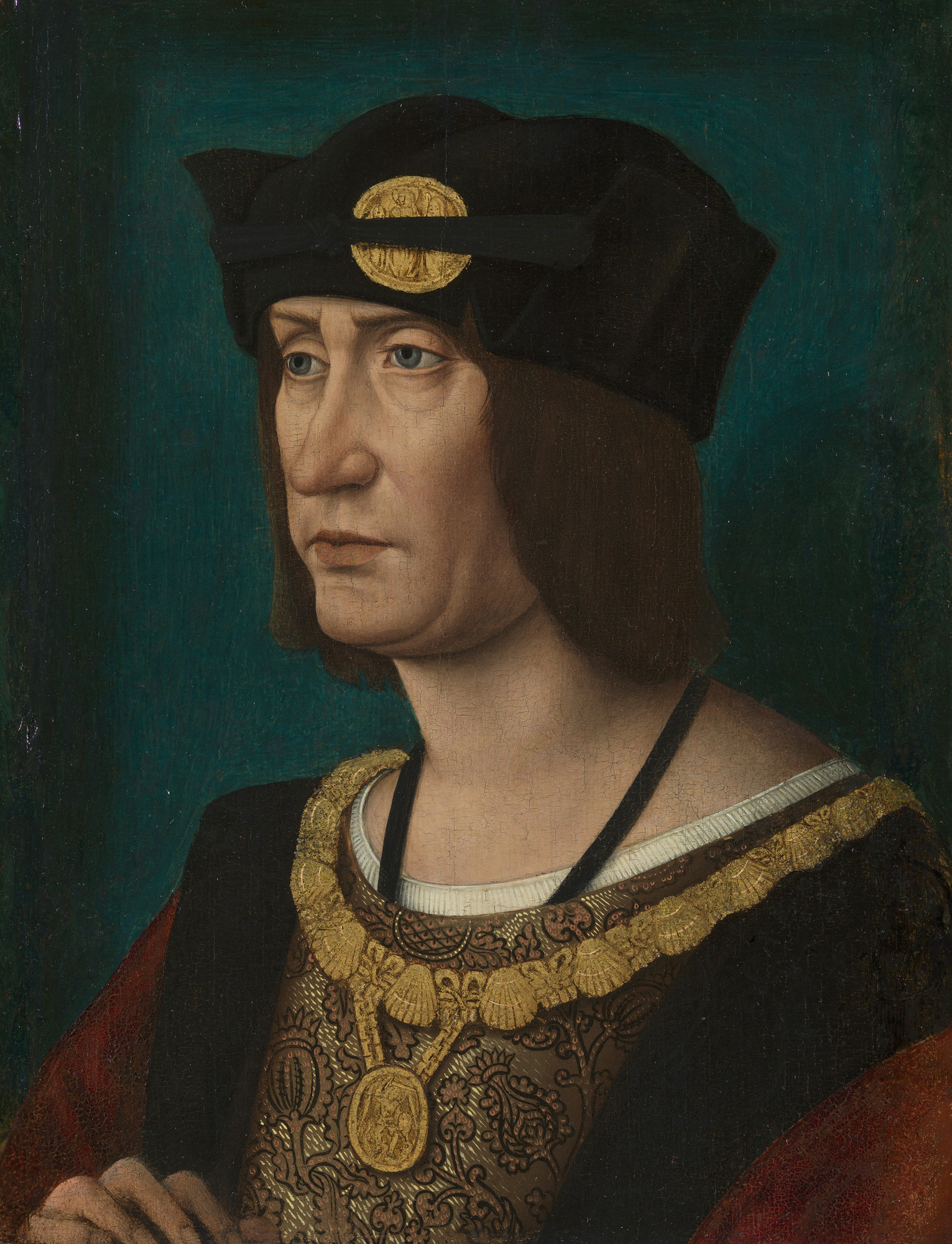
Josquin probably served under Louis XII, who had captured the Sforzas, his previous employers.

Documents found since the late 20th century have shed some light on Josquin's life and works between 1494 and 1503; at some point he was ordained a priest. In August 1494 he went to Cambrai, as attested by a vin d'honneur (lit. 'wine of honor') record, and he may have returned to Rome soon after. From then to 1498 there is no firm evidence for his activities; Fallows suggests he stayed in Cambrai for these four years, citing Johannes Manlius's 1562 book Locorum communium collectanea, which associates Josquin with Cambrai's musical establishment. This assertion would fit with Josquin's possible youthful connections in Cambrai and later vin d'honneur there. Manlius cites the reformer Philip Melanchthon as the source for many of his stories, strengthening the authenticity of his Josquin anecdotes; Melanchthon was close to musical figures of his time, including the publisher Georg Rhau and the composer Adrianus Petit Coclico.

Two letters between members of the House of Gonzaga and Ascanio Sforza suggest that Josquin may have re-entered the service of the Sforza family in Milan around 1498; they refer to a servant Juschino who delivered the hunting dogs to the Gonzagas. Circumstantial evidence suggests Juschino may have been Josquin des Prez, but he is not known to have been qualified for such a task, and it would be unusual to refer to him as a servant rather than a musician or singer. Josquin probably did not stay in Milan long, since his former employers were captured during Louis XII's 1499 invasion. Before he left, he most likely wrote two secular compositions, the well-known frottola El Grillo ("The Cricket"), and In te Domine speravi ("I have placed my hope in you, Lord"), based on Psalm 31. The latter might be a veiled reference to the religious reformer Girolamo Savonarola, who had been burned at the stake in Florence in 1498, and for whom Josquin seems to have had a special reverence; the text was Savonarola's favorite psalm, a meditation on which he left unfinished in prison when he was executed.

Josquin was probably in France during the early 16th century; documents found in 2008 indicate that he visited Troyes twice between 1499 and 1501. The long doubted account from Hémeré that Josquin had a canonry at Saint-Quentin was confirmed by documentary evidence that he had exchanged it by 30 May 1503. Canonries at Saint-Quentin were almost always gifts from the French king to royal household members, suggesting Josquin had been employed by Louis XII. According to Glarean in the Dodecachordon of 1547, the motet Memor esto verbi tui servo tuo ("Remember thy promise unto thy servant") was composed as a gentle reminder to the king to keep his promise of a benefice to Josquin. Glarean claimed that on receiving the benefice, Josquin wrote a motet on the text Bonitatem fecisti cum servo tuo, Domine ("Lord, thou hast dealt graciously with thy servant") to show his gratitude to the king, either Louis XI or Louis XII. Although such a motet survives and is mentioned with Josquin's Memor esto in many sources, Bonitatem fecisti is now attributed to Carpentras. Some of Josquin's other compositions have been tentatively dated to his French period, such as Vive le roy, and In exitu Israel, which resembles the style of other composers of the French court. The five-voice De profundis, a setting of Psalm 130, seems to have been written for a royal funeral, perhaps that of Louis XII, Anne of Brittany or Philip I of Castile.

=== Ferrara ===
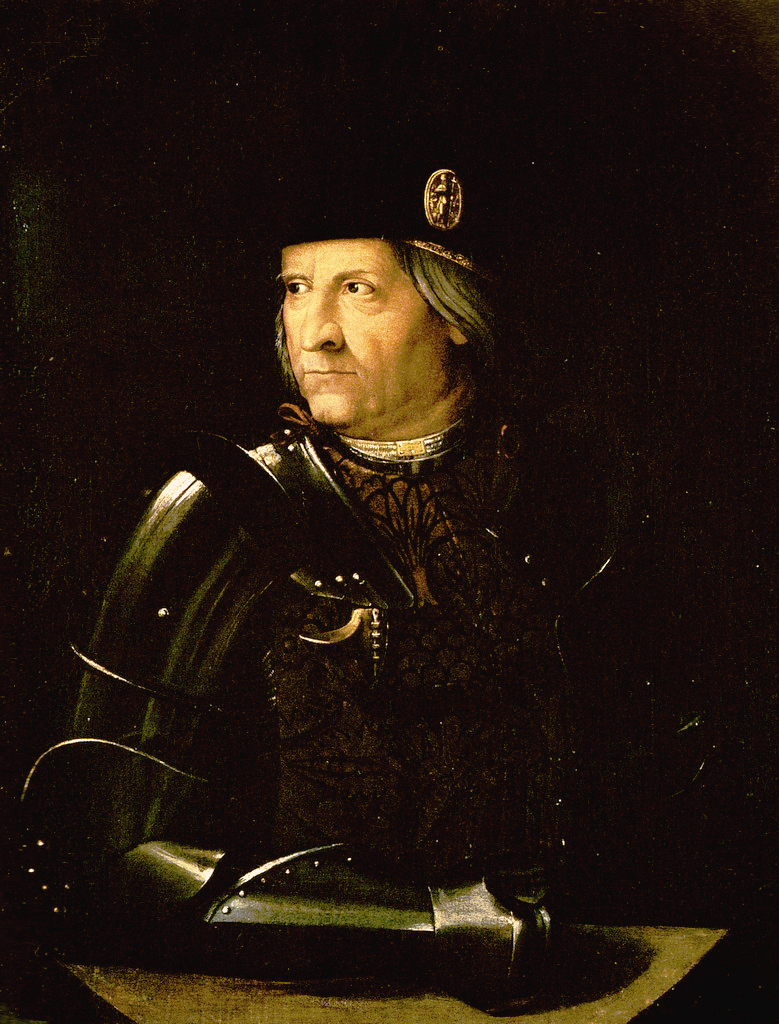
Ercole I d'Este, an important patron of the arts, was Josquin's employer during 1503–1504.

Josquin arrived in Ferrara by 30 May 1503, to serve Ercole I d'Este, Duke of Ferrara, an arts patron who had been trying for many years to replace the composer and choirmaster Johannes Martini, who had recently died. No extant documents record Josquin as having worked in Ferrara before, though his earlier associations with Ercole suggest prior employment there; he signed a deed indicating he did not intend to stay there for long. Ercole is known to have met with Josquin's former employer Louis XII throughout 1499 to 1502, and these meetings may have led to his service for the Duke. Two letters survive explaining the circumstances of his arrival, both from courtiers who scouted musical talent in the service of Ercole. The first of these was from Girolamo da Sestola (nicknamed "Coglia") to Ercole, explaining: "My lord, I believe that there is neither lord nor king who will now have a better chapel than yours if your lordship sends for Josquin [...] and by having Josquin in our chapel I want to place a crown upon this chapel of ours" (14 August 1502). The second letter, from the courtier Gian de Artiganova, criticized Josquin and suggested Heinrich Isaac instead:

"To me [Isaac] seems well suited to serve your lordship, more so than Josquin, because he is more good-natured and companionable, and will compose new works more often. It is true that Josquin composes better, but he composes when he wants to and not when one wants him to, and he is asking 200 ducats in salary while Isaac will come for 120—but your lordship will decide."

— Gian de Artiganova to Ercole I d'Este, 2 September 1502

Around three months later, Josquin was chosen; his salary of 200 ducats was the highest ever for a ducal chapel member. The Artiganova letter is a unique source for Josquin's personality, and the musicologist Patrick Macey interprets it as meaning he was a "difficult colleague and that he took an independent attitude towards producing music for his patrons". Edward Lowinsky connected his purportedly difficult behavior with musical talent, and used the letter as evidence that Josquin's contemporaries recognized his genius. Musicologist Rob Wegman questions whether meaningful conclusions can be drawn from such an anecdote. In a later publication, Wegman notes the largely unprecedented nature of such a position and warns "yet of course the letter could equally well be seen to reflect the attitudes and expectations of its recipient, Ercole d'Este".

While in Ferrara, Josquin wrote some of his most famous compositions, including the austere, Savonarola-influenced Miserere mei, Deus, which became one of the most widely distributed motets of the 16th century. Also probably from this period was the virtuoso motet Virgo salutiferi, set to a poem by Ercole Strozzi, and O virgo prudentissima based on a poem by Poliziano. Due to its stylistic resemblance to Miserere and Virgo salutiferi, the Missa Hercules Dux Ferrariae is also attributed to this time; it was previously thought to have been written in the early 1480s. (Note: Fallows cites Lewis Lockwood, Joshua Rifkin, Jeremy Noble and Christopher Reynolds as supporting the later dating, against the "received view" that it was composed much earlier. Its structure has been used to date it to both the 1480s and the early 1500s, depending on whether the rigidity of the tenor was interpreted as a sign of immaturity or mastery. In the end, evidence of style, biography and transmission all point toward 1503/4 as the most likely composition date.) Josquin did not stay in Ferrara long. An outbreak of the plague in 1503 prompted the evacuation of the Duke and his family, as well as two-thirds of the citizens, and Josquin left by April 1504. His replacement, Obrecht, died of the plague in mid-1505.

=== Condé ===
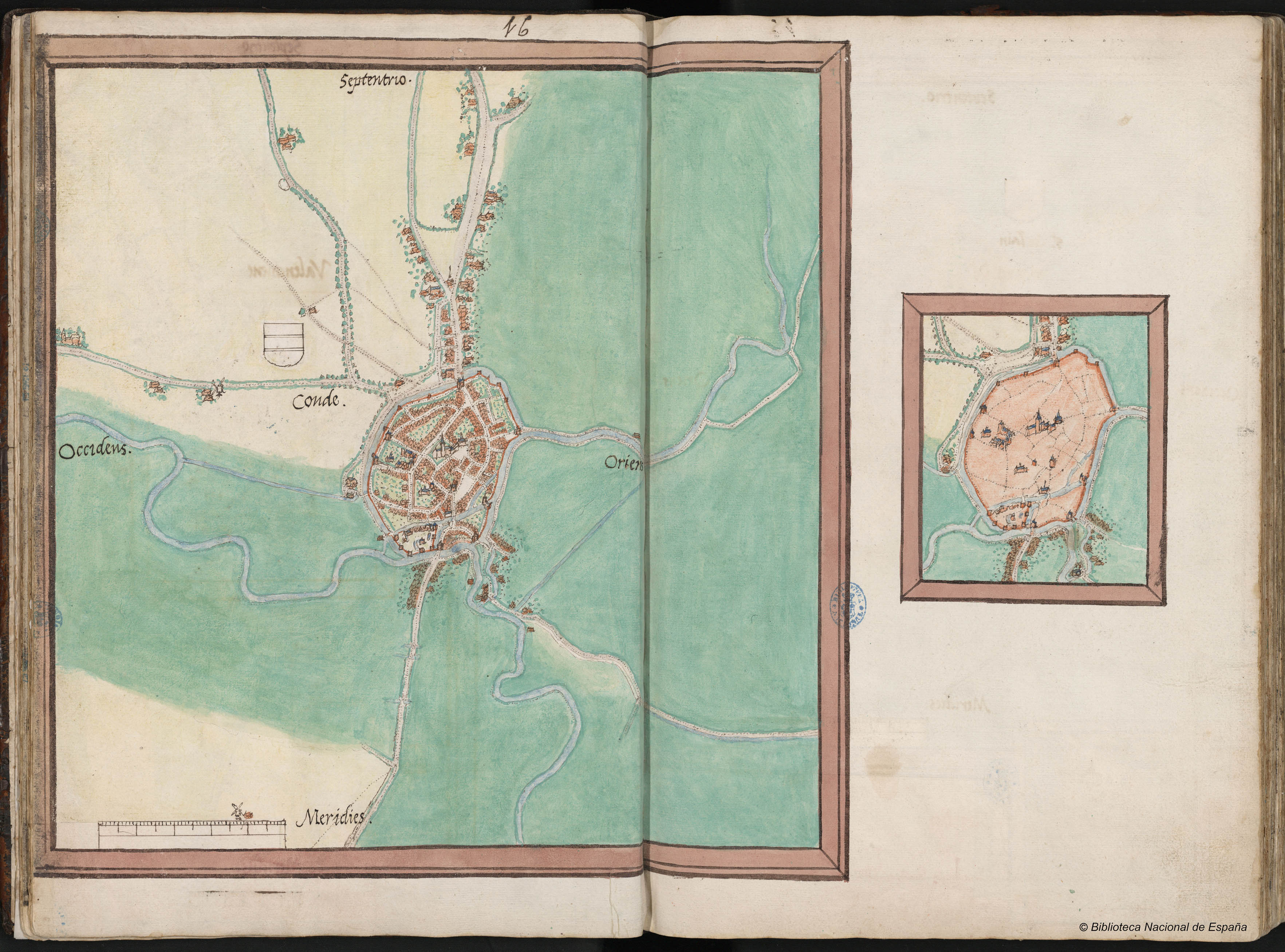
A 1545 map of Condé-sur-l'Escaut by Jacob van Deventer

Josquin probably moved from Ferrara to his home region of Condé-sur-l'Escaut, and became provost of the collegiate church of Notre-Dame on 3 May 1504; he may have obtained the post from Philip I's sponsorship. His role gave him political responsibility, and put him in charge of a workforce which included a dean, a treasurer, 25 canons, 18 chaplains, 16 vicars, 6 choir-boys and other priests. This was an appealing place for his old age: it was near his birthplace, had a renowned choir and was the leading musical establishment in Hainaut, besides St. Vincent at Soignies and Cambrai Cathedral. Very few records of his activity survive from this time; he bought a house in September 1504, and sold it (or a different one) in November 1508. (Note: The chapter at Bourges Cathedral asked him to become master of the choirboys there in 1508, but it is not known how he responded, and there is no record of him working there; most scholars presume he remained in Condé.) The Josquin mentioned may be the Joskin who traveled to present chansons to Charles V, Holy Roman Emperor in Brussels or Mechelen.

In his later years Josquin composed many of his most admired works. They include the masses Missa de Beata Virgine and Missa Pange lingua; the motets Benedicta es, Inviolata, Pater noster–Ave Maria and Praeter rerum seriem; and the chansons Mille regretz, Nimphes, nappés and Plus nulz regretz. The last of these, Plus nulz regretz, is set to a poem by Jean Lemaire de Belges that celebrates the future engagement between Charles V and Mary Tudor. In his last years Josquin's music saw European-wide dissemination through publications by the printer Ottaviano Petrucci. Josquin's compositions were given a prominent place by Petrucci, and were reissued numerous times.

On his deathbed, Josquin left an endowment for the performance of his work, Pater noster, at all general processions when townsfolk passed his house, stopping to place a wafer on the marketplace altar to the Holy Virgin. He died on 27 August 1521 and left his possessions to Condé's chapter of Notre Dame. He was buried in front of the church's high altar, but his tomb was destroyed, either during the French Wars of Religion (1562–1598) or in 1793 when the church was demolished amid the French Revolution.

== Music ==
Josquin's four-voice motet Domine, ne in furore was written c. 1480. It includes one voice presenting a short motive, which is subsequently imitated by other voices.

Josquin was a professional singer throughout his life, and his compositions are almost exclusively vocal. He wrote in primarily three genres: the mass, motet, and chanson (with French text). In his 50-year career, Josquin's body of work is larger than that of any other composer of his period, besides perhaps Isaac and Obrecht. Establishing a chronology of his compositions is difficult; the sources in which they were published offer little evidence, and historical and contextual connections are meager. Few manuscripts of Josquin's music date from before the 16th century, due to, according to Noble, "time, war and enthusiasm (both religious and anti-religious)". Identifying earlier works is particularly difficult, and later works only occasionally offer any more certainty. The musicologist Richard Taruskin writes that modern scholarship is "still nowhere near a wholly reliable chronology and unlikely ever to reach it", and suggests that the current tentative models "tell us more about ourselves, and the way in which we come to know what we know, than they do about Josquin".

After Du Fay died in 1474, Josquin and his contemporaries lived in a musical world of frequent stylistic change, in part due to the movement of musicians between different regions of Europe. A line of musicologists credits Josquin with three primary developments:

1. The gradual departure from extensive melismatic lines, and emphasis instead on smaller motifs. These "motivic cells" were short, easily recognizable melodic fragments which passed from one voice to another in a contrapuntal texture, giving it an inner unity.
2. The increasingly prominent use of imitative polyphony, equally between voices, which "combines a rational and homogeneous integration of the musical space with a self-renewing rhythmic impetus".
3. A focus on the text, with the music serving to emphasize its meaning, an early form of word painting.

The musicologist Jeremy Noble concludes that these innovations demonstrate the transition from the earlier music of Du Fay and Ockeghem, to Josquin's successors Adrian Willaert and Jacques Arcadelt, and eventually to the late Renaissance composers Giovanni Pierluigi da Palestrina and Orlande de Lassus.

=== Masses ===
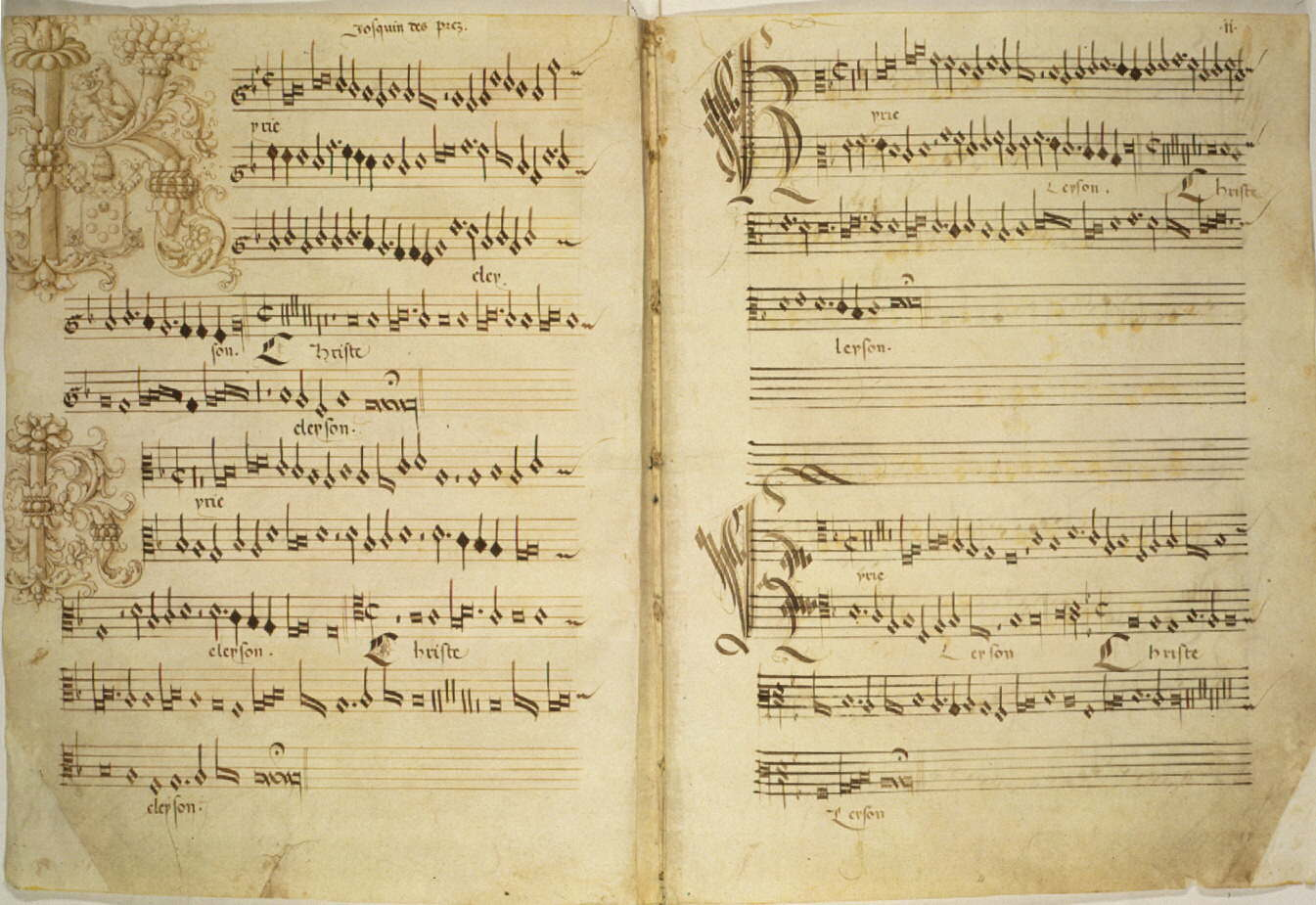
Manuscript showing the opening Kyrie of the Missa de Beata Virgine, a late work. Rome, Biblioteca Apostolica Vaticana, Capp. Sist. 45, ff. 1v-2r.

The mass is the central rite of the Catholic Church, and polyphonic settings of the ordinary of the mass—the Kyrie, Gloria, Credo, Sanctus and Agnus Dei—increased in popularity in the 14th century. From the 15th century, composers treated it as a central genre in Western classical music in accordance with greater demand. By Josquin's time, masses were generally standardized into substantial, polyphonic five-movement works, making it difficult for composers to satisfy both liturgical and musical demands. Previous examples in the genre by composers such as Du Fay and Ockeghem were widely admired and emulated.

Josquin and Obrecht led an intensive development of the genre. Josquin's masses are generally less progressive than his motets—though he is credited with numerous innovations in the genre. His less radical approach may be explained by most of the masses being earlier works, or the structural and textual limitations of the genre. Almost all are for four voices.

The Josquin Companion categorizes the composer's masses into the following styles:

- Canonic masses, which contains one or more voices derived from another via strict imitation;
- Cantus firmus masses, in which a pre-existing tune appears in one voice of the texture, with the other voices being more or less freely composed;
- Paraphrase masses, based on a popular monophonic song which is used freely in all voices, and in many variations;
- Parody masses, based on a polyphonic song, which appears in whole or in part, with material from all voices in use, not just the tune; and
- Solmization masses, named soggetto cavato by Zarlino, in which the base tune is drawn from the syllables of a name or phrase.

Josquin began his career at a time when composers started to find strict cantus firmus masses limiting. He pioneered paraphrase and parody masses, which were not well established before the 16th century. Many of his works combine the cantus firmus style with paraphrase and parody, making strict categorization problematic. Reflecting on Josquin's masses, Noble notes that "In general his instinct, at least in his mature works, seems to be to extract as much variety as possible from his given musical material, sacred or secular, by any appropriate means."

==== Canonic masses ====
Opening of Josquin's Missa sine nomine

Josquin's predecessors and contemporaries wrote masses based on canonic imitation. The canonic voices in these masses derive from pre-existing melodies such as the "L'homme armé" song (Faugues, Compère and Forestier), or chant (Fevin and La Rue's Missae de feria). Josquin's two canonic masses are not based on existing tunes, and so stand apart from the mainstream. They are closer to the Missa prolationum written by Ockeghem, and Missa ad fugam by de Orto, both of which use original melodies in all the voices.

Josquin's two canonic masses were published in Petrucci's third book of Josquin masses in 1514; the Missa ad fugam is the earlier of the two. It has a head-motif consisting of the whole first Kyrie which is repeated in the beginning of all five movements. The canon is restricted to the highest voice, and the pitch interval between the voices is fixed while the temporal interval varies between only two values; the two free voices generally do not participate in the imitation. The precise relationship of Josquin's mass to de Orto's is uncertain, as is Josquin's authorship of the mass.

No questions of authenticity cloud the Missa sine nomine, written during Josquin's final years in Condé. In contrast to the inflexibility of the canonic scheme in the Missa ad fugam, the temporal and pitch interval of the canon, along with the voices that participate in it, are varied throughout. The free voices are more fully integrated into the texture, and frequently participate in imitation with the canonic voices, sometimes preemptively.

==== Cantus firmus masses ====
Prior to Josquin's mature period, the most common technique for writing masses was the cantus firmus, a technique which had been in use for most of the 15th century. Josquin used the technique early in his career, with the Missa L'ami Baudichon considered to be one of his earliest masses. This mass is based on a secular tune similar to "Three Blind Mice". Basing a mass on such a source was an accepted procedure, as evidenced by the existence of the mass in Sistine Chapel part-books copied during the papacy of Julius II (1503–1513).

Josquin's most famous cantus firmus masses are the two based on the "L'homme armé" (lit. 'the armed man'), a popular tune for mass composition throughout the Renaissance. Though both are relatively mature compositions, they are very different. Missa L'homme armé super voces musicales, is a technical tour-de-force on the tune, containing numerous mensuration canons and contrapuntal display. Throughout the work, the melody is presented on each note of the natural hexachord: C, D, E, F, G and A. The later Missa L'homme armé sexti toni is a "fantasia on the theme of the armed man." While based on a cantus firmus, it is also a paraphrase mass, for fragments of the tune appear in all voices; throughout the work the melody appears in a wide variety of tempos and rhythms. Technically it is almost restrained, compared to the other L'homme armé mass, until the closing Agnus Dei, which contains a complex canonic structure including a rare retrograde canon, around which other voices are woven.

==== Paraphrase masses ====
Paraphrase masses by Josquin

Early works

- Missa Ave maris stella
- Missa Gaudeamus

Later works

- Missa de Beata Virgine
- Missa Pange lingua

The paraphrase mass differed from the cantus firmus technique in that the source material, though still monophonic, could be (by Josquin's time) highly embellished, often with ornaments. As in the cantus firmus technique, the source tune may appear in many voices of the mass. Several of Josquin's masses feature the paraphrase technique, such as the early Missa Gaudeamus, which also includes cantus firmus and canonic elements. The Missa Ave maris stella, also probably an early work, paraphrases the Marian antiphon of the same name; it is one of his shortest masses. The late Missa de Beata Virgine paraphrases plainchants in praise of the Virgin Mary. As a Lady Mass, it is a votive mass for Saturday performance, and was his most popular mass in the 16th century.

The best known of Josquin's paraphrase masses, and one of the most famous mass settings of the Renaissance, is the Missa Pange lingua, based on a hymn by Thomas Aquinas for the Vespers of Corpus Christi. It was probably the last mass Josquin composed. This mass is an extended fantasia on the tune, using the melody in all voices and all parts of the mass, in elaborate and ever-changing polyphony. One of the high points of the mass is the et incarnatus est section of the Credo, where the texture becomes homophonic, and the tune appears in the topmost voice. Here the portion which would normally set—"Sing, O my tongue, of the mystery of the divine body"—is instead given the words "And he became incarnate by the Holy Ghost from the Virgin Mary, and was made man." Noble comments that "The vigour of the earlier masses can still be felt in the rhythms and the strong drive to cadences, perhaps more so than in the Missa de Beata Virgine, but essentially the two contrasting strains of Josquin's music—fantasy and intellectual control—are so blended and balanced in these two works that one can see in them the beginnings of a new style: one which reconciles the conflicting aims of the great 15th-century composers in a new synthesis that was in essence to remain valid for the whole of the 16th century."

==== Parody masses ====
Parody masses by Josquin

- Missa Di dadi (Morton)
- Missa D'ung aultre amer (Ockeghem)
- Missa Faisant regretz (Frye)
- Missa Fortuna desperata (? (Note: The song survives anonymously in most sources. The attribution to Busnois, which exists in a single late source, is not generally accepted.))
- Missa Malheur me bat (Martini or Malcourt)
- Missa Mater Patris (Brumel)

Du Fay was one of the first to write masses based on secular songs (a parody mass), and his Missa Se la face ay pale, dates to the decade of Josquin's birth. By the turn of the 16th century, composers were moving from quoting single voice lines, to widen their reference to all voices in the piece. This was part of the transition from the medieval cantus firmus mass, where the voice bearing the preexisting melody stood aloof from the others, to the Renaissance parody masses, where all the voices formed an integrated texture. In such masses, the source material was not a single line, but motifs and points of imitation from all voices within a polyphonic work. By the time Josquin died, these parody masses had become well established and Josquin's works demonstrate the variety of methods in musical borrowing during this transition period.

Six works are generally attributed to Josquin which borrow from polyphonic pieces, two of which also include canonic features. One of these—the Missa Di dadi, which includes a canon in the "Benedictus"—is based on a chanson by Robert Morton and has the rhythmic augmentation of the borrowed tenor part indicated by dice faces, which are printed next to the staff. Canon can also be found in the "Osanna" of the Missa Faisant regretz which is based on Walter Frye's Tout a par moy. The Missa Fortuna desperata is based on the popular three-voice Italian song Fortuna desperata. In this mass, Josquin used each of the Italian song's voices as cantus firmi, varying throughout the work. A similar variation in the source material's voices is used in the Missa Malheur me bat, based on a chanson variously attributed to Martini or Abertijne Malcourt. The dating of Missa Malheur me bat remains controversial, with some scholars calling it an early composition, and others a later one. The Missa Mater Patris, based on a three-voice motet by Antoine Brumel, is probably the earliest true parody mass by any composer, as it no longer contains any hint of a cantus firmus. Missa D'ung aultre amer is based on a popular chanson of the same name by Ockeghem, and is one of Josquin's shortest masses. (Note: Both the Missa Mater Patris and the Missa D'ung aultre amer may be spurious works; they were both rejected by Noble, but accepted by the editors of the New Josquin Edition.)

==== Solmization mass ====
A solmization mass is a polyphonic mass which uses notes drawn from a word or phrase. The style is first described by Zarlino in 1558, who called it soggetto cavato, from soggetto cavato dalle parole, meaning "carved out of the words". The earliest known mass by any composer using solmization syllables is the Missa Hercules Dux Ferrariae, which Josquin wrote for Ercole I. It is based on a cantus firmus of musical syllables of the Duke's name, 'Ercole, Duke of Ferrara', which in Latin is 'Hercules Dux Ferrarie'. Taking the solmization syllables with the same vowels gives: Re–Ut–Re–Ut–Re–Fa–Mi–Re, which is D–C–D–C–D–F–E–D in modern nomenclature. The Missa Hercules Dux Ferrariae remains the best known work to use this device and was published by Petrucci in 1505, relatively soon after its composition. Taruskin notes that the use of Ercole's name is Josquin's method of memorialization for his patron, akin to a portrait painting.

The other Josquin mass to prominently use this technique is the Missa La sol fa re mi, based on the musical syllables contained in 'laisse faire moy' ("let me take care of it"). Essentially the entire mass's content is related to this phrase, and the piece is thus something of an ostinato. The traditional story, as told by Glarean in 1547, was that an unknown aristocrat used to order suitors away with this phrase, and Josquin immediately wrote an "exceedingly elegant" mass on it as a jab at him. Scholars have proposed different origins for the piece; Lowinsky has connected it to the court of Ascanio Sforza, and the art historian Dawson Kiang connected it to the Turkish prince Cem Sultan's promise to the pope to overthrow his brother Bayezid II.

=== Motets ===
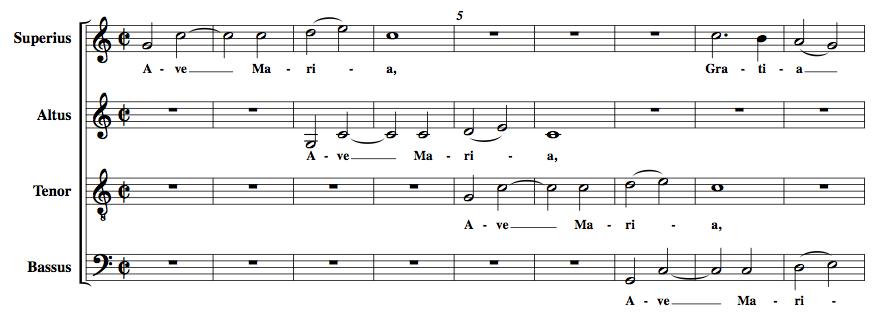
The opening passage from Josquin's motet Ave Maria ... Virgo serena, showing imitative counterpoint between the four voices

Josquin's motets are his most celebrated and influential works. Their style varies considerably, but can generally be divided into homophonic settings with block chords and syllabic text declamation; ornate—and often imitative—contrapuntal fantasias in which the text is overshadowed by music; and psalm settings which combined these extremes with the addition of rhetorical figures and text-painting that foreshadowed the later development of the madrigal. He wrote most of them for four voices, which had become the compositional norm by the mid-15th century, and descended from the four-part writing of Guillaume de Machaut and John Dunstaple in the late Middle Ages. Josquin was also a considerable innovator in writing motets for five and six voices.

Many of the motets use compositional constraint on the process; others are freely composed. Some use a cantus firmus as a unifying device, some are canonic, others use a motto which repeats throughout, and some use several of these methods. In some motets which use canon, it is designed to be heard and appreciated as such; in others a canon is present, but difficult to hear. Josquin frequently used imitation in writing his motets, with sections akin to fugal expositions occurring on successive lines of the text he was setting. This is prominent in his motet Ave Maria ... Virgo serena, an early work where each voice enters by restating the line sung before it. Other early works such as a Alma Redemptoris mater/Ave regina caelorum show prominent imitation, as do later ones such as his setting of Dominus regnavit (Psalm 93) for four voices. Josquin favored the technique throughout his career.

Few composers before Josquin had written polyphonic psalm settings, and these form a large proportion of his later motets. Josquin's settings include the famous Miserere (Psalm 51); Memor esto verbi tui, based on Psalm 119; and two settings of De profundis (Psalm 130), which are often considered to be among his most significant accomplishments. Josquin wrote several examples of a new type of piece developed in Milan, the motet-chanson. Though similar to 15th-century works based on the formes fixes mold which were completely secular, Josquin's motet-chansons contained a chant-derived Latin cantus firmus in the lowest of the three voices. The other voices sang a secular French text, which had either a symbolic relationship to the sacred Latin text, or commented on it. Josquin's three known motet-chansons are Que vous madame/In pace, A la mort/Monstra te esse matrem and Fortune destrange plummaige/Pauper sum ego.

=== Secular music ===
El grillo
Sung by the dwsChorale

Josquin left numerous French chansons, for three to six voices, some of which were probably intended for instrumental performance as well. In his chansons, he often used a cantus firmus, sometimes a popular song whose origin can no longer be traced, as in Si j'avoye Marion. In other works he used a tune originally associated with a separate text, or freely composed an entire song, using no apparent external source material. Another technique Josquin used was to take a popular song and write it as a canon with itself, in two inner voices, and write new melodic material above and around it, to a new text: he did this in one of his most famous chansons, Faulte d'argent.

Josquin's earliest chansons were probably composed in northern Europe, under the influence of composers such as Ockeghem and Busnois. Unlike them, he never adhered strictly to the conventions of the formes fixes—the rigid and complex repetition patterns of the rondeau, virelai, and ballade—instead he often wrote his early chansons in strict imitation, as with many of his sacred works. He was one of the first to write chansons with all voices equal parts of the texture, and many contain points of imitation, similar to his motets. He also used melodic repetition, especially where the lines of text rhymed, and many of his chansons had a lighter texture and faster tempo than his motets. Some of his chansons were almost certainly designed to be performed with instruments; Petrucci published many of them without text, and some of the pieces (for example, the fanfare-like Vive le roy) contain writing more idiomatic for instruments than voices. Josquin's most famous chansons circulated widely in Europe; some of the better-known include his lament on the death of Ockeghem, Nymphes des bois/Requiem aeternam; Mille regretz, an uncertain attribution to Josquin; (Note: See Fallows (2001, pp. 214–252) and Litterick (2000, pp. 374–376) for information on the attribution issues surrounding Mille regretz) Nimphes, nappés; and Plus nulz regretz.

Josquin also wrote at least three pieces in the manner of the frottola, a popular Italian song form which he would have heard during his years in Milan. These songs include Scaramella, El grillo and In te domine speravi. They are even simpler in texture than his French chansons, being almost uniformly syllabic and homophonic, and they remain among his most frequently performed pieces.

== Portraits ==
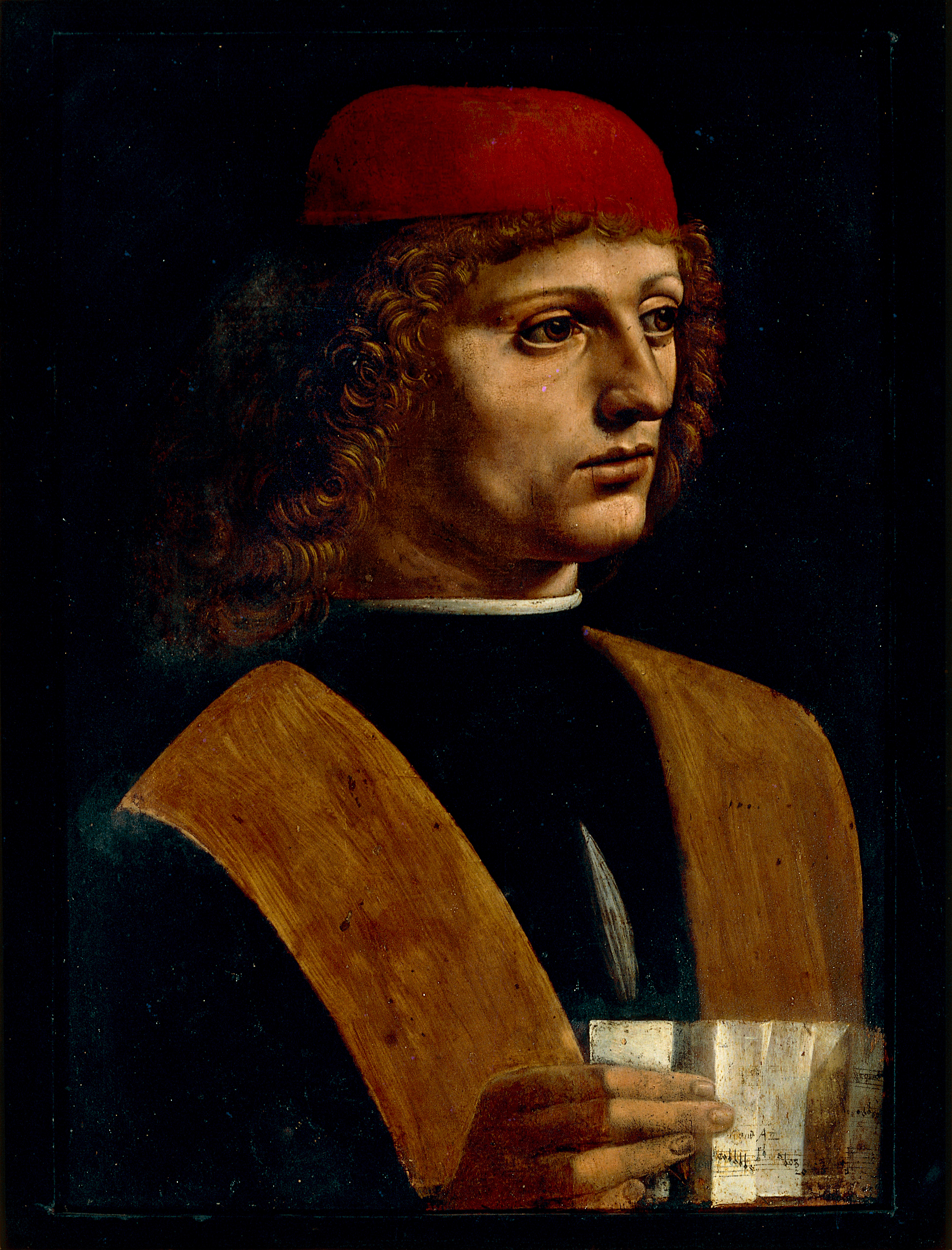
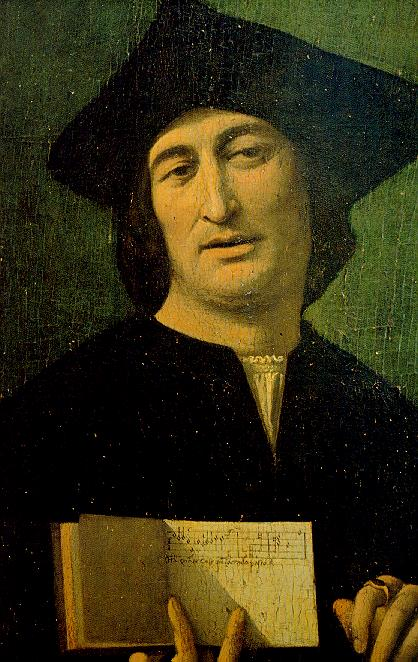
(Left) The Portrait of a Musician by Leonardo da Vinci, mid 1480s, in which Josquin has been tentatively proposed as the sitter (Right) Early 16th-century painting attributed to Filippo Mazzola, with a man holding the canon by Josquin. It may depict Josquin or Nicolò Burzio.

A small woodcut portraying Josquin is the most reproduced image of any Renaissance composer. Printed in Petrus Opmeer's 1611 Opus chronographicum orbis universi, the woodcut is the earliest known depiction of Josquin and presumably based on an oil painting which Opmeer says was kept in the collegiate church of St. Goedele. Church documents discovered in the 1990s have corroborated Opmeer's statement about the painting's existence. It may have been painted during Josquin's lifetime and was owned by Petrus Jacobi (d. 1568), a cantor and organist at the Church of St. Michael and St. Gudula (now Brussels' cathedral). Following the will's instructions, the altarpiece was placed next to Jacobi's tomb, but it was destroyed in the late 16th century by Protestant iconoclasts. Whether the woodcut is a realistic likeness of the oil painting remains uncertain; Elders notes that comparisons between contemporaneous woodcuts based on original paintings that do survive often show incompetent realizations, putting the accuracy of the woodcut in question.

The Portrait of a Musician, widely attributed to Leonardo da Vinci, (Note: The Portrait of a Musician has a complex and controversial history of attribution (see §Attribution) but modern scholarship has secured at least a partial attribution to Leonardo. Fallows noted in 2020 that "no scholar in the last thirty years has disputed Leonardo's authorship, at least for the main body of the general painting.") depicts a man holding sheet music, which has led many scholars to identify him as a musician. The work is usually dated to the mid-1480s, and numerous candidates have been proposed, including Franchinus Gaffurius and Atalante Migliorotti, though none have achieved wide approval. In 1972, the Belgian musicologist Suzanne Clercx-Lejeune argued the subject is Josquin; she interpreted the words on the sitter's sheet music as "Cont" (an abbreviation of "Contratenor"), "Cantuz" (Cantus) and "A Z" (an abbreviation of "Altuz"), and she identified the music as Josquin's llibata Dei Virgo nutrix. Several factors make this unlikely: the painting does not resemble the Opmeer portrait, the notation is largely illegible, and as a priest in his mid-thirties Josquin does not seem like the younger layman in the portrait. Fallows disagrees, noting that "a lot of new details point to Josquin, who was the right age, in the right place, had already served at least two kings, and was now rich enough to have his portrait painted by the best", but concludes that "we shall probably never know who Leonardo's musician was".

A portrait from the early 16th century kept in the Galleria nazionale di Parma is often related to Josquin. It is usually attributed to Filippo Mazzola, and is thought to depict the Italian music theorist Nicolò Burzio, though neither the attribution nor sitter are certain. The man in the painting is holding an altered version of Josquin's canon Guillaume se va chauffer. Fallows notes that the subject has similar facial features to the portrait printed by Opmeer, but concludes that there is not enough evidence to conclude Josquin is the sitter. Clercx-Lejeune also suggested Josquin was depicted in Jean Perréal's fresco of the liberal arts in Le Puy Cathedral, but this has not achieved acceptance from other scholars. An 1881 painting by Charles-Gustave Housez depicts Josquin; it was created long after the composer's death, but Clercx-Lejeune has contended that it is an older portrait which Housez restored and modified.

== Legacy ==
=== Influence ===
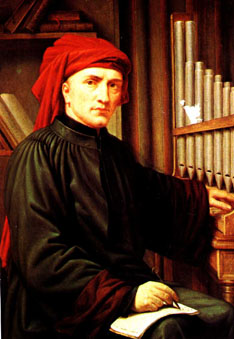
Imaginary Josquin portrait by Housez, 1881

Elders described Josquin as "the first composer in the history of Western music not to have been forgotten after his death", while John Milsom called him "the towering composer of the Renaissance". Fallows wrote that his influence on 16th century European music is comparable to that of Beethoven on the 19th and Igor Stravinsky on the 20th century. Comparisons with Beethoven are particularly common, though Taruskin cautions that:

"Drawing parallels between [Josquin and Beethoven] is easy; doing so has become traditional in music historiography. Unease with this tradition has occasionally been expressed by those who see in it a danger to an unprejudiced view of Josquin and his time [...] To think of Josquin merely as a fifteenth- or sixteenth-century Beethoven would be like placing him behind the nearer figure and thereby obscuring him from view."

His popularity led to imitation by fellow composers, and some publishers (especially in Germany) misattributed works to him after his death to meet the demand for new Josquin compositions. This inspired a well-known remark that "now that Josquin is dead, he is producing more compositions than when he was still alive". (Note: The remark is variously attributed to the music publisher Georg Forster in 1540 by Elders (2013, p. 30), and to Martin Luther by Macey et al. (2011, §9 "Reputation").) Fallows asserts that the issue was more complex than publishers attempting to increase their profits: similar names of composers and compositions caused confusion, as did works which quoted Josquin, or student works which imitated his style. Josquin's pupils may have included Jean Lhéritier and Nicolas Gombert; Coclico claimed to be his student, though his statements are notoriously unreliable.

Numerous composers wrote laments after his death, three of which were published by Tielman Susato in a 1545 edition of Josquin's music. (Note: Composers writing laments for fellow composers was a long-standing tradition in medieval and Renaissance music. Earlier examples include F. Andrieu's Armes, amours/O flour des flours (1377) for Machaut, Ockeghem's Mort, tu as navré de ton dart (1460) for Binchois and Josquin's own Nymphes des bois (1497) for Ockeghem. See Rice (1999, p. 31) for a complete list of extant medieval and Renaissance laments.) These included works by Benedictus Appenzeller, Gombert, Jacquet of Mantua and Jheronimus Vinders, as well as the anonymous Absolve, quaesumus, while Jean Richafort's requiem musically quoted him. Josquin's compositions traveled widely after his death, more so than those of Du Fay, Ockeghem and Obrecht combined. Surviving copies of his motets and masses in Spanish cathedrals date from the mid-16th century, and the Sistine Chapel is known to have performed his works regularly throughout the late 16th century and into the 17th. Instrumental arrangements of his works were often published from the 1530s to the 1590s. Josquin was described by Taruskin as the "master architect" of High Renaissance music, and his compositions were parodied or quoted throughout Europe by almost every major composer of the later Renaissance, including Arcadelt, Brumel, Bartolomé de Escobedo, Antoine de Févin, Robert de Févin, George de La Hèle, Lupus Hellinck, Pierre Hesdin, Lassus, Jacquet, Claudio Merulo, Philippe de Monte, Pierre Moulu, Philippe Rogier, Palestrina, Cipriano de Rore, Nicola Vicentino and Willaert.

=== Reputation ===
==== Commendation, decline and reconsideration ====
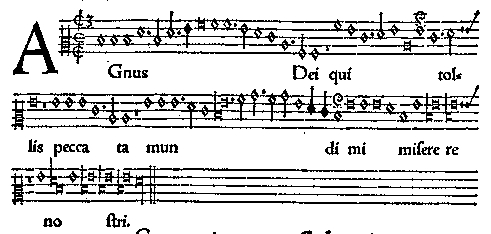
Agnus Dei II, from Josquin's Missa L'homme armé super voces musicales, as reprinted in the Dodecachordon of Heinrich Glarean

There is little information on Josquin's reputation during his lifetime. His composition of masses was commended by Paolo Cortesi, and the poet Jean Molinet and the music theorists Gaffurius and Pietro Aron wrote about his works. Josquin's popularity during his lifetime is also suggested by publications: Petrucci's Misse Josquin of 1502 was the first single-composer mass anthology, and Josquin was the only composer whose masses merited a second and a third volume. Fallows asserts that Josquin gained European renown between 1494 and 1503, since the Petrucci publications and references by Gaffurius and Molinet occurred during this time. After Josquin's death, humanists such as Cosimo Bartoli, Baldassare Castiglione and François Rabelais praised him, with Bartoli describing him as Michelangelo's equal in music. Josquin was championed by the later theorists Heinrich Glarean and Gioseffo Zarlino, and the theologian Martin Luther declared "he is the master of the notes. They must do as he wills; as for the other composers, they have to do as the notes will."

Upon the emergence of Baroque music in the 17th century, Josquin's dominance began to lessen. He was overshadowed by Palestrina, who dominated the pre-common practice period musical narrative, and whose compositions were considered the summit of polyphonic refinement. Until the 20th century, discussion of Josquin's music was mainly limited to music scholars such as the theorists Angelo Berardi in the 1680s–1690s, and Johann Gottfried Walther in 1732. The late 18th century saw a new interest in Netherlandish music: studies from Charles Burney, Johann Nikolaus Forkel, Raphael Georg Kiesewetter and François-Joseph Fétis gave Josquin more prominence. The music historian August Wilhelm Ambros described Josquin in the 1860s as "one of the towering figures of Western music history, not merely a forerunner of Palestrina but his equal", and his research established the foundation for modern Josquin scholarship. In the early 20th century, leading musicologists such as Alfred Einstein and Carl Dahlhaus largely dismissed Josquin. Various publications then began to raise his status, beginning with a new edition of his complete works by Albert Smijers (1920s) and high evaluation by Friedrich Blume in the Das Chorwerk series. The early music revival raised Josquin's status, and brought the first major study on him by Helmuth Osthoff (Vol 1 1962/Vol 2 1965), an influential article by Lowinsky (1964), and debates between the musicologist Joseph Kerman and Lowinsky (1965). The 1971 International Josquin Festival-Conference firmly established Josquin in the center of Renaissance music, a position later cemented by Lowinsky's 1976 monograph. The New Josquin Edition began publication in 1987.

==== Skepticism and revision ====
External videos
- Ave Maria ... Virgo serena
- Performance by VOCES8
- Performance by Stile Antico

Reflecting on the sentiment that Josquin was "the greatest composer of his generation, and the most important, innovative, and influential composer of the late 15th and early 16th centuries", Richard Sherr notes growing dissent from that position in the early 21st century. Josquin's 2001 article in Grove Music Online lists fewer than 200 works attributed to him, down from more than 370. These revisions of Josquin's oeuvre have compromised some earlier scholarship which analyzed Josquin's style with works now not considered his. Major revision has also occurred in Josquin's biography, with entire portions of it being rewritten due to Josquin having been confused with people with similar names. (Note: Sherr cited numerous articles as milestones in revising Josquin's biography, including Fallows (1996), Kellman (1976), Lockwood (1976), Matthews & Merkley (1998), Roth (2000) and Starr (1997)) Controversy has arisen about the extent of Josquin's influence; there is no doubt about his importance in Western music, but some scholars have contended that the extent of his reevaluation has unrealistically apotheosized him over his contemporaries. Wegman asserts that Obrecht was more highly regarded in Josquin's time, to which Noble has noted that Josquin's prestigious positions, publications and employers "scarcely looks like the career of an unregarded composer". Reflecting on the dispute, Sherr has concluded that Josquin's reputation is somewhat lessened, but on the basis of his most admired and firmly attributed works "he remains one of the towering figures in the history of music".

Since the 1950s, Josquin's music has become central to the repertoire of many early music vocal ensembles and has been increasingly featured in recordings, with those by the Hilliard Ensemble, Orlando Consort, and A Sei Voci recommended by critics in the 1001 Classical Recordings You Must Hear Before You Die (2017) survey. (Note: See Urquhart (2000, Appendix B (Discography)), and Charles (1983, p. 127), for comprehensive discographies) The Tallis Scholars have recorded all of Josquin's masses, and won the Gramophone "record of the year" in 1987 for their recording of Missa Pange lingua, the only early music group to do so. Josquin's presence in 21st-century scholarship remains strong; he was the subject of David Fallows's major monograph (2009), which is currently the standard biography for the composer, and he and Machaut were the only pre-Baroque composers to have entire chapters in Taruskin's Oxford History of Western Music (2005). The 500th anniversary of Josquin's death in 2021 was widely commemorated.
