= Albert Smijers =

Dutch priest and musicologist (1888–1957)

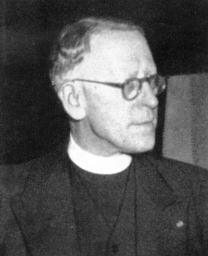
- Born: Albertus Antonius Smijers; 19 July 1888; Raamsdonksveer, Netherlands
- Died: 15 May 1957 (aged 68); Huis ter Heide, Netherlands
- Education: University of Vienna (PhD)
- Occupation: Musicologist

Albertus Antonius Smijers (19 July 1888 – 15 May 1957) was a Dutch musicologist who served as Professor of Musicology at the University of Utrecht. As one of the first Dutch musicologists to receive a doctorate, he chaired several organisations such as the International Musicological Society. Smijers was also a noted authority on Josquin des Pres; he published 44 volumes of Werken van Josquin des Prez from 1941 until his death, while another 11 volumes were published posthumously by his students.

== Early life ==
Albertus Antonius Smijers was born in Raamsdonksveer, Geertruidenberg, North Brabant to a primary school head teacher and his wife. The oldest son in a "very religious" Catholic family, he had three brothers and two sisters. He studied church music in Klosterneuburg in Lower Austria and was ordained as a Catholic priest on 1 June 1912. He later studied medieval music at the University of Music and Performing Arts Vienna and was supervised by Guido Adler at the University of Vienna, where he wrote a dissertation on Carolus Luython titled Karl Luython als Motettenkomponist (English: Karl Luython as a Composer of Motets). He graduated in 1917 and became one of the first Dutch musicologists to receive a doctorate.

== Career ==
In 1921, he published the first volume of Werken van Josquin des Prez, which was closely modelled on Ottaviano Petrucci's publications, and would eventually comprise 55 volumes. Until 1929, Smijers taught at a Catholic seminary in Amsterdam. In 1930, he was appointed Professor of Musicology at the University of Utrecht. He worked on the Werken until his death, producing 44 volumes on his own. It was completed in 1969 by two of his students—Myroslaw Antonowycz and Willem Elders. Among his other students were Jacques Chailley; Arend Koole; Eduard Reeser; and Marius Flothuis. Apart from Josquin, Smijers also wrote on Jacob Obrecht and Johannes Ockeghem, as well as the general history of music in the Netherlands.

Smijers held positions in numerous musical and musicological institutions. He was president of the Koninklijke Vereniging voor Nederlandse Muziekgeschiedenis (Royal Society for Music History of The Netherlands) from 1934 until his death, succeeding his mentor Anton Averkamp. From 1952 until 1955, Smijers served as president of the International Musicological Society, having been a member of its directorate since its inception in 1927. He was also president of both the Internationale Verein für katholische Kirchenmusik (International Association for Catholic Church Music) and the Nederlands Instituut voor Kerkmuziek (Dutch Institute for Church Music).

== Death ==
Having been ill since the start of the year, Smijer died on 15 May 1957, in Huis ter Heide, Netherlands. Hungarian-American musicologist Paul Henry Lang hailed Smijers as "that tower of international musical scholarship", whereas Dutch musicologist Petra van Langen claimed that "under the leadership of Albert Smijers, Dutch musicology achieved a prominent position in the world, especially in Renaissance music."
