= Missa Di dadi =

The Missa Di dadi, also known as the Dice Mass or Missa N'aray je jamais mieulx, is a musical setting of the Ordinary of the Mass by Franco-Flemish composer Josquin des Prez, probably dating from around 1480. It uses the chanson N'aray je jamais mieulx by Robert Morton as the source of its cantus firmus, and also contains unique visual and musical references to dice. The latter is thought to be a reference to the popularity of gambling in the court of the Sforza family at Milan, where Josquin wrote it.

== Style ==
The mass is based on the tenor of the chanson N'aray je jamais mieulx, by Robert Morton; the opening of this line is used in the early movements, while the Hosanna and Agnus Dei quote the entire tenor. The early movements, up to the Sanctus, also feature illustrations of pairs of dice, which indicate the speed-ratio between the tenor cantus firmus and the other parts. For example, in the Kyrie, the dice show a ratio of 2:1, and the note-lengths of the original chanson are doubled in order to fit with the other parts. In the Gloria it is 4:1, so the chanson is half as slow again, needing to be slowed down by a factor of four; in the Credo it is 6:1 and in the Sanctus 5:1.

It is speculated that these ratios, and the specific numbers involved, may represent an imaginary "game" of dice, which goes through several drawn rounds until the Sanctus's roll of 5+1=6 ends the game in a sudden victory (a metaphor for the "victory" of Christ over sin in Christian theology) - the sinful gamblers' dice thus disappearing between the end of the Sanctus and the beginning of the Benedictus, a gap during which, in liturgical practice of Josquin's time, the Host was elevated and the holiest portion of the Mass began.

Like most musical settings of the mass Ordinary, it is in five parts:

1. Kyrie
2. Gloria
3. Credo
4. Sanctus
5. Agnus Dei
