= Missa de Beata Virgine (Josquin) =

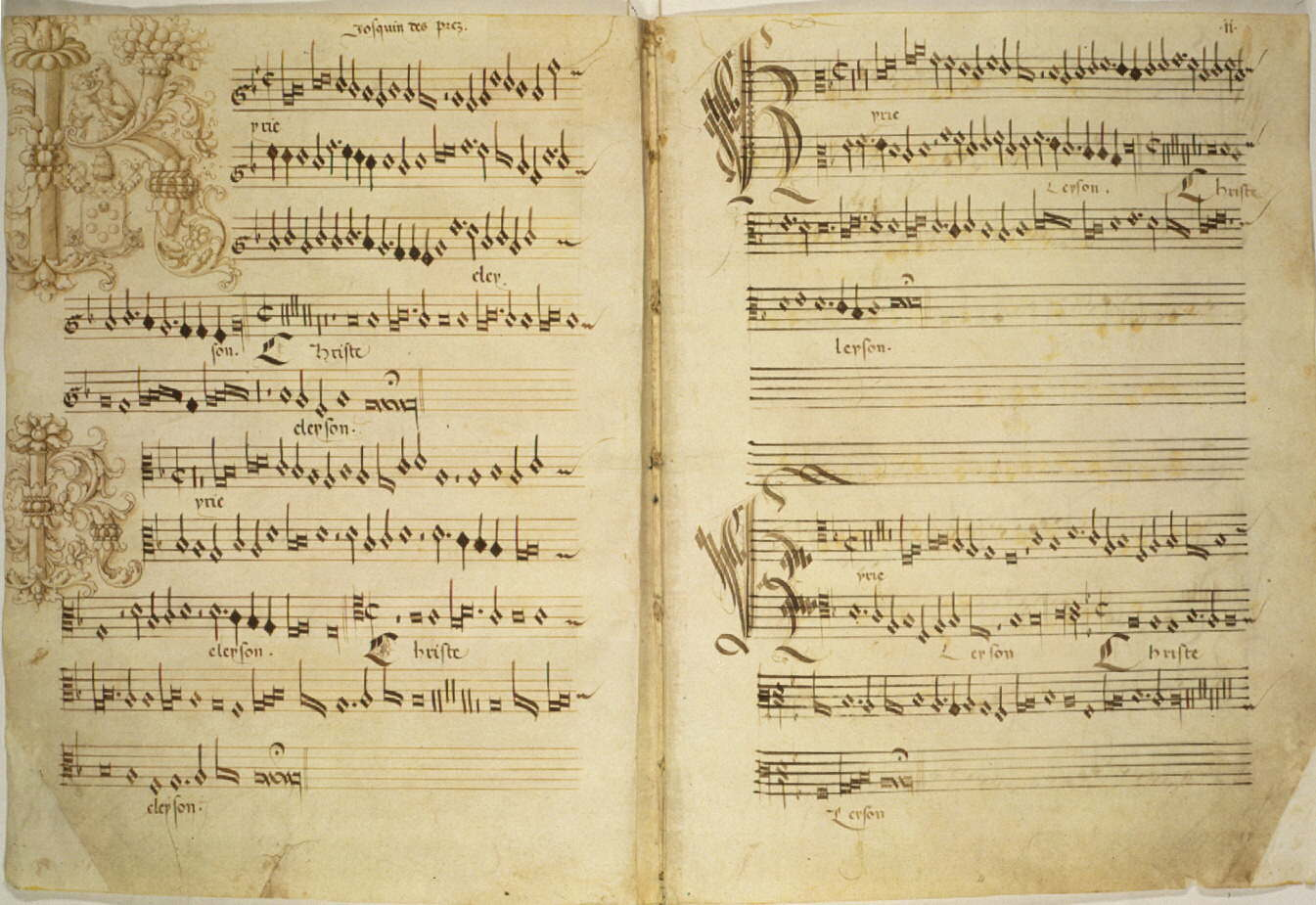
Manuscript copy from the papacy of Pope Leo X showing the opening Kyrie. (Vatican Library)

The Missa de Beata Virgine is a musical setting of the Ordinary of the Mass, by Renaissance composer Josquin des Prez. Though formerly believed to have been a late composition on the basis of stylistic analysis (Osthoff asserts 1513), evidence from Burchard’s Diary proves that the mass was written sometime before September 23, 1497. It was the most popular of his masses in the 16th century.

The Missa de Beata Virgine is unusual among Josquin's masses in that the first two movements are for four voices, and the last three for five, with the fifth voice derived canonically. Like most musical settings of the mass Ordinary, it is in five sections, or movements:

1. Kyrie
2. Gloria
3. Credo
4. Sanctus
5. Agnus Dei

It uses different plainsong chants for each movement, and is a paraphrase mass, one in which the original chants are elaborated, broken up, passed between voices, or sung in different voices simultaneously. The mass is one of only four that Josquin based on plainsong, and probably the second to last (the others are the Missa Gaudeamus, a relatively early work, the Missa Ave maris stella, and the Missa Pange lingua; all of them involve, in some way, glorification of the Virgin Mary). All of the chants in the Missa de Beata Virgine are in praise of the Virgin Mary, and the whole is a Lady Mass, the Votive Mass for Saturday, a type that was popular around 1500. Since music for two of the movements – the Gloria and Credo – appeared independently in Vatican sources, circulating in 1503 or before, it has been presumed that the mass was assembled later from several parts, and most likely the five-voice portions were composed around 1510. The first appearance of the whole mass was in Ottaviano Petrucci's 1514 book of Josquin's masses, his third such set; it has even been speculated that Petrucci himself may have put it together from an existing performance tradition. Most likely Josquin took the Gloria and Credo which he had already written, and then wrote a Kyrie to conform to the Gloria, and added a Sanctus and Agnus to go with the Credo, since the work's modal coherence suggests that he conceived at least the first two movements, and then the last three movements together.

The Missa de Beata Virgine was one of Josquin's last three masses, with the others being the Missa Sine nomine and the Missa Pange lingua. It was probably the earliest of the three, and Missa Pange lingua the last. Distinguishing the last masses, and his late style period in general, was a general simplification and refinement: Josquin left behind the elaborate contrapuntal artifice evident in the masses of the preceding period, such as the two he wrote on the L'homme armé tune, and wrote music in which bringing out the meaning of the text, and having it understood, was more important than any virtuoso display.

The movements differ in their treatment of the source plainchant. The Kyrie has the chant in all voices, imitatively and paraphrased; the Gloria treats the chant as a cantus firmus, migrating it from voice to voice. Tonally, both movements end on G, and most of their cadences are on G or D. The Credo, the first movement for five voices, ends with a surprising Phrygian cadence on E, and uses canonic techniques more prominently than in the preceding movements. The overall sound is darker and reminiscent of Johannes Ockeghem. The Sanctus is unusual among Josquin's mass movements, for the five voices sing throughout without a break: normally Josquin breaks up the texture with passages in reduced scoring. Yet the texture is light, with the voices singing polyphonically only some of the time. In the closing Agnus, the chant is treated freely, and the texture is similar to that which Josquin used in his chansons. Both the Agnus and Sanctus cadence on C.

The popularity of this mass in the 16th century may be due to its "sensuously appealing" surface texture, one which foreshadows the music of later composers such as Cristóbal Morales and Nicolas Gombert.
