= Abertijne Malcourt =

Franco-Flemish priest, tenor singer and music copyist

Abertijne Malcourt (Albertinus and Malcort are common alternate spellings) (d. before 1519) was a Franco-Flemish priest, tenor singer, and music copyist of the Renaissance, principally active at the end of the 15th century, contemporary with Johannes Ockeghem. He is considered to be the composer most likely to have written the famous chanson Malheur me bat, used as the basis for mass settings by Jacob Obrecht, Josquin des Prez, Alexander Agricola, and Andreas Sylvanus.

Some documentation has been found for Malcourt's life. He was a singer in 1475 and 1476 in Brussels at the cathedral of Ste. Gudule, and was there again as choirmaster between 1494 and 1498; it is not clear if he was there the whole time. He received a pension from Ste. Gudule in 1513, and is mentioned as being deceased in 1519. In addition to being a singer, he was a music copyist, having copied several books of music not only for Ste. Gudule but for the church of St. Niklaus, also in Brussels. The work for St. Niklaus occurred in 1486 to 1487. The only record of his having been a composer is the attribution to "Malcort" in a Ferrarese manuscript of the textless rondeau Malheur me bat; while this Malcort may have been Hendrick Malecourt, who was a singer in Bergen op Zoom around the same time, and worked directly with Obrecht, Abertijne Malcourt is currently considered to be the most likely candidate.
