= Robert Morton (composer) =

English composer (c1430–after Mar 1479)

Robert Morton (also Mourton, Moriton; c. 1430 – after 13 March 1479) was an English composer of the early Renaissance, mostly active at the Burgundian court. He was highly regarded at the time. Only secular vocal music, all rondeaux for three voices, survive.

== Life ==
Little can be reconstructed with certainty about his life except where his activity intersects with the Burgundian court. He was born in England, but no details of his early life are known. From 1457 until 1476 he was a clerc or chappellain in the chapel choir, and unusually he never was promoted to a higher position. By 1460 he was a priest, since he was given that title Messire in chapel documents.

The long relatively peaceful period at the court under Philip the Good's reign ended with Philip's death in 1467, and under his successor Charles the Bold, the musical activities of the court were seriously disrupted; many of the singers and composers, including Hayne van Ghizeghem, took part in his many futile military campaigns. Morton must have known Hayne rather well, for an anonymous piece survives which describes the virtuosic singing and playing of the two of them together at Cambrai.

Payment records for Morton end in 1476, and it was long assumed that he died then; however more recent evidence from the Vatican archive shows that he was alive as late as 1479, since he resigned a Dutch parish then.

There is a possibility, never established or fully investigated, that he may be the same Robert Morton who became Bishop of Worcester, and who died in 1497. Evidence for this connection includes the complete lack of documentation for the bishop between 1456 and 1476, when Morton was active in the Burgundian court, and the presence of Cardinal John Morton, uncle of the future bishop, in Burgundy at exactly the time when Robert disappears from the payment rolls.

== Music ==
Given the almost complete elimination of 15th century music manuscripts in England, largely by Henry VIII during the Dissolution of the Monasteries in the 1530s, it is not surprising that most of Morton's music survives in sources from the Continent, and if he was ever active as a musician in his native land, all trace is lost. Eight pieces survive, all rondeaux. One of the most famous of them is the earliest known setting of the tune l'homme armé, which was used by many early Renaissance composers as a cantus firmus for the Mass. This piece, a quodlibet, is probably datable to May 1464; it seems to have been written as a departure gift for another court composer, Simon le Breton.

Another of his rondeaux, Le souvenir de vous me tue, was exceedingly famous, and copies of this piece were widely disseminated in Europe.

All of Morton's surviving music is in French, not surprising since it all dates from his time in Burgundy. Melodically it is somewhat simpler than the music of his contemporaries such as Hayne or Antoine Busnois.

The music theorist and writer Johannes Tinctoris wrote glowingly of Morton, mentioning that he was "world-famous". Even though much of his music must have been lost—including any sacred music—he seems to have been influential on other composers at the court of Burgundy, and several of his compositions were used as source material for masses by later composers, including Josquin des Prez.

== Works ==
=== Attribution considered secure ===
1. Cousine trop vous abusés (rondeau, 3vv)
2. Il sera pour vous conbatu/L'homme armé (quodlibet; rondeau, 3vv; in another source a fourth voice is added)
3. Le souvenir de vous me tue (rondeau, 3vv)
4. Mon bien ma joyeux (rondeau, 3vv)
5. N'aray je jamais mieulx que j'ay (rondeau, 3vv)
6. Paracheve ton entreprise (rondeau, 3vv)
7. Plus j'ay le monde (rondeau, 3vv)
8. Que pourroit plus faire une dame (rondeau, 3vv)

=== Doubtful ===
1. C'est temps perdu
2. Elend du hast umbfangen mich (also known as Vive ma dame par amours)
3. Pues serviçio vos desplaze
4. Vien avante morte dolente
