= Missa sine nomine (Josquin) =

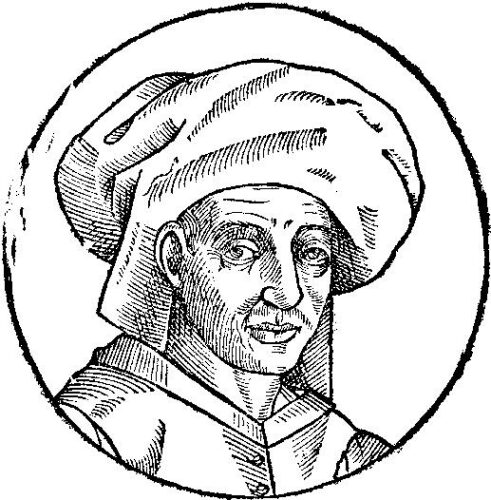
A 1611 woodcut of Josquin des Prez

The Missa Sine nomine is a setting of the Ordinary of the Mass by Renaissance composer Josquin des Prez. It is a work of his maturity, probably dating from the period after he returned to Condé-sur-l'Escaut in 1504. It is one of Josquin's only masses not to be based on pre-existing material, and like the Missa ad fugam, it is a canonic mass.

The circumstances of its composition are unknown. Since its first appearance was in Ottaviano Petrucci's third book of Josquin's masses (Fossombrone, 1514), and since it then also appeared in later manuscript copies, it is presumed that it was relatively recently composed at the time of publication; in addition stylistic characteristics suggest it was a late work. Josquin wrote only two canonic masses, the Missa ad fugam and the Missa sine nomine; they seem to stand at opposite ends of his career, and in the latter work he seemed to revisit some of the compositional problems he tackled in his early work in order to solve them a different way.

As in most musical settings of the mass Ordinary, it is in five parts:

1. Kyrie
2. Gloria
3. Credo
4. Sanctus
5. Agnus Dei

The melodic material on which the mass is based, "Sine nomine" (without a name), is either freely composed or from a source which has not been identified. All voices take part in the numerous canons, and the texture is often fully imitative. The movements generally become fuller in texture with faster note values as they progress, giving each a dramatic curve, and several end with ostinato patterns.

The work is likely a tribute to Johannes Ockeghem, who may have been Josquin's teacher or mentor, according to the testimony of several 16th century writers as well as internal evidence in many of Josquin's compositions. Not only is the mass indebted to Ockeghem through its use of elaborate canonic techniques, its modal ambiguity, and its avoidance of head-motifs to unify sections, but it directly quotes the lament Josquin wrote on Ockeghem's death – Nymphes des bois – in the et incarnatus section of the Credo, a part of the mass that Josquin often reserved for his most striking textural contrasts or effects.

The unconstrained compositional methods that Josquin employed in writing this mass foreshadowed what was probably his next work, the Missa Pange lingua, which was an extended fantasy on a plainsong, and which was probably his last mass.
