= Ave Maria ... virgo serena =

15th-century motet by Josquin des Prez

- Motet by Josquin des Prez
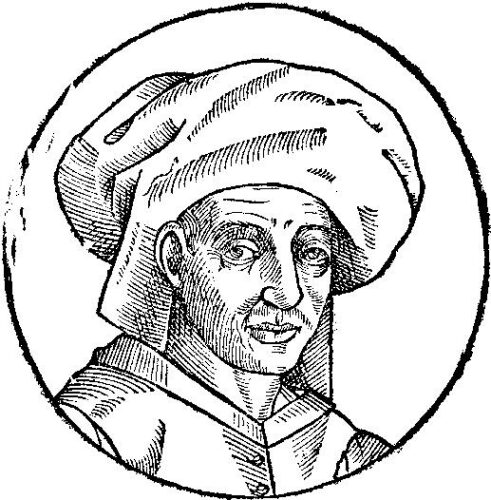
- A 1611 woodcut of Josquin des Prez
- English: 'Hail Mary ... gentil Virgin'
- Language: Latin
- Published: c. 1485
- Duration: Approx. 4:50

"Ave Maria ... virgo serena" is a motet composed by Josquin des Prez. It is regarded as Josquin's most famous motet and one of the most famous pieces of the 15th century. The piece rose to extreme popularity in the 16th century, even appearing at the head of the first volume of motets ever printed. Its revolutionary open style featuring early imitative counterpoint and two-voice parts has added to its acclaim as one of the most influential compositions of its time.

== Composition ==
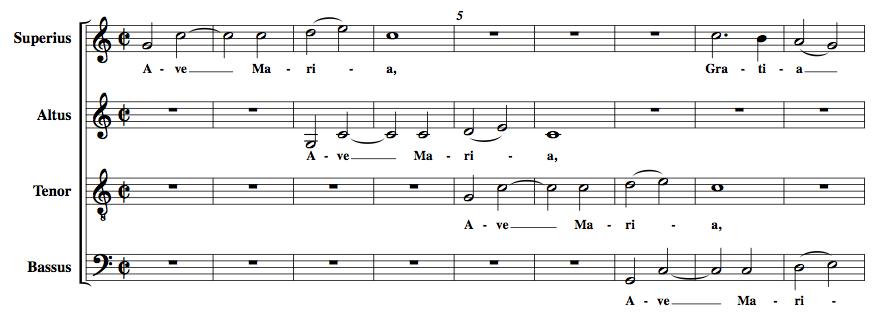
The opening line shows the lyrical use of imitative counterpoint.

The work was composed during Josquin des Prez's service at the North Italian court at Milan. It was initially thought to have been copied into the manuscript Munich 3154 by 1476. Subsequent work by Joshua Rifkin established the date of publication to about 1485. It is Josquin's earliest dateable work.

Several modern theorists have applied the concept of syntactic imitation to describe the lucid relationship between the text and Josquin's musical setting. Each phrase corresponds to a line of text, cleverly exposed through points of imitation. Structural articulations often resolve on cadences, where voices arrive on perfect intervals.

The opening section summarizes the first four lines of text in a simple structure. Clear imitation of each phrase, in the style of litany, dramatically echoes from the highest to lowest voice, almost resembling Gregorian chant. While the phrases are identical in length, the counterpoint's turbidity increases, climaxing where all four voices sing together. This climax turns to an imperfect, deceptive cadence.

The theme of syntactic imitation is exemplified by each strophe in the poem, comparable and balanced in length with the others. Local details in texture and counterpoint often directly relate to the syntactic effect of the text, like the sudden expanse of homophonic harmonies during "solemni plena gaudio". Following this moment comes "coelestia, terrestria...," while the vocalists join in climbing melodic lines and dense syncopation.

Sesquialtera transition at "Ave vera virginitas" in tenor and bass parts, clarifying the 3:2 proportion indicated by the overlapping placement of circle-3. (as printed in Petrucci's Motetti A, 1502)

While the regularity of imitation initially articulates the phrases, the middle verses exemplify the articulation from contrasts in texture. Duets alternate between voices and often break off into trios. The lines are punctuated by structural cadences, presenting the text in a temporary repose. Josquin locates each of these structural cadences in progressions of increasing power, placing the strongest, most perfect cadence for the very end of each line. The unity of musical sound, representing the spiritual unity of prayer, completes the act of worship which has been the rhetorical goal of the text. The final lines are sung in homophony, as if the four, once separate voices have aligned under the grace of God.

== Lyrics ==
Latin

Ave Maria, gratia plena,
Dominus tecum, virgo serena.

Ave cujus conceptio,
Solemni plena gaudio,
Coelestia, terrestria,
Nova replet laetitia.

Ave, cujus nativitas,
Nostra fuit solemnitas,
Ut lucifer lux oriens,
Verum solem praeveniens.

Ave, pia humilitas,
Sine viro fecunditas,
Cuius annunciatio,
Nostra fuit salvatio.

Ave, vera virginitas,
Immaculata castitas,
Cuius purificatio
Nostra fuit purgatio.

Ave praeclara omnibus,
Angelicis virtutibus,
Cujus fuit assumptio
Nostra glorificatio.

O Mater Dei,
memento mei.

Amen.

English

Hail Mary, full of grace,
The Lord is with you, gentil Virgin.

Hail, whose conception,
Full of solemn joy
The heaven, the earth,
Fills with new rejoicing.

Hail, thou whose birth
Was our festival
As our luminous rising light,
Coming before the true sun.

Hail, pious humility,
Fertility without a man,
Whose annunciation,
Was our salvation.

Hail, true virginity,
Unspotted chastity,
Whose purification
Was our cleansing.

Hail, famous with all,
Angelic virtues,
Whose assumption was
Our glorification.

O Mother of God,
Remember me.

Amen.
