= Johannes de Stokem =

Flemish composer

Johannes de Stokem (or Johannes Stokem, last name also Prato, Pratis, Stockem, Stokhem, Stoken, Stoccken, Stoecken, Sthoken; c. 1445 – 1487 or 1501), was a Flemish composer of the Renaissance. He is considered to be part of the post-Dufay generation in France. He was a friend of Johannes Tinctoris, another composer of the period.

== Life ==
Stokem was born in 1445, probably in Stokkem near Liège. For parts of his life, he served under Beatrice of Aragon, the Queen of Hungary, and as part of the Papal Choir in Rome. He died in either 1487 or 1501.

== Music and influence ==
His piece, Brunette, was published in the Odhecaton and is an early example of a genre of music commonly known as "little brown-eyed girl." It is one of the few five-voice works found in the Odhecaton.

== Works ==
1. Brunette, from the Odhecaton
2. Harraytre Amours, recently arraigned into a string trio.
3. Le suis d'Alemagne (4 voices)
4. Ave Maria Maris Stella (2 voices)
