= Missa L'homme armé sexti toni =

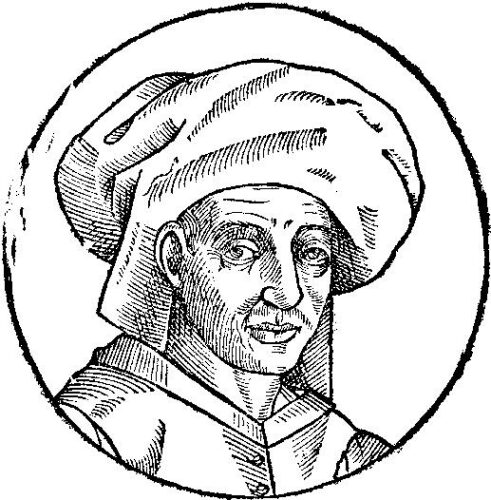
A 1611 woodcut of Josquin des Prez

Missa L'homme armé sexti toni is a L'homme armé mass by Josquin des Prez well into his career, composed some time in the late 15th century. It is thought to be the second of two L'homme armé masses Josquin composed and differs in many composition elements when compared to its earlier counterpart, Missa L'homme armé super voces musicales. This mass gets its name from Josquin's use of the sixth Gregorian mode, deviating from the norm. Missa L'homme armé sexti toni is also a paraphrase mass where the cantus firmus, or the L'homme armé melody in this case, jumps between voice parts rather than the usual practice of remaining primarily in the tenor part. This mass appears quite straightforward, adhering to the standard Mass ordinary text, but exhibits many complex uses of strict canon and repetition throughout its movements.

== Background ==
When assembling the whole of Missa L'homme armé sexti toni, musicologists used nine total sources, but none of these primary sources contained a perfect picture of the Mass. There are musical and notational differences across versions, which are typically speculated to be scribal error or due to the large dissemination of Josquin's music, and these discrepancies can be divided by geographical region: Northern and Italian. In general, the Italian sources include much more ornamentation than the more basic Northern sources and most modern editions use a mix of both to create a cohesive final piece. The Tallis Scholars, an early music group, have performed and recorded Missa L'homme armé sexti toni and made some changes in performance, including transposition, changes to tempo and mensuration, and using musica ficta.

== The L'homme armé melody ==
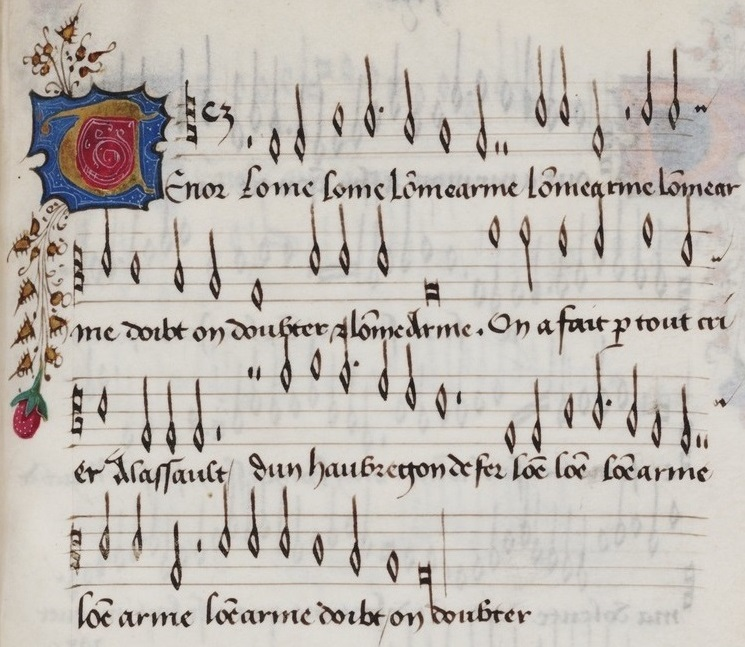
The L'homme armé melody (1470)

L'homme armé or "The armed man" is a song originating from the early 15th century, and while the text is not used in Missa L'homme armé sexti toni, the song is about the fear that comes during times of war. This secular tune contains eight distinct phrases and easily conforms to the imitative and canonic writing styles of Renaissance masses, frequently undergoing compositional transformations to serve as a cantus firmus. The harmonic fabric of Renaissance composition relies heavily upon writing around the cantus firmus, so the original L'homme armé melody may be elongated, shortened, reversed, transposed, or cut up and spread across vocal lines.

== Movements ==
=== Kyrie ===
This mass opens with "Kyrie eleison" which translates to "Lord, have mercy". Josquin utilizes classic Renaissance compositional practices of canon and imitation to set the stage for his unorthodox parody mass and this imitative writing pervades much of this opening section.

=== Gloria ===
As is common practice, the Gloria begins with an incipit. This movement utilizes duets between the altus and the other voices to fill much of the first portion of the Gloria as the tenor voice sustains an extended version of the L'homme armé melody underneath this texture, in the manner of a standard cantus firmus.

=== Credo ===
The Credo also begins with an incipit. Josquin makes effective use of the B section of the L'homme armé melody in this movement, having it appear in the bassus and tenor voices and mirroring the tune's concluding line in the larger movement's conclusion.

=== Sanctus ===
The Sanctus contains seven sections, which is more than the other Mass Ordinary movements. A majority of this movement is made up of duets that are closely related to one another, such as the Pleni and Gloria tua, where Josquin reuses the harmonic material but transposes it to be performed by a different pair of singers. This movement also contains the Osanna and the Benedictus, which exist as moments of climax for many musical settings of the Mass Ordinary. The movement finishes with an encore of the Osanna as indicated by "Osanna ut supra" written at the end.

=== Agnus Dei ===
The first Agnus Dei is a standard four voice texture, but in the second Agnus Dei, Josquin removes the tenor voice, creating a slightly emptier sound that is full of canons and repetition. In the final Agnus Dei (referred to as Agnus Dei III in scholarly material), Josquin utilizes six voices, adding another superius and altus voice. Josquin uses imitation at the quarter note between both the altus voices and both superius voices, creating a very fugue-like, cascading texture. Additionally, Josquin implements a crab canon where the tenor sings the cantus firmus at the same time as the bassus sings the cantus firmus in reverse, causing both voices to line up in the middle only for a moment before splitting once more.
