= Missa L'homme armé super voces musicales =

Mass by Josquin des Prez

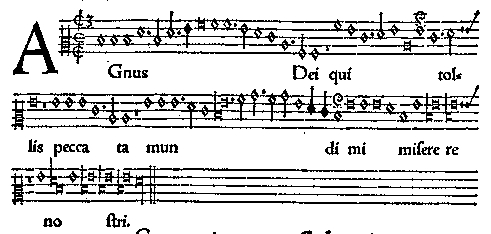
Agnus Dei II, from Josquin's Missa L'homme armé super voces musicales, as reprinted in the Dodecachordon of Heinrich Glarean. A realization in modern notation is given below.

The Missa L'homme armé super voces musicales is the first of two settings of the Ordinary of the Mass by Josquin des Prez using the famous L'homme armé tune as his cantus firmus source material (for the other, presumed later, setting see Missa L'homme armé sexti toni). The setting is for four voices. It was the most famous mass Josquin composed, surviving in numerous manuscripts and print editions. The earliest printed collection of music devoted to a single composer, the Misse Josquin published by Ottaviano Petrucci in 1502, begins with this famous work.

== Background ==
Dating of the mass has been controversial, with some scholars proposing a mid-career date, for example during Josquin's Roman period (roughly 1489 to 1495), and other scholars, such as Gustave Reese, arguing for an earlier date, claiming that the contrapuntal complexity the mass shows is more typical of Josquin's early style, and that he simplified his method as he aged. The earliest source containing the mass is the Vatican manuscript CS 197 (c. 1492–1495) In his 1547 Dodekachordon, Heinrich Glarean wrote that Josquin "composed the two L'homme armé masses to show off his skill."

== Music ==
While usually classified as a cantus firmus mass, the use of snatches of the tune in other voices foreshadows the paraphrase technique which Josquin was to use extensively later in works such as the Missa Pange lingua, and which was to become one of the standard methods of writing cyclic masses in the 16th century.

Like most settings of the mass, it is in five sections:

1. Kyrie
2. Gloria
3. Credo
4. Sanctus and Benedictus
5. Agnus Dei (in three sections: I, II, III)

Agnus Dei (II) from Missa l'homme armé super voces musicales. The entire Agnus Dei II consists of a three-part mensuration canon. The middle voice is the slowest; the lowest voice sings at twice the speed of the middle voice, and the top voice at three times the speed.

Showing off his contrapuntal virtuosity seems to be Josquin's aim, and the mass is full of mensuration canons, second only to Ockeghem's Missa prolationum, which contains nothing but mensuration canons. In a mensuration canon, each voice sings the same notes, but the length of time each note is sung differs. The opening Kyrie of Josquin's mass contains consecutive mensuration canons based on each phrase of the L'homme armé tune, with the tenor leading each and the other voices entering in turn. The second of the three of Agnus Dei sections is another well-known mensuration canon (see example); this particular canon was famous in the sixteenth century, and often mentioned in theoretical treatises.

The last of the three repetitions of the Agnus Dei, the section that closes the mass, is the longest, and is accompanied by a direction in the score: "Clama ne cesses" ("cry without ceasing", from Isaiah 58:1), which in this context means to sing the tune without any of the rests. The cantus firmus is pitched on A, the highest note of the hexachord, and is in double augmentation. The length, and the sustained notes of the cantus firmus, refer both to the "cry for mercy" aspect of the Agnus Dei text, which cries to the Lamb of God to take away the sins of the world, and to the trumpet motif and text "On a fait partout crier" from the original L'homme armé tune, calling the listeners to arms.

In addition to the canonic complexities, Josquin adds variety by beginning the L'homme armé tune on a successively higher note in each section (and also in the third Agnus Dei), one for each of the six notes in the natural hexachord (thus the title, "voces musicales", or solmization syllables, ut, re, mi, fa, sol, la). The overall modality is Dorian, and all of the movements end on D.
