= Nymphes des bois =

1498 composition by Josquin des Prez

Nymphes des bois, also known as La Déploration de Johannes Ockeghem or Déploration sur la mort de Johannes Ockeghem, is a lament composed by Josquin des Prez on the occasion of the death of his predecessor Johannes Ockeghem in February 1497. The composition is based on a poem written by Jean Molinet (1435–1507). The performance date most likely coincides with the first anniversary of Ockeghem's death, 4 February 1498.

Nymphes des bois is frequently considered one of the most moving works of the Renaissance repertoire, and widely interpreted as a funeral tribute to Johannes Ockeghem. Alternative readings of the work have been proposed, based on possible enigmatic or ambiguous elements in the work, suggesting the presence of intellectual games or even subtle irony. These interpretations remain speculative and do not represent the predominant consensus in musicology, which understands the piece primarily as a respectful déploration.

== Modern editions ==
The New Josquin Edition 29.18, 2016, ed. Patrick Macey. P. 277 of its Critical Commentary lists all other extant editions.

== Sources ==
- Ottaviano Petrucci's textless print from 1508, entitled Requiem. Its quinta pars is missing.
- The Medici Codex from 1518. Text: Molinet's poem with an extra line added between line 7 and 8.
- Tielman Susato's print from 1545, with a substantial change in the text of the first stanza of Molinet's poem.
- The Medici Codex and Susato's print are in black notation, symbolising mourning. Mensuration signs and clefs are absent except in Petrucci's edition. All voices have staff signatures of a flat (mi/fa signs). In the Medici Codex the following canon (performance direction) was added to the Tenor: Pour eviter noyse et debas, Prenez ung demy ton plus bas (To avoid debate and quarrelling, half a tone down this line you should sing). Susato's version is more prosaic: Ung demi ton plus bas (One semitone lower). Only in Petrucci's print clefs and mensuration signs are indicated. The breve forms the tactus, the mensuration sign is imperfect (¢), and the Phrygian mode is transposed up a fourth to a.

== Molinet's poem ==
Below, the text of Epitaphe de venerable seigneur de bonne memoire Okgam tresorier de tours Composé par maistre Jehan moulinet (Epitaph of the venerable lord of good memory, Okgam, treasurer of [the abbey of] Tours, composed by master Jehan Moulinet) is provided in the original Middle French and English.

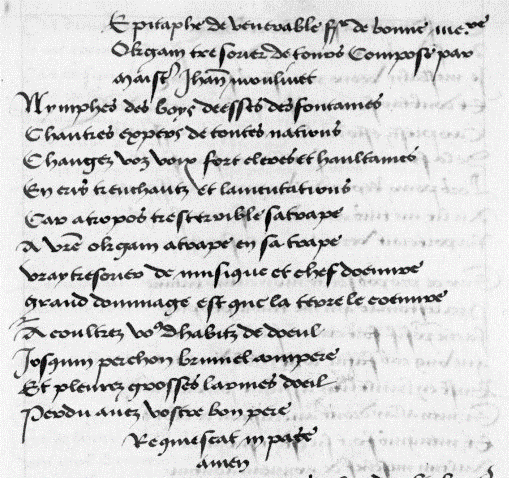
Poem by Jehan Moulinet

Nymphes des boys deesses des fontaines,
Chantres expers de toutes nations,
Changéz voz voix fort cleres et haultaines
En cris trenchantz et lamentations.
Car atropos, tres terrible satrappe,
A vostre okgam atrape en sa trape.
Vray tresorier de musique et chef doeuvre.
Grant dommage est que la terre le coeuvre.

Acoultrez vous dhabitz de doeul,
Josquin, perchon, brumel, compere,
Et pleurez grosses larmes doeuil,
Perdu avez vostre bon pere

Requiescat in pace.
Amen.

Nymphs of the woods, goddesses of the fountains,
Expert singers of all nations,
Change your voices, so clear and high
Into strident cries and lamentations.
For Atropos, that terrible Satrap,
Has trapped your Ockeghem in her trap.
True treasurer of music and eminent craftsman.
A great pity it is that the earth covers him.

Put on your mourning cloaks,
Josquin, Piersson, Brumel, Compère,
And shed big tears from your eyes,
You have lost your good father.

May he rest in peace.
Amen.

== Musical setting ==
The musical setting contains an extra line of text which does not belong to the poem. It is inserted between lines 7 and 8: Doct elegant de corps et non point trappe (Learned, of elegant physique and not at all stocky).

General characteristics of Nymphes

The setting is five-part: Superius, Altus, Tenor, Quinta-pars and Bassus. Symbolically each voice represents one of the five composers as mentioned in Molinet's poem: Ockeghem in the Tenor, Josquin, Pierre de la Rue, Brumel and Compère in the surrounding voices. The composition follows the structure of Molinet's poem, which contains three sections. Symbolically these sections also follow the three stages of the funeral rites associated with the Office of the Dead (the officium defunctorum). This ceremony started the evening before the burial and was continued until the burial the next day.

Section I:

Section I corresponds with the vespers, in which the first part of the Requiem chant (Requiem aeternam dona eis Domine, et lux perpetua luceat eis: (O Lord, grant to them eternal rest and let eternal light shine upon them) is being sung and the death knell rung. This chant is used in the Tenor as a cantus firmus. According to the canon, the chant should be taken down half a tone, transposing the Lydian mode to the Phrygian mode, a mode the affect of which expresses discontent and sadness. The Tenor quotes the Superius of Ockeghem's three-part Requiem-Mass. There are two more quotations: the Superius paraphrases the opening of Ockeghem’s four-part Missa Cuiusvis toni. the Altus quotes Ockeghem's Missa Mi-mi, which in turn is based on the Tenor of his three-part chanson Presque transi. The original setting of both masses is in the Phrygian mode. After three breves the Quinta pars follows the Altus. The Bass follows the melody of theTenor, but rhythmically follows the outer voices. The Quinta pars and the Bassus are transposed a fifth down, thus remaining in the Phrygian mode.

Section II:

Section II corresponds with the vigils, the nightly service where lit candles and mourners surround the deceased, prayers are being said and psalms and antiphons sung. It is in four-part homophony. The Tenor is absent. The Superius quotes the incipit of the second part of Ockeghem's chanson Ut heremita solus (alone like a hermit).

Section III:

Section III follows the laudes, the early morning-service in which prayers are said, antiphons and psalms are sung. It ends with the dismissio, the liturgical formula (Requiescant in pace, amen), where the congregation prays for the deceased and all those who went before, after which the burial takes place. Five-part homophony is restored but the Tenor no longer functions as cantus firmus.

Josquin applied all mensural signs of Okeghem's quoted works in his score.

== Alternative interpretations ==
In 2024, an article by Marianne Hund, "Josquin's Nymphes des bois, uncovering the hidden layers" was published in the Tijdschrift van de Koninklijke Vereniging voor Nederlandse Muziekgeschiedenis. The below section presents Hund's alternative hypotheses regarding the work.

It was common practice and a source of amusement for fourteenth and fifteenth-century musicians to solve the riddles and enigmatic remarks which composers often inserted in their music in order to test their intellectual and musical capacities. Medieval thought is multilayered and, being a child of his time, Josquin too made use of this idiom. The canon which accompanies the Tenor of Nymphes forms an example. It also might suggest that the parts initially handed out to Josquin's singers, were not equipped with indications about pitch, mensuration or accidentals whatsoever. Part of the fun would have been to test the singers' capacity to discover these hidden layers by themselves. For a well-trained singer familiar with Ockeghem's repertoire, a solid knowledge of musical theory and the canon accompanying the Tenor would have been sufficient to solve all technical problems. In the course of the sixteenth century musicians gradually lost the understanding of the hidden layers in music and poetry of the Middle Ages. This might explain Susato's considerable alterations of the text, which as it were 'neutralise' the enigmatic extra line of the poetry. For that reason Susato's textual adaptations don't have much to do with Josquin's initial concept and therefore were dismissed by Hund.

The hidden layers mainly occur in Section I and are always connected with certain anomalies in music and text.

Section I

The first anomaly. How a 'cold' can lead towards the dating of Nymphes

Changez vos vois tant clères et haultaines en cris trenchans et lamentations

In bars 14–15, the last syllable of the word lamentations ends on a melisma in the Altus, the Quinta pars and the Bassus. In French vocal repertoire, melismas on words ending with an, en, in, on, and un are avoided since they entirely block the nasal cavities and make the singer sound ridiculous, as if he has a terrible cold. But in the present case, the word lamentations would authorise a stuffed-up nose. The fact that Josquin more or less obliged his performers to sing this impossible melisma must have caused quite some hilarity, for early 1501 a parody on Nymphes saw the light which especially refers to the 'cold'. This parody enables one to date the lament between February 1498 (the first anniversary of Ockeghem's death), and the end of 1500. Josquin himself may have been its author. February 1498 seems to be the most likely, since obits usually were held at the first anniversary of someone's death.

The second anomaly. How a fate-goddess managed to cut away Ockeghem's golden voice

Car Atropos, très terrible Satrappe a vostre Ockeghem attrape en sa trappe

Between bars 17 and 23 the Tenor (Ockeghem) is cut away twice: five breves in bars 17–18, and eight breves in bars 21–23. In bars 20–21 the remaining voices – the four composers – call Ockeghem's name in vain, for physically he has ceased to exist. However, his music remains and will be a light (lux) forever shining upon them (perpetua luceat eis). This explains the fact that in bars 19–20 the Tenor briefly returns at the words Et Lux to reaffirm that Ockeghem symbolically still is a shining beacon for those left behind. This is confirmed by the way Josquin uses the wording of the refrain of Molinet's Latin epitaph on Ockeghem: ut sit clarificatus sol lucens super omnes (so that "he may be the glorified sun shining upon all"). In bars 19–20, below et lux in the T, the Quinta pars enters with the motif g–d1, the solmisation syllables of which are ut–sol in hexachordum durum.

The third anomaly. How an extra line of poetry caused Ockeghem's 'downfall'

(Vray tresorier de musique et chief d'oeuvre) Doct elegant de corps et non point trappe

In bar 27 the line of poetry which does not occur in Molinet's original is introduced. It is inserted between lines 7 and 8, and not only deviates from the rhyme scheme of Molinet's poem, but is also contrary to the conventions of the formes fixes in the poetry of the time. Since Ockeghem was well known for his tall and handsome physique, non point trappe (not at all stocky) already sounds rather strange and slightly sarcastic. Josquin literally uses the false bottom of the word trappe. In fifteenth-century (and modern) French, trappe also means 'trap door'. This is painted musically in a truly outrageous way. In bars 29–30 on the word trappe, a conjunct descending line starts from S (f^{1}–d) to A (b^{♭}–g). Then in bar 30, within the span of one breve, a 'cascade' follows from d^{1} Altus ('la' in the soft hexachord), to a Tenor ('la' in the natural hexachord), f♯ Quinta pars (ficta, no hexachord function) and, skipping the 'la' of the hard hexachord, abruptly lands on its fundamental Gamma-ut in the Bass, on the word grant. In hexachord terms: in three moves Ockeghem tumbles down through the three lowest hexachords to land at the bottom of the system. Lower than this a musician of the period could not fall. It is like the sudden opening of a trap door, a late medieval device to get rid of a persona non grata by sending him to the dungeons of the castle into oblivion. This association is still extant in modern French.

Had there been a conflict between the two composers?

A possible conflict between the two composers could point back to Josquin's employment in Paris, between 1480 and 1482. There had been substantial trouble between the regular choir under the direction of Ockegem and the eight elite-singers – among which Josquin – freshly arrived from the court of René d'Anjou in Aix en Provence, who had died recently. The new singers had a privileged position and were directly and lavishly paid by the king. This of course caused jealousy and complaints from the regulars and eventually threatened the cohesion of Ockeghem's choir. At the end of December 1482 or the beginning of January 1483 Ockeghem might have decided to put an end to these quarrels by sending away the new singers, without any consideration for their talents. A heavy blow for Josquin, who was young and ambitious, and admired him greatly. He must have been furious. Early February 1483 he is back home in Condé.

Was there still a chance of making things up?

Grant dommaige est que la terre le coeuvre

Of course there was, for it would have been rather unchristian and indelicate to send a colleague to his grave like that without somehow making things up first.

Grant.

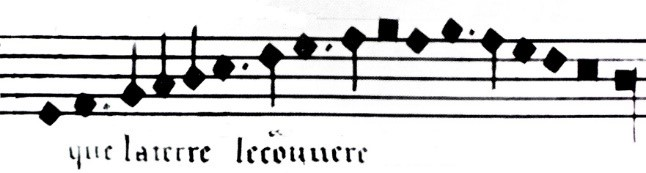
Quinta pars, bar 33 onwards

Unanimously the composers cry out: what a great pity it is that the earth is covering him. And now look at the Quinta pars. From bar 33 onwards this voice runs up from low c to high e and then returns to g in bar 36, as if following the text to the letter and musically heaping a pile of earth onto Ockeghem's grave.

And here comes the last hidden layer: This pile of earth can be interpreted as the Dutch/Flemish expression: zand erover (literally: sand over it), meaning: "let's stop talking about it, let bygones be bygones, let's forgive and forget".

Section II and III

The next two sections represent what is befitting for a funeral song: no more false bottoms, no more crocodile tears, no more puns, but sincere regret about the loss of one of the greatest composers of the late 15th century.

Section II

Accoultrez-vous d'habitz de doeul, Josquin, Piersson, Brumel, Compère.

During the vigils the four composers, exhorted to mourn their 'good father', kneel around the bier, lit by candles at the four corners, with their heads covered by the hoods of their mourning cloaks and their notes falling down like teardrops. The Tenor is absent, symbolising that Ockeghem is only present in the mind. The Altus refers to the incipit of the cantus firmus an octave up, returning to the Phrygian mode, and in this way functions as an Ersatz of the T.

Section III

Requiescat in pace, Amen.

During the laudes the five-part setting is taken up again, but the Tenor no longer has a leading function. The Altus, serving once again as a kind of 'Ersatz' Tenor, modulates the incipit of the Requiem chant from the Phrygian mode to the Hypophrygian mode, which symbolises acceptance and resignation. Hence, in this last section, and contrary to what happened in bars 29–30, Ockeghem is gently and respectfully rocked into his grave, accompanied by the descending repeats of the word 'Amen'. Josquin also uses gematria in order to evoke the name Ockeghem, which counts sixty-four notes, the same amount as the total number of notes of this section.

=== Afterword ===
Hund argues that in Section I the 'special effects' in the lower voices were not supposed to be heard by the general public, for that would have meant professional suicide for Josquin. He constructed Nymphes in such a way that the Superius masks the anomalies, only to be noticed by his 'expert singers'. And it is always the Quinta pars leading the dance:

- At the melisma in bars 14–15 the Quinta pars takes the lead with the motif a–c–b♭–a, functioning as a 'plaintive' cadence in the Phrygian mode, symbolising Josquin's 'crocodile tears'.
- At the beginning of bar 19: g–d (in hexachord terms ut–sol), referring to the refrain of Molinet's Latin poem on Ockeghem: Ut sol lucens super omnes. (like a sun shining upon all), indicating Josquin's professional admiration for Ockeghem.
- In bars 29/30: the unusual (but theoretically correct) way to solve the tritone with f♯–b instead of f–b♭, triggering off Ockeghem's 'downfall', thus expressing Josquin's resentment about Ockeghem as a person.
- In bars 33–37: The heaping of the earth onto Ockeghem's grave. Making things up again.

Although speculative, it is likely that Josquin reserved the Quinta pars for himself. This would turn Nymphes des bois into a very personal statement indeed.
