= Names of Germany =

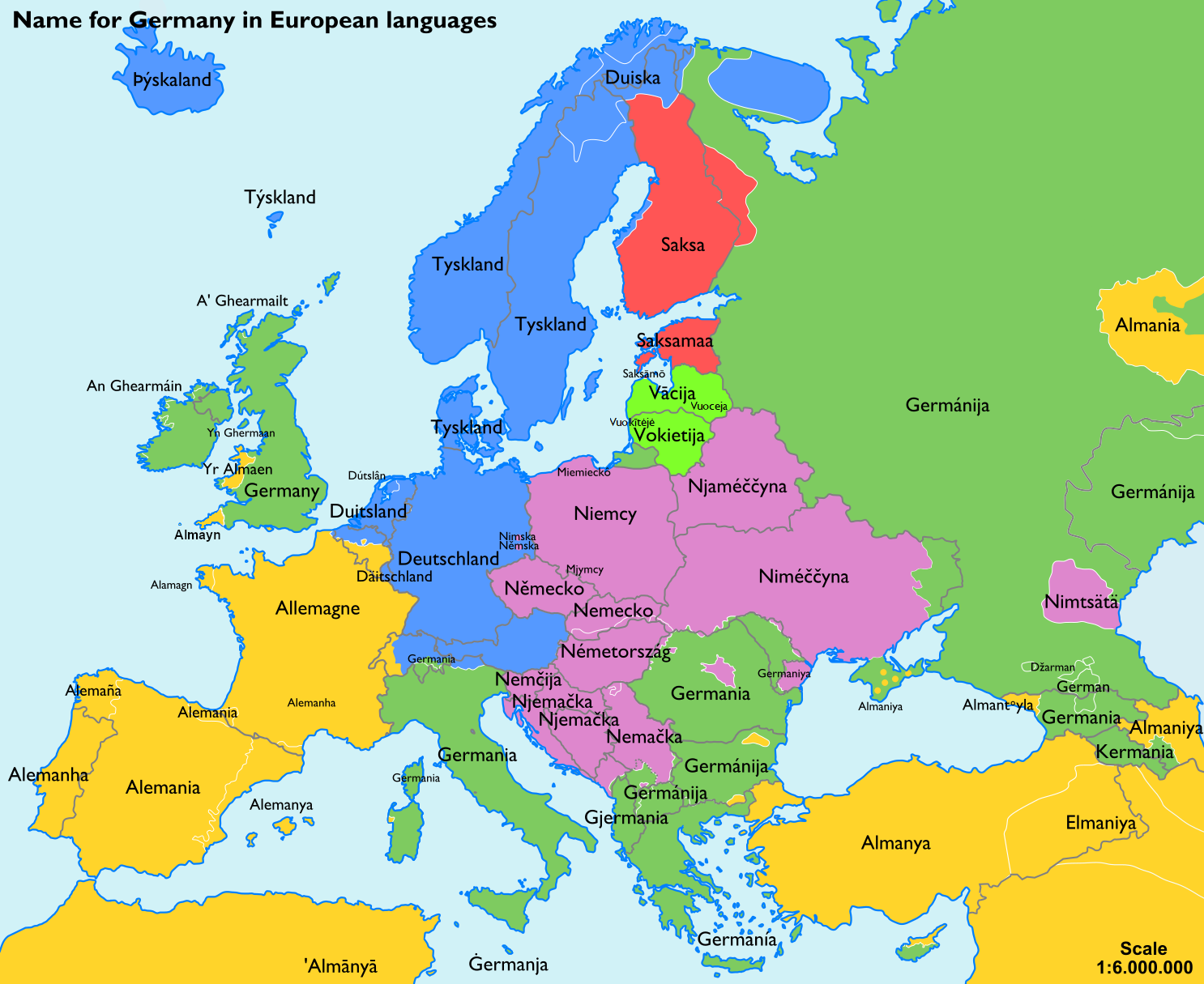
European languages – name derived from: Proto-Germanic *Þeudiskaz Latin Germania the name of the Alamanni tribe the name of the Saxon tribe Proto-Slavic *němьcь Probably Proto-Balto-Slavic *vākyā-

There are numerous widely varying names of Germany in different languages, more so than for an other European nation. For example:

- the German language endonym is Deutschland, from the Old High German diutisc, meaning "of the people";
- the French exonym is Allemagne, from the name of the Alamanni tribe;
- in Italian it is Germania, from the Latin Germania, although the German people are called tedeschi, which is cognate with German Deutsch;
- in Polish it is Niemcy, from the Proto-Slavic *němьcь, meaning speechless, since German is not mutually intelligible with Slavic languages;
- in Finnish it is Saksa, from the name of the Saxon tribe;
- in Lithuanian it is Vokietija, of unclear origin, but possibly from Proto-Balto-Slavic *vākyā-, meaning “those who speak loud, shout (unintelligibly)”.

Often language lags behind the changing society and names tend to retain references to first encounters: the Finnish first and foremost met the Saxons while the French faced the Alamanni. Comparable tendencies appear elsewhere, e.g. in names for Russia.

Each of the names for Germany has been adapted into other languages all over the world. After an overview of variants this article presents etymological and geographic context for the forms and their worldwide usage as well as names used in bureaucracy.

== List of area names ==
In general, the names for Germany can be arranged in six main groups according to their origin:

=== From Old High German diutisc or similar ===
(Note: Diutisc or similar, from Proto-Germanic *Þeudiskaz, meaning "of the people", "of the folk")

- Afrikaans: Duitsland
- Chinese: 德意志 (pinyin: Déyìzhì), commonly 德國 (trad.) or 德国 (simp.) (Déguó; "Dé" from 德意志, and "guó" means "country")
- Danish: Tyskland
- Dutch: Duitsland
- Faroese: Týskland
- German: Deutschland
- Icelandic: Þýskaland
- Japanese: ドイツ (独逸) (Doitsu)
- Kinyarwanda: Ubudage
- Korean: 독일(獨逸) (Dogil; Korean pronunciation of Japanese name in Kanji) or 도이췰란드 (Doichwillandeu – North Korea)
- Kven: Tyskä
- Lojban: dotygu'e
- Low German/Low Saxon: Düütschland/Duutslaand
- Luxembourgish: Däitschland
- Medieval Latin: Teutonia, regnum Teutonicum
- Nahuatl: Teutōtitlan
- Norwegian: Tyskland
- Northern Sami: Duiska
- Northern Sotho: Tôitšhi
- Swedish: Tyskland
- Tamil: இடாய்ச்சுலாந்து (idaichulandu)
- Vietnamese: Đức (德; Vietnamese pronunciation of Chinese abbreviation)
- West Frisian: Dútslân
- Yiddish: דײַטשלאַנד (daytshland)

=== From the Latin Germania ===
- Acehnese: Jeureuman
- Albanian: Gjermania
- Aramaic: ܓܪܡܢ (jerman)
- Armenian: Գերմանիա (Germania)
- Bengali: জার্মানি (jarmani)
- Bulgarian: Германия (Germánija) (Note: While the Bulgarian name of the country belongs to the second category, the demonym is "немски" (nemski), belonging to the fifth category)
- Burmese: ဂျာမနီ (gyamani)
- Modern English: Germany
- Esperanto: Germanio (also Germanujo)
- Friulian: Gjermanie
- Georgian: გერმანია (germania)
- Greek: Γερμανία (Germanía)
- Gujarati: જર્મની (jarmanī)
- Hausa: Jamus
- Modern Hebrew: גרמניה (germánya)
- Hindi: जर्मनी (jarmanī)
- Ido: Germania
- Pashto: جارمنی/jarmani
- Indonesian: Jerman
- Interlingua: Germania
- Irish: An Ghearmáin
- Italian: Germania (Note: While the Italian name of the country belongs to the second category, the demonym is tedesco, belonging to the first category)
- Hawaiian: Kelemania
- Kannada: ಜರ್ಮನಿ (jarmani)
- Kyrgyz: Германия (germaniya, via Russian) (Note: While the Kyrgyz name of the country belongs to the second category, the demonym is "немис" (""nemis"") and the name of the language is "немисче" (nemische), both belonging to the fifth category)
- Lao: ເຢຍລະມັນ (yīa la man)
- Latin: Germania
- Macedonian: Германија (Germanija)
- Malay (incl. Malaysian and Indonesian): Jerman
- Malayalam: ജർമനി (jarmani)
- Manx: Yn Ghermaan
- Maltese: Ġermanja
- Māori: Tiamana
- Marathi: जर्मनी (jarmanī)
- Marshallese: Jāmne
- Mongolian: Герман (German)
- Nauruan: Djermani
- Nepali: जर्मनी (jarmanī)
- Odia: ଜର୍ମନୀ/ଜର୍ମାନୀ (jårmånī/jårmānī)
- Punjabi: ਜਰਮਨੀ/جرمنی (jarmanī)
- Romanian: Germania (Note: The common demonym in Romanian is german, but the popular term neamț can be heard too)
- Rumantsch: Germania
- Russian: Германия (Germánija) (Note: While the Russian name of the country belongs to the second category, the demonym is "немецкий" (nemetskiy), belonging to the fifth category)
- Samoan: Siamani
- Sardinian: Germania (Note: While the Sardinian name of the country belongs to the second category, the demonym is "tedescu", belonging to the first category)
- Scottish Gaelic: A' Ghearmailt
- Sicilian: Girmania
- Sinhala: ජර්මනිය (jarmaniya)
- Somali: Jarmal
- Sundanese: Jérman
- Swahili: Ujerumani
- Tahitian: Heremani
- Tamil: செருமனி (cerumani), ஜெர்மனி (jermani)
- Thai: เยอรมนี (yəə-rá-má-nii), เยอรมัน (yəə-rá-man) (adjective)
- Tongan: Siamane
- Urdu: جرمنی (jarmanī)
- Uyghur: گېرمانىيە (gërmaniye)

=== From the name of the Alamanni tribe ===
- Arabic: ألمانيا (ʾalmānyā)
- Asturian: Alemaña
- Azerbaijani: Almaniya
- Basque: Alemania
- Breton: Alamagn
- Catalan: Alemanya
- Central Bikol: Alemanya
- Cornish: Almayn
- Extremaduran: Alemaña
- Filipino: Alemanya
- Franco-Provençal: Alemagnes
- French: Allemagne
- Galician: Alemaña
- Guarani: Alemáña
- Hindi: आल्मानिया (ālmāniyā)
- Kazakh: Алмания (Almanïya), not used anymore or used very rarely, now using Russian "Германия".
- Khmer: អាល្លឺម៉ង់ (ʾaalləɨmɑng)
- Kurdish: Elmaniya
- Ladino: Almania
- Latin: Alemannia
- Mirandese: Almanha
- Occitan: Alemanha
- Ojibwe ᐋᓂᒫ (aanimaa)
- Persian: آلمان (ālmān)
- Piedmontese: Almagna
- Portuguese: Alemanha
- Quechua: Alimanya
- Spanish: Alemania
- Tajik: Олмон (Olmon)
- Tatar: Алмания Almania
- Tetum: Alemaña
- Turkish: Almanya
- Urdu: آلمانیہ (ālmāniya)
- Welsh: Yr Almaen (with preceding definite article)

=== From the name of the Saxon tribe ===
- Estonian: Saksamaa
- Finnish: Saksa
- Livonian: Saksāmō
- Romani: Ssassitko temm
- Tornedalian: Saksa, also called Tyskä, influenced by the Swedish Tyskland.
- Veps: Saksanma
- Võro: S'aksamaa

=== From the Proto-Slavic *němьcь ===
(Note: Němьcь 'a foreigner, lit. a mute, e.g. who doesn't speak Slavonic' or unlikely from the name of the ancient Nemetes tribe. See below.)

- Belarusian: Нямеччына (Njamjéččyna)
- Bosnian: Njemačka
- Bulgarian: Немско (Nemsko) (obsolete colloquial)
- Croatian: Njemačka
- Czech: Německo
- Hungarian: Németország
- Kashubian: Miemieckô
- Montenegrin: Njemačka
- Ottoman Turkish: نمچه (nemçe), meaning all Austrian – Holy Roman Empire countries
- Polish: Niemcy
- Serbian: Немачка (Nemačka)
- Silesian: Ńymcy
- Slovak: Nemecko
- Slovene: Nemčija
- Lower Sorbian: Nimska
- Upper Sorbian: Němska
- Ukrainian: Німеччина (Niméččyna)

=== From the name of Prussia ===
- Limburgish: Pruses (mostly in derogatory meaning)
- informal Luxembourgish: Preisen
- informal Twents: De Pruus
- Silesian: Prusacy
- Tahitian: Purutia (also Heremani, see above)

=== Unclear origin ===
(Note: Possibly from the name of the Scandinavian Vagoth tribe or a Baltic word meaning "speak" or "war cry")

- Kursenieki: Vāce Zėm
- Latgalian: Vuoceja
- Latvian: Vācija
- Lithuanian: Vokietija
- Samogitian: Vuokītėjė

=== Other forms ===
- Medieval Greek: Frángoi, frangikós (for Germans, German) – after the Franks.
- Medieval Hebrew: אַשְׁכְּנַז (Ashkenaz), from biblical Ashkenaz, son of Japheth and grandson of Noah, thought to be the ancestor of the Germans.
- Lower Sorbian: bawory or bawery (in older or dialectal use) – from the name of Bavaria.
- Silesian: szwaby from Swabia, bambry used for German colonists from the area around Bamberg, krzyżacy (a derogative form of krzyżowcy – crusaders) referring to Teutonic Order, Rajch or Rajś resembling German pronunciation of Reich.
- Old Norse: Suðrvegr – literally south way (cf. Norway), describing Germanic tribes which invaded continental Europe.
- Kinyarwanda: Ubudage, Kirundi: Ubudagi – thought to derive from the greeting guten Tag used by Germans during the colonial times, or from deutsch.
- Navajo: Béésh Bich'ahii Bikéyah ("Metal Cap-wearer Land"), in reference to Stahlhelm-wearing German soldiers.
- Lakota: Iyášiča Makȟóčhe ("Bad Speaker Land").
- Plains Cree: pîwâpiskwastotininâhk ("Among the Steel Helmets") or mâyakwêsinâhk ("Among the Speakers of a Foreign/Strange Language")
- Sudovian: guti, Old Prussian miksiskai
- Polish (slang of the communist period): Erefen from R.F.N. = F.R.G. (Federal Republic of Germany)
- Polish (pre-Second World War slang): Rajch from German Reich

== Discussion of name origins ==
=== Names from Diutisc ===
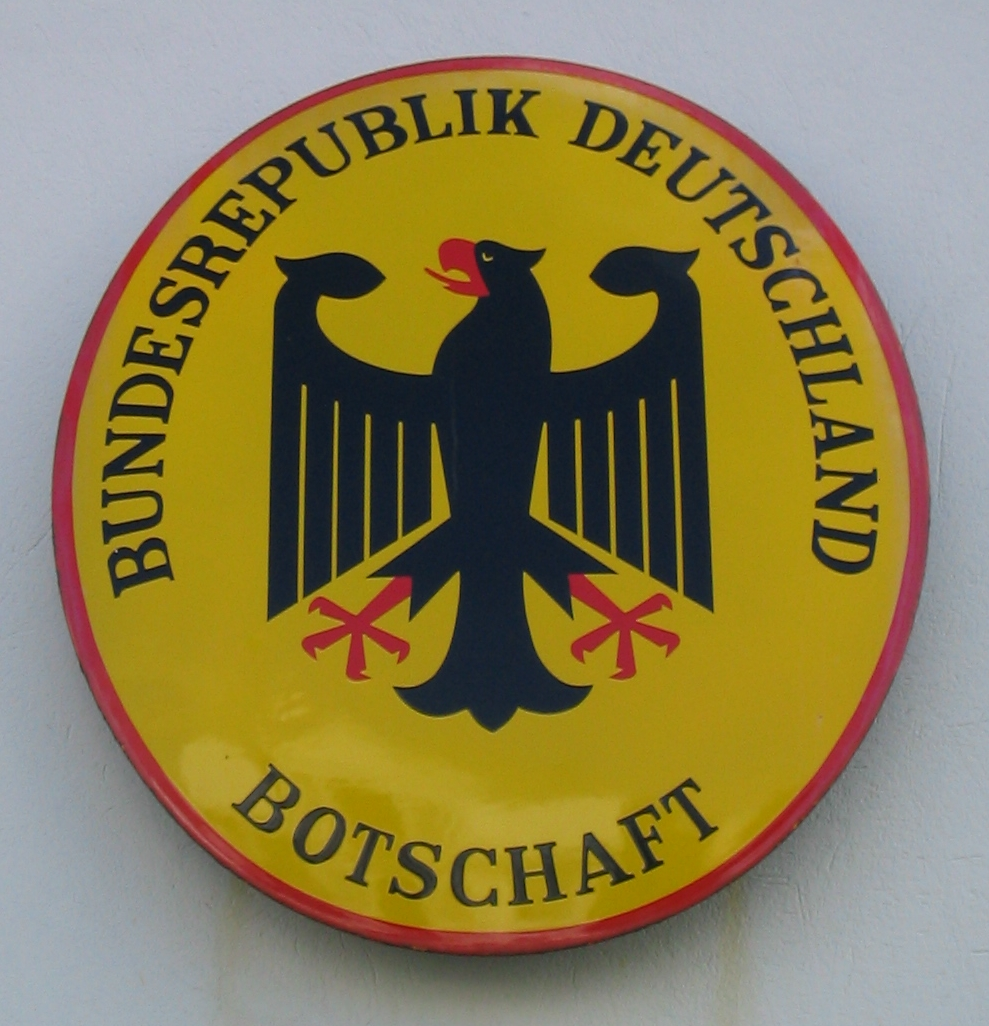
Official German-language plaque of a German embassy

The name Deutschland and the other similar-sounding names above are derived from the Old High German diutisc, or similar variants from Proto-Germanic *Þeudiskaz (Old English þeod), which originally meant "of the people". This in turn comes from a Germanic word meaning "folk" (leading to Old High German diot, Middle High German diet), and was used to differentiate between the speakers of Germanic languages and those who spoke Celtic or Romance languages. These words come from *teuta, the Proto-Indo-European word for "people" (Lithuanian and Latvian tauta, Old Irish tuath).

The Italian for "German", tedesco (local or archaic variants: todesco, tudesco, todisco), comes from the same Old High German root, although not the name for "Germany" (Germania). In the standardised Romansh language, Germania is the normal name for Germany but in Sursilvan, Sutsilvan and Surmiran it is commonly referred to as Tiaratudestga, Tearatudestga and Tera tudestga respectively, with tiara/teara/tera meaning land. French words thiois, tudesque, théotisque and Thiogne, and Spanish tudesco, share this etymology.

The Germanic language which diutisc most likely comes from is West Frankish, a language which died out long ago and has hardly left any written evidence today. This was the Germanic dialect used in the early Middle Ages, spoken by the Franks in Western Francia, i.e. in the region which is now northern France. The word is only known from the Latin form theodiscus. Until the 8th century the Franks called their language frengisk; however, when the Franks moved their political and cultural centre to the area where France now is, the term frengisk became ambiguous, as in the West Francian territory some Franks spoke Latin, some vulgar Latin and some theodisc. For this reason a new word was needed to help differentiate between them. Thus the word theodisc evolved from the Germanic word theoda ("the people") with the Latin suffix -iscus, to mean "belonging to the people", i.e. the people's language.

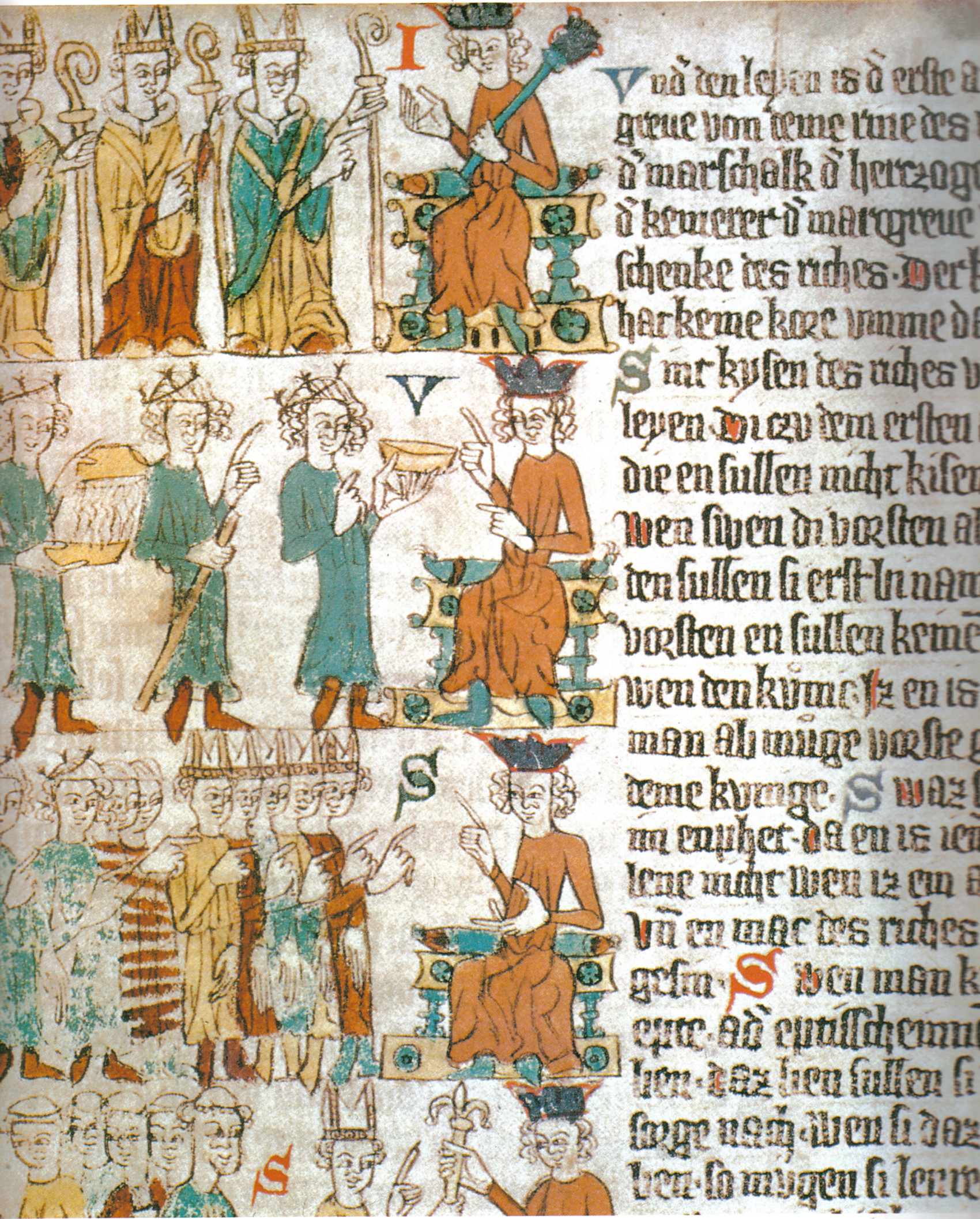
The German princes choose their king (illustration in the Sachsenspiegel).

In Eastern Francia, roughly the area where Germany now is, it seems that the new word was taken on by the people only slowly, over the centuries: in central Eastern Francia the word frengisk was used for a lot longer, as there was no need for people to distinguish themselves from the distant Franks. The word diutsch and other variants were only used by people to describe themselves, at first as an alternative term, from about the 10th century. It was used, for example, in the Sachsenspiegel, a legal code, written in Middle Low German in about 1220: Iewelk düdesch lant hevet sinen palenzgreven: sassen, beieren, vranken unde svaven (Every German land has its Graf: Saxony, Bavaria, Franken and Swabia). In the Carion's Chronicle, the German reformator Philip Melanchthon argued the Germans were descendants of the biblical Ashkenaz, the son of Japheth. They shall have called themselves the Ascenos, which with time derived into Tuiscones.

The Teutoni, a tribe with a name which probably came from the same root, did, through Latin, ultimately give birth to the English words "Teuton" (first found in 1530) for the adjective German, (as in the Teutonic Knights, a military religious order, and the Teutonic Cross) and "Teuton" (noun), attested from 1833. "Teuton" was also used for Teutonisch Land ("land of the Teutons"), its abbreviation Teutschland used in some areas until the 19th century and its currently used official variation Deutschland.

In the northern French language area (northern France, Belgium), the neighboring Germanic dialects, areas and inhabitants of Flanders to Alsace are sometimes referred to as Thiois, most likely still for the area between Maastricht and Aachen and for the traditional German speaking part of Lorraine (Lorraine Thioise), The term is obsolete or colloquial and derives from theodisc (see above). It remains in a more or less distorted form in the name of one of each of the following pairs of villages, separated by a present or past language barrier:

- Heur-le Tiexhe (nl:Diets-Heur) (Belgian Limburg) and Heure-le-Romain (Province of Liège);
- Meix-le-Tige and Meix-devant-Virton (Note: The latter used to be called just Meix; when under Dutch regime a more distinctive name was desired, the mayor proposed Meix-le-Romain but the authorities didn't accept his proposal.) (both in Belgium near French-Luxembourgian border);
- Audun-le-Tiche (French département Moselle) and Audun-le-Roman (Meurthe-et-Moselle).

=== Names from Germania ===
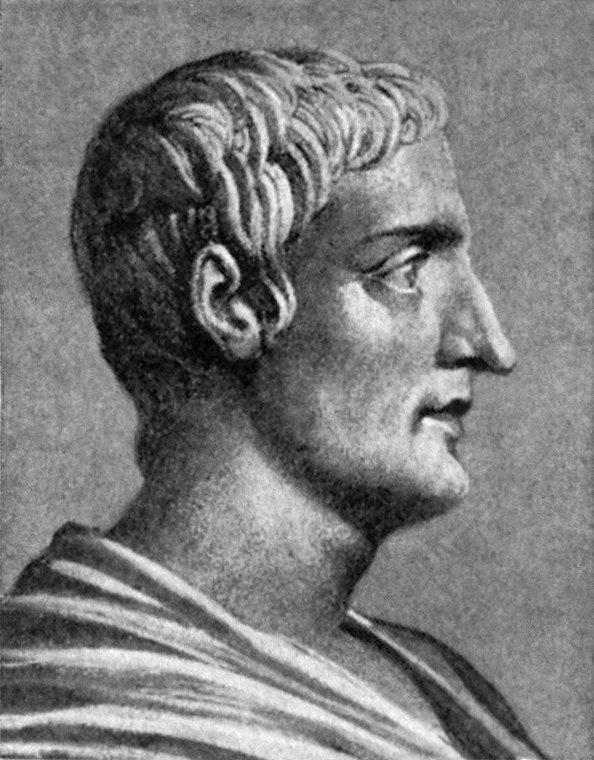
Gaius Cornelius Tacitus

The name Germany and the other similar-sounding names above are all derived from the Latin Germania, of the 3rd century BC, a word simply describing fertile land behind the limes (frontier). It was likely the Gauls who first called the people who crossed east of the Rhine Germani (which the Romans adopted) as the original Germanic tribes did not refer to themselves as Germanus (singular) or Germani (plural).

Julius Caesar was the first to use Germanus in writing when describing tribes in north-eastern Gaul in his Commentarii de Bello Gallico: he records that four northern Belgic tribes, namely the Condrusi, Eburones, Caeraesi and Paemani, were collectively known as Germani. In AD 98, Tacitus wrote Germania (the Latin title was actually: De Origine et situ Germanorum), an ethnographic work on the diverse set of Germanic tribes outside the Roman Empire. Unlike Caesar, Tacitus claims that the name Germani was first applied to the Tungri tribe. The name Tungri is thought to be the endonym corresponding to the exonym Eburones.

19th-century and early 20th-century historians speculated on whether the northern Belgae were Celts or Germanic tribes. Caesar claims that most of the northern Belgae were descended from tribes who had long ago crossed the Rhine from Germania. However many tribal names and personal names or titles recorded are identifiably Celtic. It seems likely that the northern Belgae, due to their intense contact with the Gaulish south, were largely influenced by this southern culture. Tribal names were "qualifications" and could have been translated or given by the Gauls and picked up by Caesar. Perhaps they were Germanic people who had adopted Gaulish titles or names. The Belgians were a political alliance of southern Celtic and northern Germanic tribes. In any case, the Romans were not precise in their ethnography of northern barbarians: by "German(ic)" Caesar meant "originating east of the Rhine". Tacitus wrote in his book Germania: "The Treveri and Nervii take pride in their German origin, stating that this noble blood separates them from all comparison (with the Gauls) and the Gaulish laziness".

The OED2 records theories about the Celtic roots of the Latin word Germania: one is gair, "neighbour" (a theory of Johann Zeuss, a German historian and Celtic philologist) – in Old Irish gair is "neighbour". Another theory is gairm, "battle-cry" (put forward by Johann Wachter and Jacob Grimm, who was a philologist as well as collector and editor of fairy tales). Yet another theory is that the word comes from ger, "spear"; however, Eric Partridge suggests *gar / gavin, "to shout" (as Old Irish garim), describing the Germanic tribesmen as noisy. He describes the ger theory as "obsolete".

In English, the word "German" is first attested in 1520, replacing earlier uses of Almain, Alman and Dutch (the last of which was redirected to be used for people from the Netherlands and their language). In German, the word Germanen today refers to Germanic tribes, just like the Italian noun Germani (adjective: germanici), and the French adjective germanique. The English noun "german" (as in "cousin-german") and the adjective "germane" are not connected to the name for the country, but come from the Latin germanus, "siblings with the same parents or father", which has cognates in Catalan, germà, and Spanish, hermano, meaning "brother".

=== Names from Alemanni ===
The name Allemagne and the other similar-sounding names above are derived from the southern Germanic Alemanni, a Suebic tribe or confederation in today's Alsace, parts of Baden-Württemberg and Switzerland.

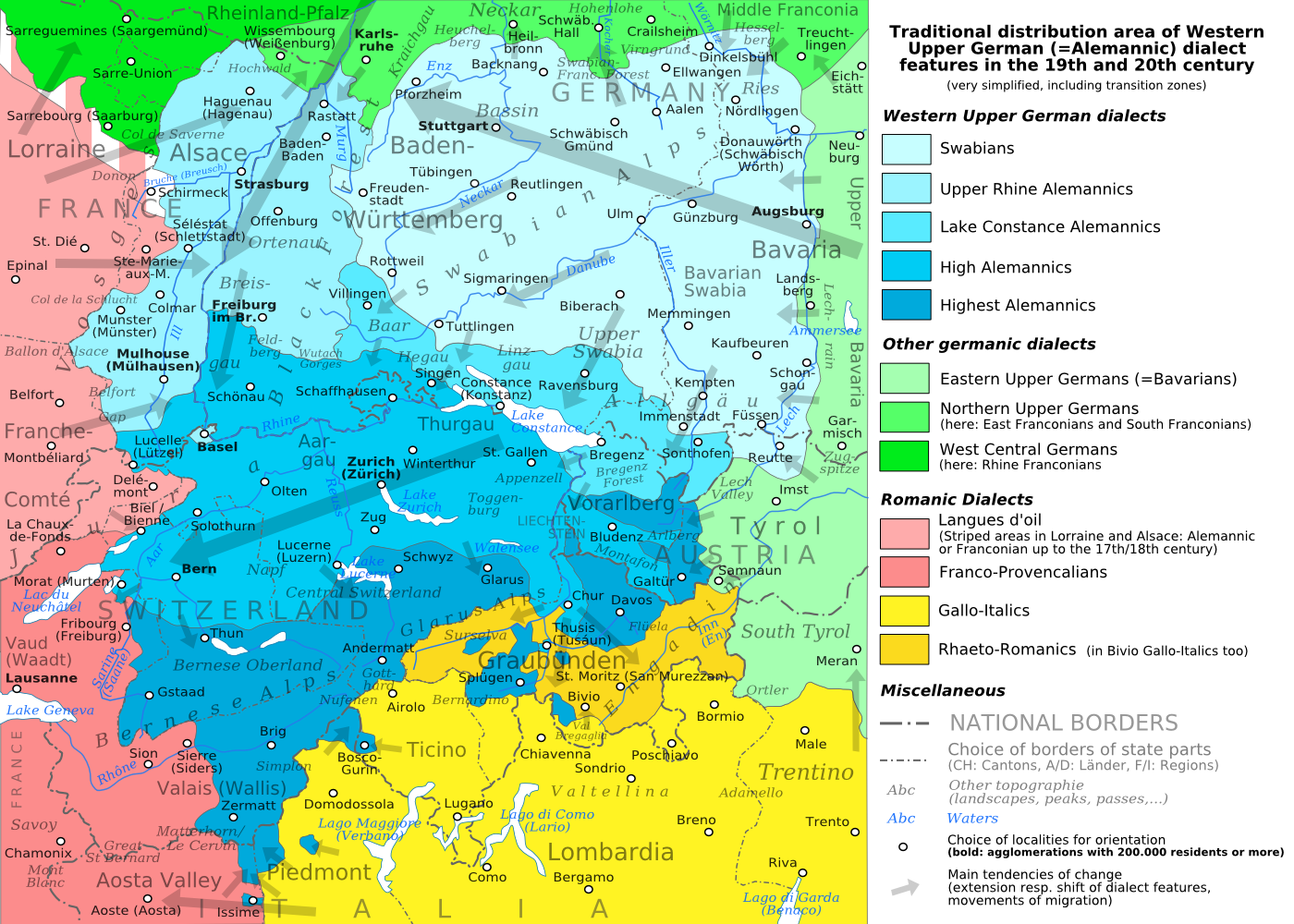
The areas where Alemannic German is spoken

In English, the name "Almain" or "Alman" was used for Germany and for the adjective German until the 16th century, with "German" first attested in 1520, used at first as an alternative then becoming a replacement, maybe inspired mainly by the need to differ them from the more and more independently acting Dutch. In Othello ii,3, (about 1603), for example, Shakespeare uses both "German" and "Almain" when Iago describes the drinking prowess of the English:

I learned it in England, where, indeed, they are most potent in potting: your Dane, your German, and your swag-bellied Hollander—Drink, ho!—are nothing to your English. ... Why, he drinks you, with facility, your Dane dead drunk; he sweats not to overthrow your Almain; he gives your Hollander a vomit, ere the next pottle can be filled.

Andrew Boorde also mentions Germany in his Introduction to Knowledge, c. 1547:

The people of High Almain, they be rude and rusticall, and very boisterous in their speech, and humbly in their apparel ... they do feed grossly, and they will eat maggots as fast as we will eat comfits.

Through this name, the English language has also been given the Allemande (a dance), the Almain rivet and probably the almond furnace, which is probably not really connected to the word "almond" (of Greek origin) but is a corruption of "Almain furnace". In modern German, Alemannisch (Alemannic German) is a group of dialects of the Upper German branch of the Germanic language family, spoken by approximately ten million people in six countries.

Among the indigenous peoples of North America of former French and British colonial areas, the word for "Germany" came primarily as a borrowing from either French or English. For example, in the Anishinaabe languages, three ways to refer to a "German" exist: ᐋᓂᒫ (Aanimaa, originally Aalimaanh, from the French Allemand), ᑌᐦᒋᒪᓐ (Dechiman, from the English Dutchman) and ᒣᐦᔭᑴᑦ (Meyagwed, Ojibwe for "foreign speaker" analogous to Slavic Némcy "mutes" and Arab (ajam) mute), of which Aanimaa is the most common term for a German.

=== Names from Saxon ===
The names Saksamaa and Saksa are derived from the name of the Germanic tribe of the Saxons. The word "Saxon", Proto-Germanic *sakhsan, is believed (a) to be derived from the word seax, meaning a variety of single-edged knives: a Saxon was perhaps literally a swordsman, or (b) to be derived from the word "axe", the region axed between the valleys of the Elbe and Weser.

In Finnish and Estonian the words that historically applied to ancient Saxons changed their meaning over the centuries to denote the whole country of Germany and the Germans. In some Celtic languages the word for the English nationality is derived from Saxon, e.g., the Scottish term Sassenach, the Breton terms Saoz, Saozon, the Cornish terms Sows, Sowson and the Welsh terms Sais, Saeson. "Saxon" also led to the "-sex" ending in Wessex, Essex, Sussex, Middlesex, etc., and of course to "Anglo-Saxon".

The Transylvanian Saxons arrived to Transylvania mainly from the Rhineland, not Saxony.

=== Names from Nemets ===
The Slavic exonym nemets, nemtsy derives from Proto-Slavic němьcь, pl. němьci, "the mutes, not able (to speak)" (from adjective němъ "mute" and suffix -ьcь). In old Slavic sources, the term is not only used for Germans, but also for other peoples such as Scandinavians, Finnic peoples, and Romance peoples.

Danish Slavicist John H. Lind has suggested that the name Nemtsy originated from the so-called trilingual controversy between the Frankish and Byzantine churches in the 9th century AD. The Frankish Church held that god could only be venerated in three sacred languages—Hebrew, Greek and Latin—while the Byzantine Church introduced a liturgy in Church Slavonic. According to Lind, Nemtsy, meaning "mute", was initially applied to the Frankish clergy who refused to pray in vernacular. By the 13th century, it had come to refer more broadly to all peoples under the Latin Church.

Later the use of němьci was narrowed to just Germans. The plural form is used for the Germans instead of any specific country name, e.g. Niemcy in Polish and Ńymcy in Silesian dialect. In other languages, the country's name derives from the adjective němьcьska (zemja) meaning "German (land)" (f.i. Czech Německo). Belarusian Нямеччына (Niamieččyna), and Ukrainian Німеччина (Niméččyna) are also from němьcь but with the addition of the suffix -ina.

According to another theory, Nemtsy may derive from the Rhine-based, Germanic tribe of Nemetes mentioned by Caesar and Tacitus. This etymology is dubious for phonological reasons, as nemetes could not become Slavic němьcь.

In Russian, the adjective for "German", nemetskiy (немецкий) comes from the same Slavic root while the name for the country is Germaniya (Германия). Likewise, in Bulgarian the adjective is nemski (немски) and the country is Germaniya (Германия).

Over time, the Slavic exonym was borrowed by some non-Slavic languages. The Hungarian name for Germany is Németország (from the stem Német-, lit. "Német land"). The popular Romanian name for German is neamț, used alongside the official term, german, which was borrowed from Latin.

According to the Chinese History of Yuan, the Mongol commander Uriyangkhadai took part in the invasion of Poland and of the Holy Roman Empire, described as the land of the Nie-mi-sz.

The Arabic name for Austria, an-Nimsā or an-Namsā (النمسا), appeared during the Crusades era, and it is possible that the term could have been known early by Arabs in Al Andalus. The reason behind calling Austria an-Nimsā, which should designate Germans, is that Arabs considered Austria to be the nation of German people for a long time in the middle ages. On the other hand, the Arabic name of "Germany", Germania or Allemania, took its origin from the Latin names Germania or Alemanni respectively.

The Ottoman Turkish and Persian word for Austria, Nemçe (نمچه), is borrowed from the anterior Arabic name of Austria known throughout the Islamic world, which considered Austria to be the home of the Germans. In the 16th to 17th centuries, the Austrian Empire was also the biggest German-speaking country bordering on the Ottoman Empire.

=== Names from Baltic regions ===
In Latvian and Lithuanian, the names Vācija and Vokietija contain the root vāca or vākiā. Lithuanian linguist Kazimieras Būga associated this with a reference to a Swedish tribe named Vagoths in a 6th-century chronicle (cf. finn. Vuojola and eston. Oju-/Ojamaa, "Gotland", both thought to be derived from the Baltic word; the ethnonym *vakja, used by the Votes (vadja) and the Sami, in older sources (vuowjos), may also be related). So the word for German possibly comes from a name originally given by West Baltic tribes to the Vikings. Latvian linguist Konstantīns Karulis proposes that the word may be based on the Indo-European word *wek ("speak"), from which derive Old Prussian wackis ("war cry") or Latvian vēkšķis. Such names could have been used to describe neighbouring people whose language was incomprehensible to Baltic peoples.

=== Names in East Asia ===
In East Asia, the names have generally been imported directly from German deutsch or Dutch duits in various ways.

The Chinese name is a phonetic approximation of the German proper adjective. The Vietnamese name is based on the Chinese name. The Japanese name is a phonetic approximation of the Dutch proper adjective. The Korean name is based on the Japanese name. This is explained in detail below:

The common Chinese name 德国 (德國, pinyin: Déguó) is a combination of the short form of 德意志 (pinyin: déyìzhì), which approximates the German pronunciation [ˈdɔʏtʃ] of Deutsch "German", plus 國 guó "country".

The Vietnamese name Đức is the Sino-Vietnamese pronunciation (đức [ɗɨ́k]) of the character 德 that appears in the Chinese name.

Japanese language ドイツ (doitsu) is an approximation of the word Deutsch meaning "German". It was earlier written with the Sino-Japanese character compound 獨逸 (whose 獨 has since been simplified to 独), but has been largely superseded by the aforementioned katakana spelling ドイツ. However, the character 独 is still used in compounds, for example 独文 (dokubun) meaning "German literature", or as an abbreviation, such as in 独日関係 (Dokunichi kankei, German-Japanese relations).

The (South) Korean name Dogil (독일) is the Korean pronunciation of the former Japanese name. The compound coined by the Japanese was adapted into Korean, so its characters 獨逸 are not pronounced do+itsu as in Japanese, but dok+il = Dogil. Until the 1980s, South Korean primary textbooks adopted Doichillanteu (도이칠란트) which approximates the German pronunciation [ˈdɔʏtʃlant] of Deutschland.

The official North Korean name toich'willandŭ (도이췰란드) approximates the German pronunciation [ˈdɔʏtʃlant] of Deutschland. Traditionally Dogil (독일) had been used in North Korea until the 1990s. Use of the Chinese name (in its Korean pronunciation Deokguk, 덕국) is attested for the early 20th century. It is now uncommon.

=== Sign languages ===
The sign name for Germany in German Sign Language is a one-handed sign: the hand is placed on the forehead, palm facing sideways, extended index finger facing upwards, with the thumb keeping the other fingers tucked against the palm. The sign may also be used to mean "German language" or "German person", as well as "police" or "police officer". This sign is an iconic one, emulating the shape of a Pickelhaube. It is one of the two signs for "Germany" in American Sign Language, alongside another, in which the dominant hand's wrist is placed on that of the non-dominant hand in front of the signer's chest, with both hands' fingers spread and wiggling. Several other languages also use the Pickelhaube variation as well, with some modifications; others use unrelated signs.

== Etymological history ==
The terminology for "Germany", the "German states" and "Germans" is complicated by the unusual history of Germany over the last 2000 years. This can cause confusion in German and English, as well in other languages. While the notion of Germans and Germany is older, it is only since 1871 that there has been a nation-state of Germany. Later political disagreements and the partition of Germany (1945–1990) have further made it difficult to use proper terminology.

Starting with Charlemagne, the territory of modern Germany was within the realm of the Holy Roman Empire. It was a union of relatively independent rulers who each ruled their own territories. This empire was called in German Heiliges Römisches Reich, with the addition from the late Middle Ages of Deutscher Nation (of (the) German nation), showing that the former idea of a universal realm had given way to a concentration on the German territories.

In 19th- and 20th-century historiography, the Holy Roman Empire was often referred to as Deutsches Reich, creating a link to the later nation state of 1871. Besides the official Heiliges Römisches Reich Deutscher Nation, common expressions are Altes Reich (the Old Realm) and Römisch-Deutsches Kaiserreich (Roman-German Imperial Realm).

=== Pre-modern Germany (pre-1800) ===
Roman authors mentioned a number of tribes they called Germani—the tribes did not themselves use the term. After 1500 these tribes were identified by linguists as belonging to a group of Germanic language speakers (which include modern languages like German, English and Dutch). Germani (for the people) and Germania (for the area where they lived) became the common Latin words for Germans and Germany.

Germans call themselves Deutsche (living in Deutschland). Deutsch is an adjective (Proto-Germanic *theudisk-) derived from Old High German thiota, diota (Proto-Germanic *theudō) meaning "people", "nation", "folk". The word *theudō is cognate with Proto-Celtic *teutā, whence the Celtic tribal name Teuton, later anachronistically applied to the Germans. The term was first used to designate the popular language as opposed to the language used by the religious and secular rulers who used Latin.

In the Late Medieval and Early Modern period, Germany and Germans were known as Almany and Almains in English, via Old French alemaigne, alemans derived from the name of the Alamanni and Alemannia. These English terms were obsolete by the 19th century. At the time, the territory of modern Germany belonged to the realm of the Holy Roman Empire (the Roman Empire restored by the Christian king of Francony, Charlemagne). This feudal state became a union of relatively independent rulers who developed their own territories. Modernisation took place on the territorial level (such as Austria, Prussia, Saxony or Bremen), not on the level of the Empire.

=== 1800–1871 ===
In 1806, the then Holy Roman Emperor Francis II stepped down and effectively dissolved the thousand-year realm of the Holy Roman Empire. Afterwards, French Emperor Napoleon I collected the German City-States, Principalities, Duchies and Kingdoms into a singular body known as the Confederation of the Rhine. It remained a military alliance under the "protection" of Napoleon, rather than consolidating into an actual confederation. After Napoleon's eventual defeat in 1814, the confederation had dissolved and these states created a new German Confederation. Some member states, such as Prussia and Austria, had only a part of their territories included within the confederation, while other member states brought territories to the alliance that included people, like Poles and the Czechs, who did not speak German as their native tongue. In addition, there were also substantial German speaking populations that remained outside the confederation.

In 1841 Hoffmann von Fallersleben wrote the song Das Lied der Deutschen, giving voice to the dreams of a unified Germany (Deutschland über Alles) to replace the alliance of independent states. In this era of emerging national movements, "Germany" was used only as a reference to a particular geographical area.

In 1866/1867 Prussia and her allies left the German Confederation. After Austria was defeated in the Austro-Prussian War of summer 1866, it acknowledged the dissolution of the confederation. Prussia was free to create a new alliance, called the North German Confederation. It became a federal state with its constitution of 1 July 1867. The remaining South German countries, with the exception of Austria and Liechtenstein, joined the country in 1870.

=== German Federation ===
The first nation state named "Germany" began in 1871; before that Germany referred to a geographical entity comprising many states, much as "the Balkans" is used today. In German constitutional history, the expressions Reich (reign, realm, empire) and Bund (federation, confederation) are somewhat interchangeable. Sometimes they even co-existed in the same constitution: for example in the German Empire (1871–1918) the parliament had the name Reichstag, the council of the representatives of the German states Bundesrat. When in 1870–71 the North German Confederation was transformed into the German Empire, the preamble said that the participating monarchs are creating einen ewigen Bund (an eternal confederation) which will have the name Deutsches Reich.

Due to the history of Germany, the principle of federalism is strong. Only the state of Hitler (1933–1945) and the state of the communists (East Germany, 1949–1990) were centralist states. As a result, the words Reich and Bund were used more frequently than in other countries, to distinguish between imperial or federal institutions and those at a subnational level. For example, a modern federal German minister is called Bundesminister, in contrast to a Landesminister who holds office in a state such as Rhineland-Palatinate or Lower Saxony.

As a result of the Hitler regime, and maybe also of Imperial Germany up to 1919, many Germans – especially those on the political left – have negative feelings about the word Reich.

Bund is another word also used in contexts other than politics. Many associations in Germany are federations or have a federalised structure and differentiate between a Bundesebene (federal/national level) and a Landesebene (level of the regional states), in a similar way to the political bodies. An example is the German Football Association Deutscher Fußballbund. (The word Bundestrainer, referring to the national football coach, does not refer to the Federal Republic, but to the Fußballbund itself.)

In other German speaking countries, the words Reich (Austria before 1918) and Bund (Austria since 1918, Switzerland) are used too. An organ named Bundesrat exists in all three of them: in Switzerland it is the government and in Germany and Austria the house of regional representatives.

==== Greater Germany and Großdeutsches Reich ====
In the 19th century before 1871, Germans, for example in the Frankfurt Parliament of 1848–49, argued about what should become of Austria. Including Austria (at least the German-speaking parts) in a future German state was referred to as the Greater German Solution, while a German state without Austria was the Smaller German Solution.

In 1919, the Weimar Constitution postulated the inclusion of Deutsch-Österreich (the German-speaking parts of Austria), but the Western Allies objected to this. It was realised only in 1938 when Germany annexed Austria (Anschluss). National Socialist propaganda proclaimed the realisation of Großdeutschland and, in 1943, the German Reich was officially renamed Großdeutsches Reich. However, these expressions became neither common nor popular.

In National Socialist propaganda, Austria was also called Ostmark. After the Anschluss, the previous territory of Germany was called Altreich (old Reich).

=== German Empire and Weimar Republic of Germany, 1871–1945 ===
The official name of the German state in 1871 became Deutsches Reich, linking itself to the former Reich before 1806 and the rudimentary Reich of 1848/1849. This expression was commonly used in official papers and also on maps, while in other contexts Deutschland was more frequently used.

Those Germans living within its boundaries were called Reichsdeutsche, those outside were called Volksdeutsche (ethnic Germans). The latter expression referred mainly to the German minorities in Eastern Europe. Germans living abroad (for example in America) were and are called Auslandsdeutsche.

After the Emperor was forced to abdicate in 1918 and the republic was declared, Germany was informally called the Deutsche Republik. The official name of the state remained the same. The term Weimar Republic, after the city where the National Assembly gathered, came up in the 1920s, but was not commonly used until the 1950s. It became necessary to find an appropriate term for the Germany between 1871 and 1919: Kaiserliches Deutschland (Imperial Germany) or (Deutsches) Kaiserreich.

==== Nazi Germany ====
After Adolf Hitler took power in 1933, the official name of the state was still the same. For a couple of years, Hitler used the expression Drittes Reich (Third Reich), which was introduced by writers in the last years of the republic. In fact, this was only a propaganda term and did not constitute a new state. Another propaganda term was Tausendjähriges Reich (Thousand years Reich). Later, Hitler renounced the term Drittes Reich (officially in June 1939), but it already had become popular among supporters and opponents and is still used in historiography (sometimes in quotation marks). It later led to the name Zweites Reich (Second Empire) being used to refer to Germany between the years 1871 and 1919. Germany under Hitler's rule is most commonly called in English Nazi Germany, Nazi being a colloquial abbreviation of Nationalsozialist.

=== Germany divided 1945–1990 ===
Occupied Germany in 1947, with western (green, blue and yellow) and eastern (red) occupation zones, and ceded territory (beige)

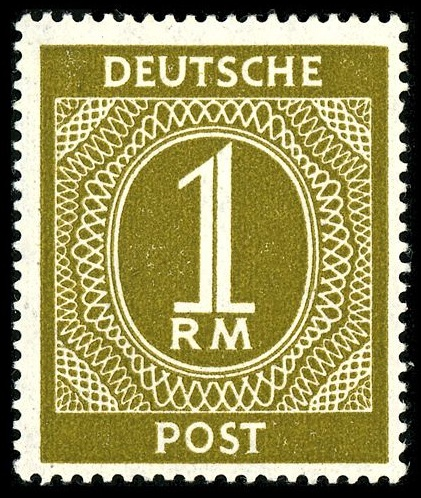
Stamp in occupied Germany, 1946: the neutral expression Deutsche Post instead of Deutsche Reichspost, but still the old currency RM (Reichsmark)

After its defeat in World War II, Germany was occupied by the troops of Britain, France, the United States and the Soviet Union. Berlin was a case of its own, as it was situated on the territory of the Soviet zone but divided into four sectors. The western sectors were later called West Berlin, and the eastern sector East Berlin. The Soviets tended to consider the Soviet sector of Berlin as a part of the GDR and West Berlin an independent political unit. In the GDR, Westberlin was the preferred spelling to de-emphasize the relationship to Berlin, Hauptstadt der DDR (the GDR capital).

After 1945, Deutsches Reich was still used for a couple of years (in 1947, for instance, when the Social Democrats gathered in Nuremberg they called their rally Reichsparteitag). In many contexts, the German people still called their country Germany, even after two German states were created in 1949.

==== Federal Republic of Germany ====
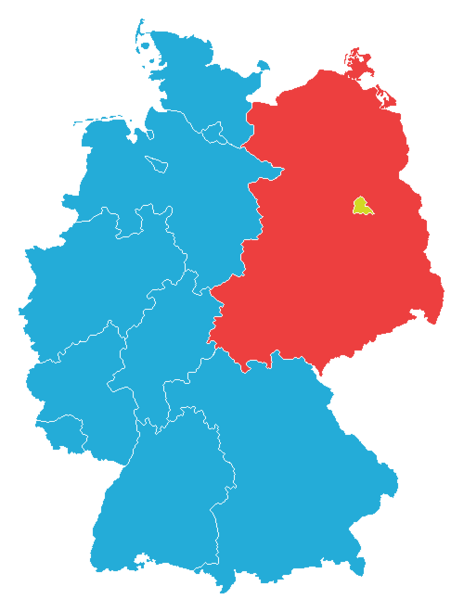
The Federal Republic in blue, GDR in red and West Berlin in yellow, 1949–1990

The Federal Republic of Germany, Bundesrepublik Deutschland, established in 1949, saw itself as the same state founded in 1867/71 but Reich gave place to Bund. For example, the Reichskanzler became the Bundeskanzler, reichsdeutsch became bundesdeutsch, Reichsbürger (citizen of the Reich) became Bundesbürger. Similarly, the names Deutsche Bundesbahn and Deutsche Bundespost, newly used for the railway and post-office systems respectively, replaced Deutsche Reichsbahn and Deutsche Reichspost kept in East Germany.

Germany as a whole was called Deutschland als Ganzes or Gesamtdeutschland, referring to Germany in the international borders of 1937 (before Hitler started to annex other countries). This resulted in all German (or pan germanique—a chauvinist concept) aspirations. In 1969 the Federal Ministry for All German Affairs was renamed the Federal Ministry for Intra-German Relations.

Until 1970, a number of expressions competed in the Federal Republic to designate the other German state (the communist German Democratic Republic). It was called Sowjetische Besatzungszone (SBZ, Soviet Zone of Occupation), Sowjetzone, Ostzone, Mitteldeutschland or Pankow (many GDR politicians lived or worked in Berlin-Pankow).

==== German Democratic Republic ====
International vehicle registration oval including the letters DDR

In 1949, the communists, protected by the Soviet Union, established the Deutsche Demokratische Republik (DDR, German Democratic Republic, GDR). This state was not considered to be a successor of the Reich, but, nevertheless, to represent all good Germans. Rulers and inhabitants of GDR called their state simply DDR or unsere Republik (our republic). The GDR still supported the idea of a German nation and the need for reunification. The Federal Republic was often called Westdeutschland or the BRD. After 1970 the GDR called itself a "socialist state of German nation". Westerners called the GDR Sowjetische Besatzungszone (SBZ, Soviet Zone of Occupation), Sowjetzone, Ostzone, Mitteldeutschland or Pankow (the GDR government was in the Pankow district of Berlin).

=== Federal Republic of Germany 1990–present ===
In 1990 the German Democratic Republic ceased to exist. Five new federal states ("Bundesländer") were established and joined the "Bundesrepublik Deutschland" (Federal Republic of Germany). East Berlin joined through merger with West Berlin; technically this was the sixth new federal state since West Berlin, although considered a de facto federal state, had the legal status of a military occupation zone.

The official name of the country is Federal Republic of Germany (Bundesrepublik Deutschland). The terms Westdeutschland and Ostdeutschland are still used for the western and the eastern parts of the German territory, respectively.

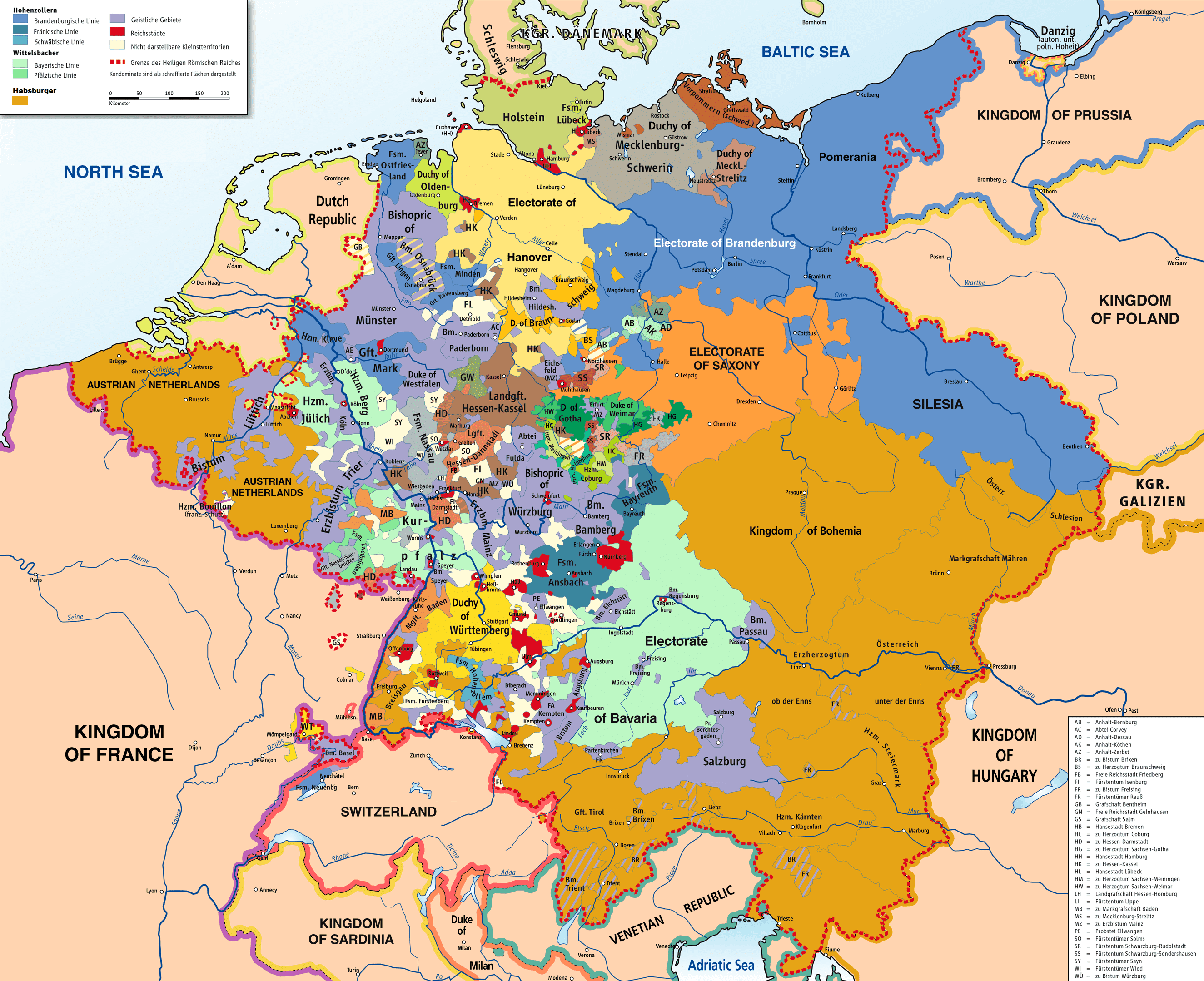
The Holy Roman Empire, 1789

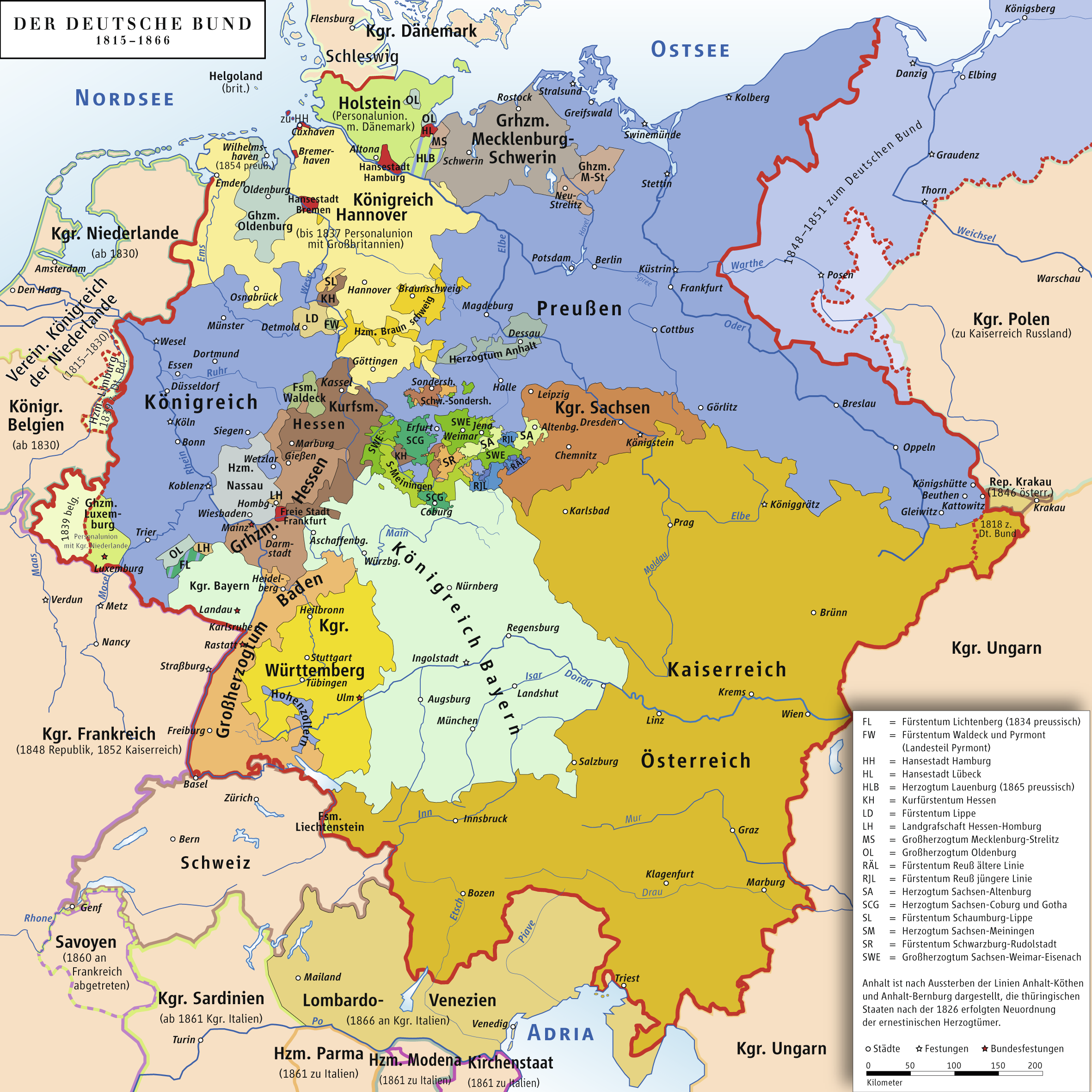
German Confederation, 1815–1866

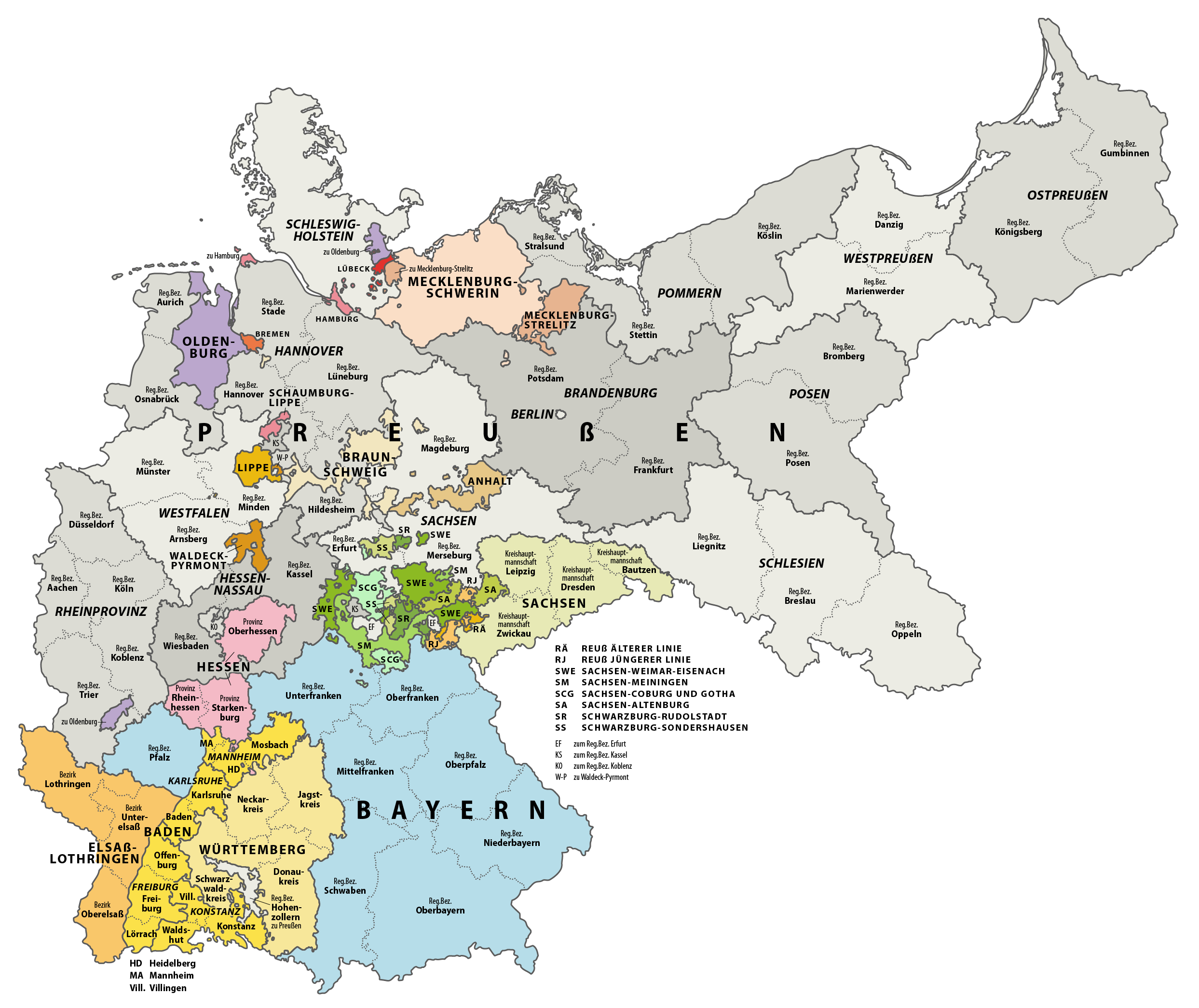
Germany (Deutsches Reich), 1871–1918

Germany (Deutsches Reich), 1919–1937

Nazi Germany, 1944

== See also ==
- Various terms used for Germans
- German placename etymology
- List of country name etymologies
- Territorial evolution of Germany

== Notes ==
By ISO 639-3 code
Enter an ISO code to find the corresponding language article.
