= Inviolata, integra et casta es Maria =

Motet by Josquin des Prez

- Motet by Josquin des Prez
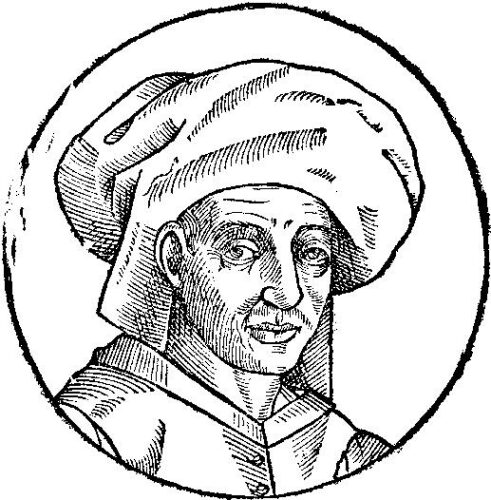
- A 1611 woodcut of Josquin des Prez
- English: You are inviolate, untouched, and chaste, Mary
- Language: Latin
- Based on: Inviolata from Basilica of Our Lady, Tongeren
- Published: c. 1519
- Scoring: Five voices

Inviolata, integra et casta es Maria (You are inviolate, untouched, and chaste, Mary) is a motet by Josquin des Prez. One of his most famous compositions, it divides the cantus firmus into three sections and is scored for five voices—two carrying the canonical melody and three free.

== History ==
Composed by Josquin des Prez, the motet first appeared in print around 1519, with the publication of Motetti de la corona, libro quarto by Ottaviano Petrucci. The cantus firmus is a twelfth-century Gregorian melody titled Inviolata that was traditionally performed during Candlemas; Josquin based his composition on a particular version of Inviolata sung at the Basilica of Our Lady, Tongeren.

== Structure ==
The motet is scored for five voices: three free ones and two singing the cantus firmus, which is divided into three sections and expressed in whole notes. The time interval between the voices singing the cantus firmus decreases with each section, from three breves to two to one. In the opening bars (1–15), perfect modus is employed, creating a dignified atmosphere, whereas imperfect modus is established at the start of the second part. The five-breve phrase "O benigna, O regina, O Maria" is repeated thrice in the third section, with all five voices singing the same chords. In total, the motet is made up of some 144 (12 x 12) breves, a reference to the "holy" figure associated with Mary and the "woman of the apocalypse" with "a crown of twelve stars" around her head in the Book of Revelation.

== Legacy ==
The motet is one of Josquin's most famous works, and was reworked by several composers especially during the early sixteenth century, such as Antonio de Cabezón and Philippe Verdelot.

== See also ==
- List of compositions by Josquin des Prez
