= Mal, Tongeren =

Village in Limburg, Belgium

Coordinates: 50°46′07″N 5°31′18″E

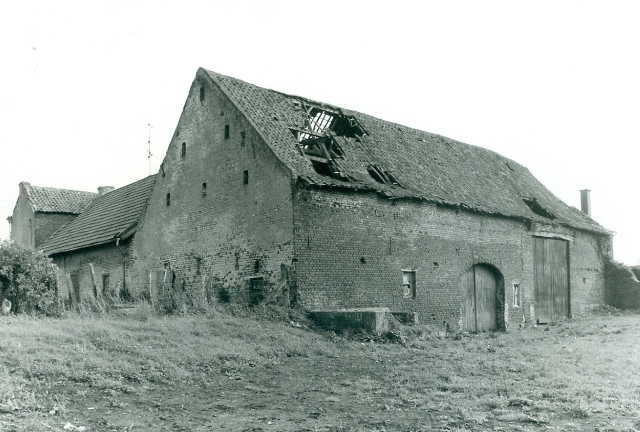
A 17th-century courtyard farmhouse in Mal

Mal is a village near the city of Tongeren in the province of Limburg (Belgium), which became a subdivision of the city at the 1977 fusion of the Belgian municipalities. It has a surface area of 399 hectares. It is historically an agricultural village, with cereal and sugar beet production, and alluvial meadows in the valley of the river Jeker. The population in 1988 was 836.

== History ==
The oldest signs of human occupation are graves from the Roman period, with the old Roman road from Bavay to Cologne running through the area. The oldest recorded mention of the village, as Malla, dates from 1111. The medieval lordship of Mal was subject to the Prince-bishopric of Liège, with the Van Elderen family being considerable local landowners.

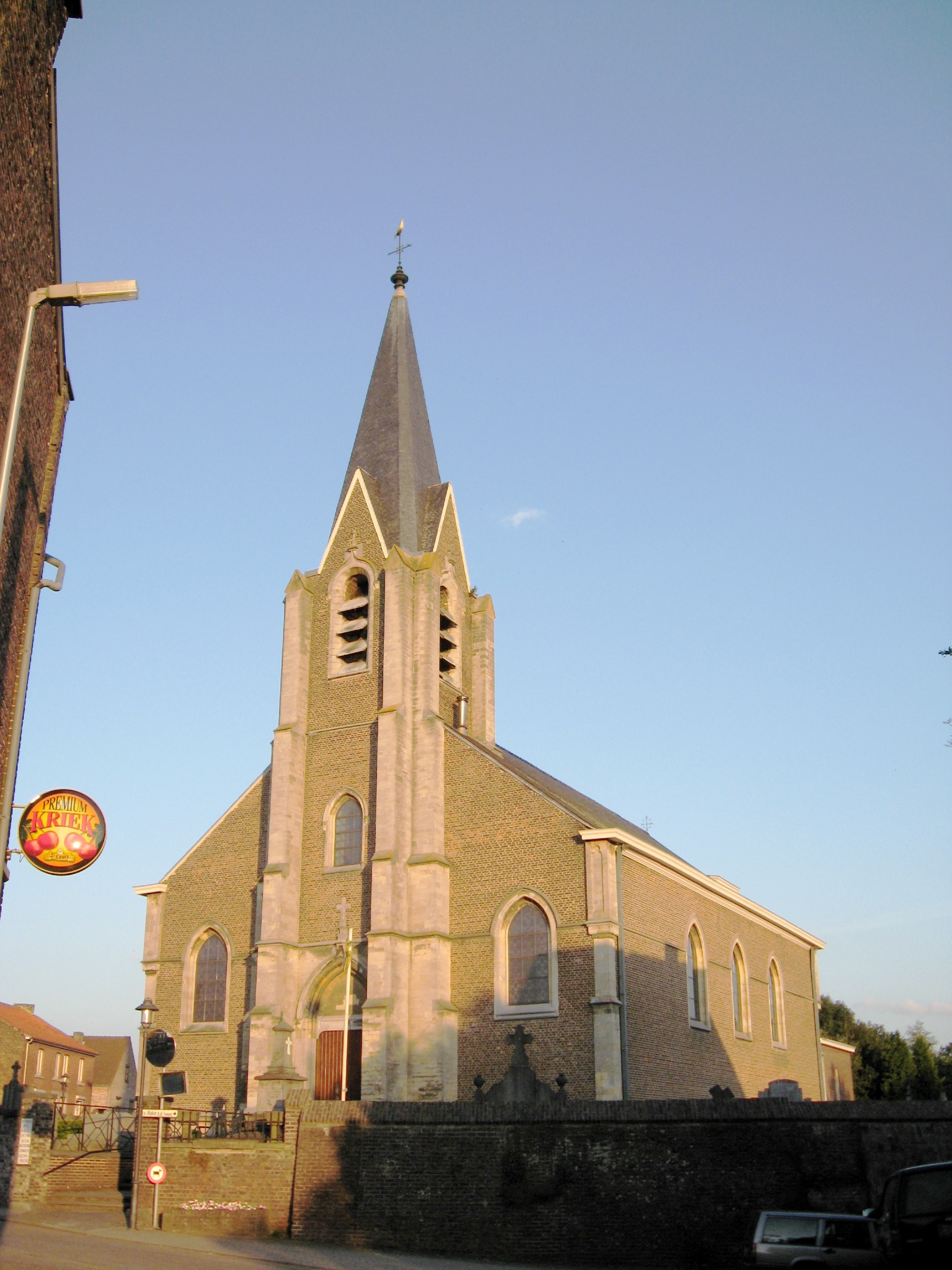
Church of the Finding of the Holy Cross, Mal

The church of Mal dates back to the 9th century, originally as a chapel of ease and by the 13th century a full parish that also came to include the nearby village of Sluizen. A history of the dual parish was written in the 18th century by the parish priest, Gerard Joseph Van der Meer, as Acta pastorum de Mall et Sluysen, and partially published posthumously. Parish priests can be identified as far back as 1314. The tithes were paid to Tongeren minster, and the right of presentment was claimed both by the chapter of that church and by the Old University of Leuven. The medieval church, built in Romanesque style, was demolished in 1845 and replaced with a Neogothic structure in brick, designed by Joseph Dumont.
