= Council of the Realm =

Council of the Realm may refer to:

- Council of the Realm (Spain), a corporate organ of Francoist Spain (1947–1978)
- Reichsrat (Austria), the parliament of the Cisleithanian part of Austria-Hungary (1867–1918)
- Reichsrat (Germany), a body representing the German States in the Weimar Republic (1919–1933)
- Riksråd, various Royal Councils in Scandinavian countries
- Riksrådet, the Privy Council of Sweden

== See also ==
- Council of the State
- Privy council
- Imperial Council (disambiguation), literal translation
