= Reichstag =

Reichstag is a German word generally meaning parliament, more directly translated as Diet of the Realm or National Diet, or more loosely as Imperial Diet. It may refer to:

== Buildings and places ==
Reichstagsgebäude is the specific German word for the German parliament buildings, often shortened to Reichstag, and may refer to:

- Reichstag building, the building where German Parliaments met from 1894 to 1933 and since 1999
  - Reichstag dome, an addition to the Reichstag by Norman Foster 1995–1999
  - Reichstag, former name of the U-Bahn station at the Reichstag, renamed Bundestag in 2006

== Institutions ==
Historic legislative bodies in German-speaking countries have been referred to as Reichstag, including:

- Imperial Diet (Holy Roman Empire), called the Reichstag from about 15th century, earlier known as the Hoftag (777–1806)
- Imperial Diet (Austria), first elected parliament of Austria (1848–1849), known as the Reichstag
- Reichstag (North German Confederation), parliament of the North German Confederation (1867–1870)
- Reichstag (German Empire), parliament of the German Empire (1871–1918)
- Reichstag (Weimar Republic), parliament of the Weimar Republic (1919–1933)
- Reichstag (Nazi Germany), pseudo-parliament of the Third Reich (1933–1945)
- Bundestag
- Scandinavian parliamentary bodies which bear or bore the name Riksdag are also called Reichstag when referred to in the German language; these words have the same origin.

== Historic events ==
- Diet of Worms (German: Reichstag zu Worms), Imperial Diet in 1521 at which Martin Luther was declared a heretic
- Diet of Augsburg (German: Reichstag zu Augsburg), noteworthy sessions of the Imperial Diet in 1530 and 1555
- Reichstag fire (1933)

== See also ==
- Bundestag, and German Bundesrat, the two legislative bodies in the Federal Republic of Germany
- Bundesrat (disambiguation)
- Reichsrat (disambiguation), roughly "Imperial Council", a smaller more powerful legislative body in several German-speaking countries, similar to the Upper House of a Parliament
- Imperial Diet (disambiguation)
- Riksdag, the parliaments of Sweden and Finland, the latter called eduskunta in the Finnish language
- Rigsdagen, the parliament of Denmark from 1849 to 1953,
- Riksråd, generic name in Scandinavian countries for various Councils of the Realm,
