= Gerard Joseph Van der Meer =

Clergyman, controversialist and historian (1684 – 1730)

Gerard Joseph Van der Meer (1684–1730) was a Catholic clergyman, controversialist and historian from the Low Countries.

== Life ==
Van der Meer was born in Tongeren in the Prince-Bishopric of Liège on 18 March 1684, the son of Christiaan Van der Meer and Elisabeth Somers. He studied at the school of the Canons Regular of St Augustine in Tongeren and at the Diocesan Seminary of Liège.

He received the tonsure on 22 March 1704, and was ordained to the priesthood on 14 June 1710. After spending half a year at the Wognum station on the Holland Mission he was appointed vicar of the Church of St Matthias, Maastricht. As the church was in Protestant hands, he exercised his parochial function from St Catherine's Chapel, Maastricht, where he became involved in a controversy with the curate, Franciscus Peeters, against whom he published the pamphlet Maestrichter Jan.

In 1713 he was transferred to Ulbeek, and the following year published another anti-Jansenist pamphlet. On 6 December 1714 he was appointed parish priest of the village of Mal (now part of Tongeren), but his installation was delayed because the University of Leuven claimed the right of presentment. His appointment was confirmed by a papal bull on 3 February 1715, after the university had withdrawn its objection.

He went on to publish three treatises against the abuse of dispensations from matrimonial banns. He also left a manuscript history of his parish, Acta pastorum de Mall et Sluysen, parts of which were published in 1893. He died in Maastricht on 7 August 1730. He had made his will on 5 August, leaving a patch of land to the church of Mal to maintain an annuity to commemorate his service there.

== Writings ==
- Maestrichter Jan of het Jansenisdom van den heer Franciscus Peeters, onderpastoor van Sinte-Catharina tot Maestricht (1713)
- Le miserere d'un janséniste pénitent qui se reproche devant Dieu ses iniquités janséniennes (Liège, Beauduin Broncart, 1714)
- Rubrum sigillum noxium (Maastricht, Hertus, 1719)
