= Imperial Diet =

Imperial Diet means the highest representative assembly in an empire, notably:

- Imperial Diet (Holy Roman Empire), the general assembly of the Imperial Estates of the Holy Roman Empire (962–1806)
- National Diet, the current legislature of Japan (1889–)
- Imperial Diet (Austria), short-lived body that represented the non-Hungarian lands of the Austrian Empire (1848–1849)

== See also ==
- Diet (assembly)
- Reichstag (disambiguation)
