= Riksdag (disambiguation) =

The Riksdag is the unicameral parliament of Sweden.

It may also refer to:

== Legislative assemblies ==
- Parliament of Sweden also Riksdagen
- Parliament of Finland, officially called Riksdagen in Swedish
- Riksdag of the Estates, the feudal legislature in Sweden from 1486 to 1866 and in Finland until 1809

== Buildings ==
Riksdagshuset, the specific Swedish word for the Parliamentary buildings, often simply shortened to Riksdagen. In this context it may refer to:

- Parliament House, Stockholm
- Parliament House, Helsinki

== See also ==
- Reichstag (disambiguation), the German term for parliament, translated to Riksdag in Swedish
- Riigikogu, the national legislature of Estonia
- Rigsdagen, the legislature of Denmark from 1849 to 1953
- Riksråd, generic term for various Royal Councils in Scandinavian countries
- Reichsrat (disambiguation), German cognate of Riksråd
