= Reichsrat =

Reichsrat is a legislative body in German-speaking countries similar to the Upper House of a Parliament. Specifically, it may refer to:

- Reichsrat (Austria), the parliament of the Cisleithanian part of Austria-Hungary (1867–1918)
- Reichsrat (Germany), a body representing the German States in the Weimar Republic (1919–1933)

== See also ==
- Riksråd, various Royal Councils in Scandinavian countries
- Riksrådet, the Privy Council of Sweden
- Reichstag (disambiguation), the directly elected body or Lower House of parliaments in various German-speaking countries
- Riksdag (disambiguation), the cognate of Reichstag in Scandinavian countries
- Rigsdagen, Parliament of Denmark (1849–1953)
- In modern Germany, the Bundestag and Bundesrat are the two chambers of parliament
- Imperial Council (disambiguation), literal translation
