= Good Cities =

The Good Cities (French: Bonnes Villes) were the most important cities of the Prince-Bishopric of Liège (980–1795). If considered a Good City, the city was allowed to build a city wall; partake in the States of Liège; and erect a perron symbolising the autonomy and freedom of Liège.

In 1651 the Good Cities numbered 23, and they were grouped in either the so-called villes thioises —contemporarily this referred to what now would be termed Dutch or Flemish cities— or the villes françoises (contemporarily French or Walloon cities). All of these Good Cities are located within present-day Belgium; the Prince-Bishopric's territories included at times parts in modern-day Netherlands, France and Germany as well.

Two other major cities of the Prince-Bishopric had a special statute, which differentiated them from the Good Cities as they were not allowed to be represented at the States of Liège. One of these was the condominium of Maastricht, an area of joint sovereignty shared by the Prince-Bishopric of Liège and the Duchy of Brabant.

== The cities ==
Villes thioises

City	Current Belgian:	
City	Province	Region
Beringen	Limburg	Flemish
Bilzen	Limburg	Flemish
Borgloon (then named Loon)	Limburg	Flemish
Bree	Limburg	Flemish
Hamont	Limburg	Flemish
Hasselt	Limburg	Flemish
Herk-de-Stad	Limburg	Flemish
Maaseik	Limburg	Flemish
Peer	Limburg	Flemish
Sint-Truiden	Limburg	Flemish
Stokkem	Limburg	Flemish
Tongeren	Limburg	Flemish

Villes françoises

City	Current Belgian:	
City	Province	Region
Châtelet	Hainaut	Wallonia
Ciney	Namur	Wallonia
Couvin	Namur	Wallonia
Dinant	Namur	Wallonia
Fosses-la-Ville	Namur	Wallonia
Huy	Liège	Wallonia
Liège	Liège	Wallonia
Thuin	Hainaut	Wallonia
Verviers	Liège	Wallonia
Visé	Liège	Wallonia
Waremme	Liège	Wallonia

Cities with a special statute

In the condominium of Maastricht – , the Prince-Bishopric shared a joint authority with the Duchy of Brabant and later the Dutch Republic – . The Duchy of Bouillon was a subject of the Prince-Bishopric.

City	Current:	
City	Province (Country)	Region
Bouillon	Luxembourg (Belgium)	Wallonia
Maastricht	Limburg (Netherlands)	—N/a
