= Imperial Council =

Imperial Council may refer to:

- Imperial Council (Austria) or Reichsrat (1867–1918), was the parliament of the Cisleithanian part of the Austro-Hungarian Empire
- Imperial Council (Ottoman Empire), the government of the Ottoman Empire until 1908
- State Council of Imperial Russia, was the supreme state advisory body to the Tsar in Imperial Russia

== See also ==
- Reichsrat (disambiguation)
