= Vagoth =

Germanic tribe from Scandza

The word uagoth (underlined in red) in an early 9th-century copy of Jordanes' Getica

The Vagoth (Latinised Vagothae) were a Germanic tribe mentioned by Jordanes as living in Scandza. They have been identified with the Geats of Vikbolandet and with the Gutes of Gotland, both in Sweden. They have been variously connected with the two places named by Jordanes, the vastissimus lacus (most vast lake) and the Vagi fluvens (river Vagi). Karl Zeuss thought Vagoth to be a misspelling of Vagos and connected them to the Vagar who later appeared in the Dovrefjell of Norway. Karl Müllenhoff, too, thought the term a corruption. He proposed *Augothi or *Avigothi (Norse *Eygutar) and placed them in Öland.

According to Lithuanian linguist Kazimieras Būga, the Vagoths have given name to Germans and Germany in Lithuanian and Latvian languages (vokietis, vācietis and Vokietija, Vācija), and to Gotland in Finnish and Estonian (Vuojonmaa, Ojamaa "maa" = land). The Latvian linguist Konstantīns Karulis, known for his Dictionary of Latvian Etymology (1992), sees another etymology, similar to in Slavic languages. The name for Germanics may mean approximately "neighbors who speak an incomprehensible language", and be derived from wekʷ, a proto-Indo-European root meaning to speak or to sound, which makes Būga's explanation less attractive.

== See also ==
- List of ancient Germanic peoples
- Goths
