= Diets-Heur =

Diets-Heur Heure-le-Tixhe
- Village
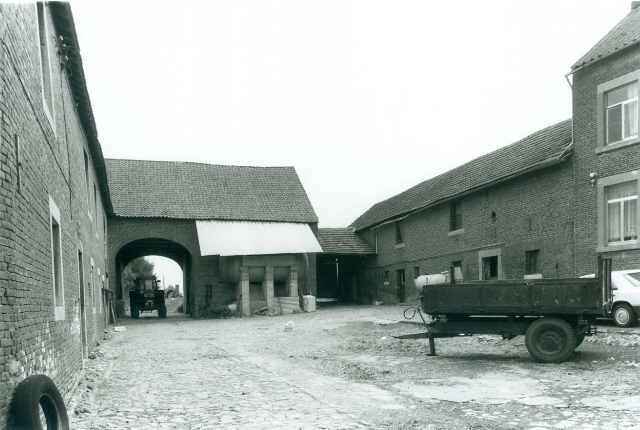

- Location in Belgium
- Coordinates: 50°45′N 5°29′E
- Country: Belgium
- Community: Flemish Community
- Province: Limburg
- Municipality: Tongeren

Area
  - Total: 3.96 km^{2} (1.53 sq mi)

Population (2017)
  - Total: 362
  - Density: 91.4/km^{2} (237/sq mi)
- Time zone: CET

Diets-Heur (French: Heure-le-Tixhe) is a village and deelgemeente of Tongeren in the province of Limburg, Flemish region, Belgium. Diets-Heur is a small, rural village with a population of 362 people in 2017.

== History ==
Diets-Heur means Dutch-Heur in old Dutch and differentiates the village from Heure-le-Romain (Romance or French Heur) 15 kilometers away in Wallonia. Diets-Heur was first mentioned in 1258 as Eure, and was sometimes referred to as Ora Teutonica. Two Roman villas have been discovered near the village. The village was located on the medieval road from Tongeren to Bavai which later became known as the Via Belgica. In 1795, the village became an independent municipality. In 1970, Diets-Heur merged into the municipality of Vreren which in turn merged into Tongeren in 1977.

During the 20th century, the village became a residential village for commuters with some agriculture.
