= Diet (assembly) =

Type of deliberative assembly

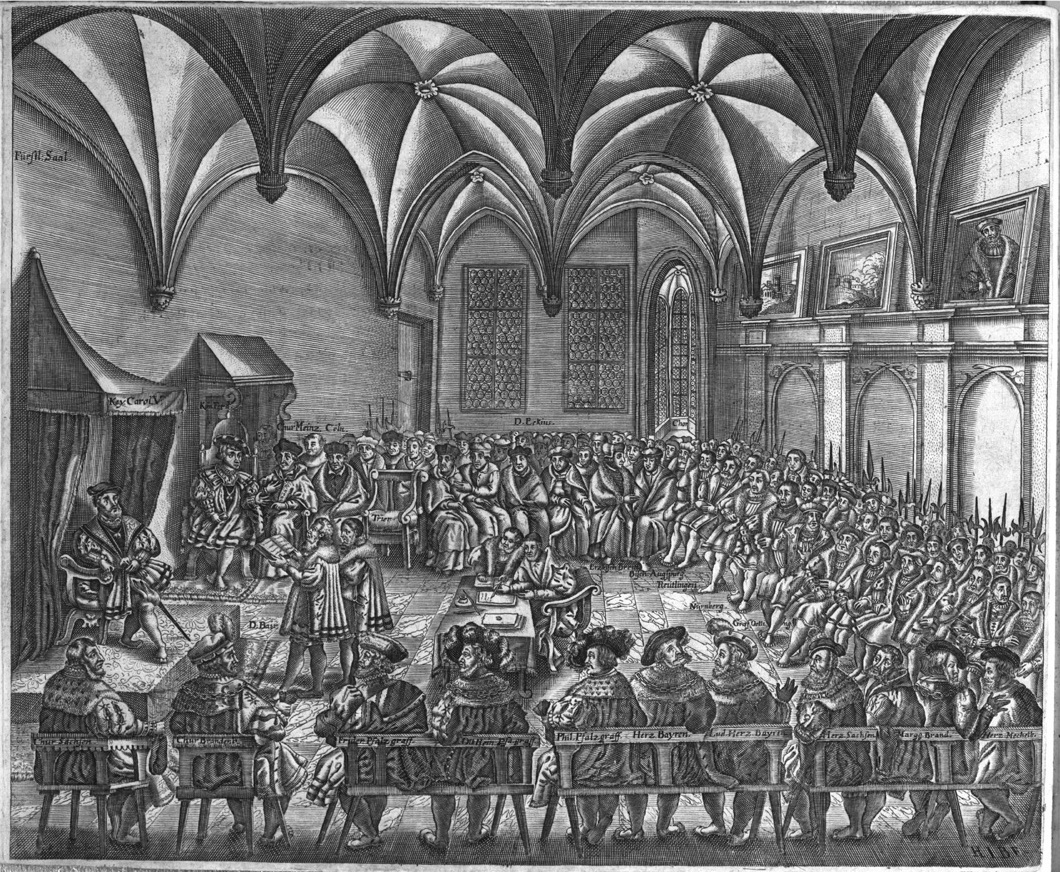
Diet of Augsburg by Christian Beyer

In politics, a diet (/ˈdaɪ.ət/ DY-ət) is a formal deliberative assembly or legislature. The term is used for some assemblies such as the German Imperial Diet (the general assembly of the Imperial Estates of the Holy Roman Empire), as well as a designation for modern-day legislative bodies of certain countries and states such as the National Diet of Japan, or the German Bundestag, the Federal Diet.

== Etymology ==
The term (also in the nutritional sense) might be derived from Medieval Latin dieta, meaning both "parliamentary assembly" and "daily food allowance", from earlier Latin diaeta, possibly from the Greek διαιτησία ("arbitration"), or Classical Greek δίαιτα (diaita), meaning "way of living", and hence also "diet" (regular food), "regular (daily) work".

Through a false etymology, reflected in Latin spelling change in medieval Europe that replaced the ae with e, the word diaeta came to be associated with another Latin word dies, which means "day". Day thus came to be used in postclassical Europe in the sense of "an assembly" and retroactively explained that the day referred to the day of the assembly meeting.

The association with dies is reflected in the German language's use of Tagung (meeting) and also -tag, meaning not only "day", as in Montag (Monday) but also "parliament", "council", or other legislative chamber, as in Bundestag or Reichstag for national parliaments, and Landtag for regional assemblies.

== Historic uses ==
In this sense, it commonly refers to the Imperial Diet assemblies of the Holy Roman Empire:

- Diet of Augsburg
- Diet of Nuremberg
- Diet of Regensburg
- Diet of Speyer
- Diet of Worms

After the Second Peace of Thorn of 1466, a German-language Prussian diet Landtag was held in the lands of Royal Prussia, a province of Poland in personal union with the king of Poland.

The Croatian word for a legislative assembly is sabor (from the verb sabrati se, "to assemble"); in historic contexts it is often translated with "diet" in English, as in "the Diet of Dalmatia" (Dalmatinski sabor), "the Croatian Diet" (Hrvatski sabor), "the Hungarian-Croatian Diet" (Ugarsko-hrvatski sabor), or Diet of Bosnia (Bosansko-hercegovački sabor).

The Diet of Hungary, customarily called together every three years in Székesfehérvár, Buda or Pressburg, was also called "Diéta" in the Habsburg Empire before the 1848 revolution.

The Riksdag of the Estates was the diet of the four estates of Sweden, from the 15th century until 1866. The Diet of Finland was the successor to the Riksdag of the Estates in the Grand Duchy of Finland, from 1809 to 1906.

The Swiss legislature was the Tagsatzung (French: Diète) before the Federal Assembly replaced it in the mid-19th century.

The Polish–Lithuanian Sejm was sometimes called a diet.

== Current use ==
- The National Diet of Japan, the country's legislative body.
- Some universities in the UK and India refer to the period of formal examination and the conclusion of an academic term as an "examination diet".
- Scottish legal procedures include diets of proof, debate, appeal or meeting which may be ordered by a court.
- -tag, German name for legislatures such as the Bundestag (lit. "Federal Diet")
- Riksdag, the Swedish name for the parliament (translated as "Diet of the Realm")

== See also ==
- Federal Assembly
- Landtag
- The Estates (States)
- List of legislatures by country
- Thing (assembly)
- Reichstag (disambiguation)
- National Assembly
