= Tongeren =

City in Limburg, Belgium

Tongeren: Tongres (French); Tongern (German)
- City and municipality
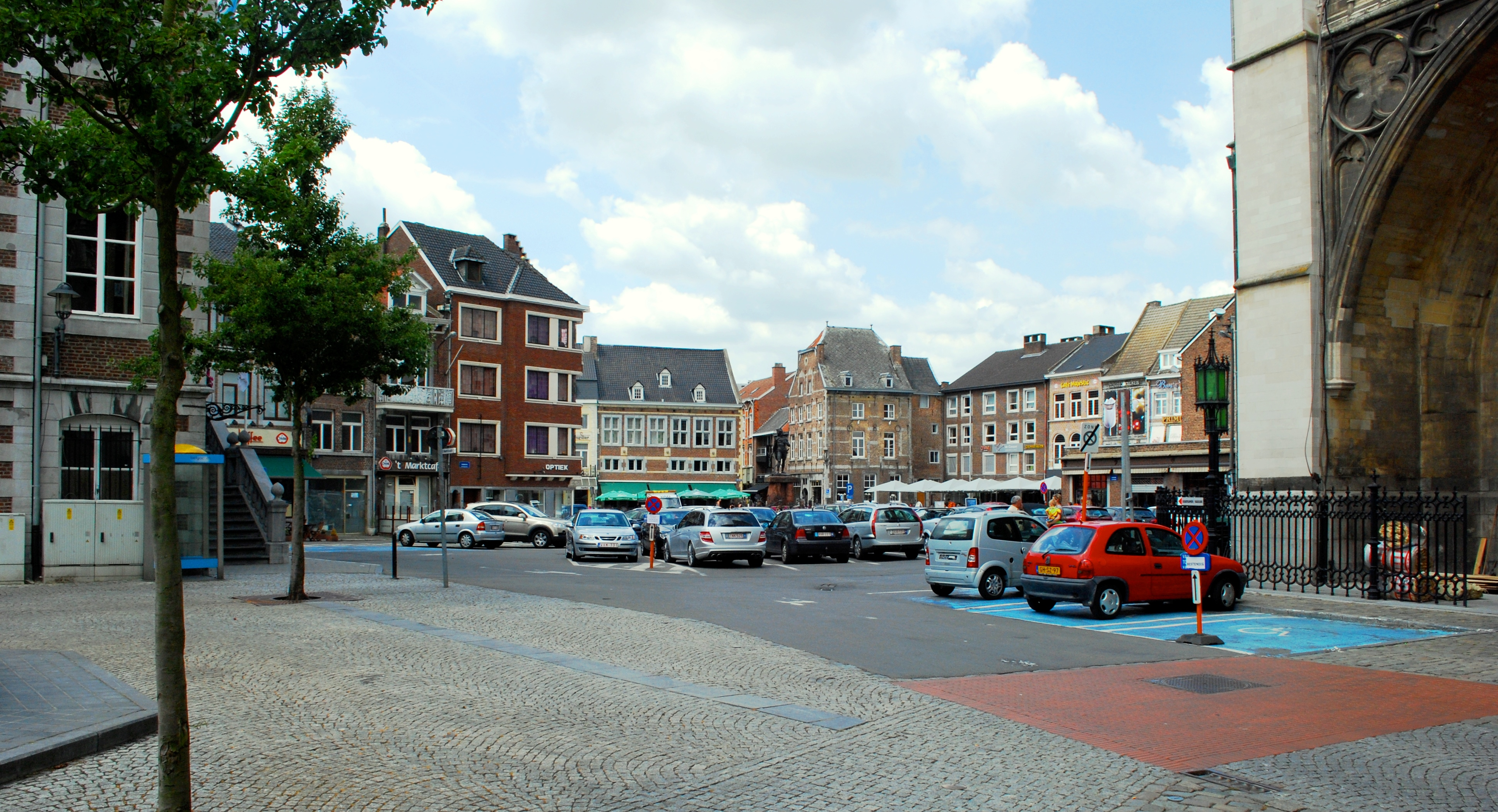
- View of the Grote Markt

- Flag Coat of arms

- Location of Tongeren in Limburg
- Interactive map of Tongeren
- Location in Belgium
- Coordinates: 50°47′N 05°28′E
- Country: Belgium
- Community: Flemish Community
- Region: Flemish Region
- Province: Limburg
- Arrondissement: Tongeren

Population (2020-01-01)
  - Total: 31,142
- Postal codes: 3700
- NIS code: 73083
- Area codes: 012
- Website: www.tongeren.be

Tongeren (Dutch: [ˈtɔŋərə(n)]; French: Tongres [tɔ̃ɡʁ]; German: Tongern [ˈtɔŋɐn]; Limburgish: Tóngere [ˈtʊŋəʀə]) is a city and former municipality located in the Belgian province of Limburg, in the southeastern corner of the Flemish region of Belgium. Tongeren is the oldest town in Belgium, as the only Roman administrative capital within the country's borders. As a Roman city, it was inhabited by the Tungri, and known as Atuatuca Tungrorum, it was the administrative centre of the Civitas Tungrorum district. Since 1 January 2025, it is part of the new municipality Tongeren-Borgloon.

== History ==
=== Atuatuca Tungrorum ===
The Romans referred to Tongeren as Aduatuca Tungrorum or Atuatuca Tongrorum, and it was the capital of the large Roman province of Civitas Tungrorum, an area which covered modern Belgian Limburg, and at least parts of all the areas around it. Before the Roman conquests, this area was inhabited by the group of Belgic tribes known as the Germani cisrhenani. (Despite being known as the Germani, whether they spoke a Germanic language is debated, and the names of their tribes and their leaders were Celtic.) Specifically the Eburones were the largest of these tribes and the one living around Tongeren.

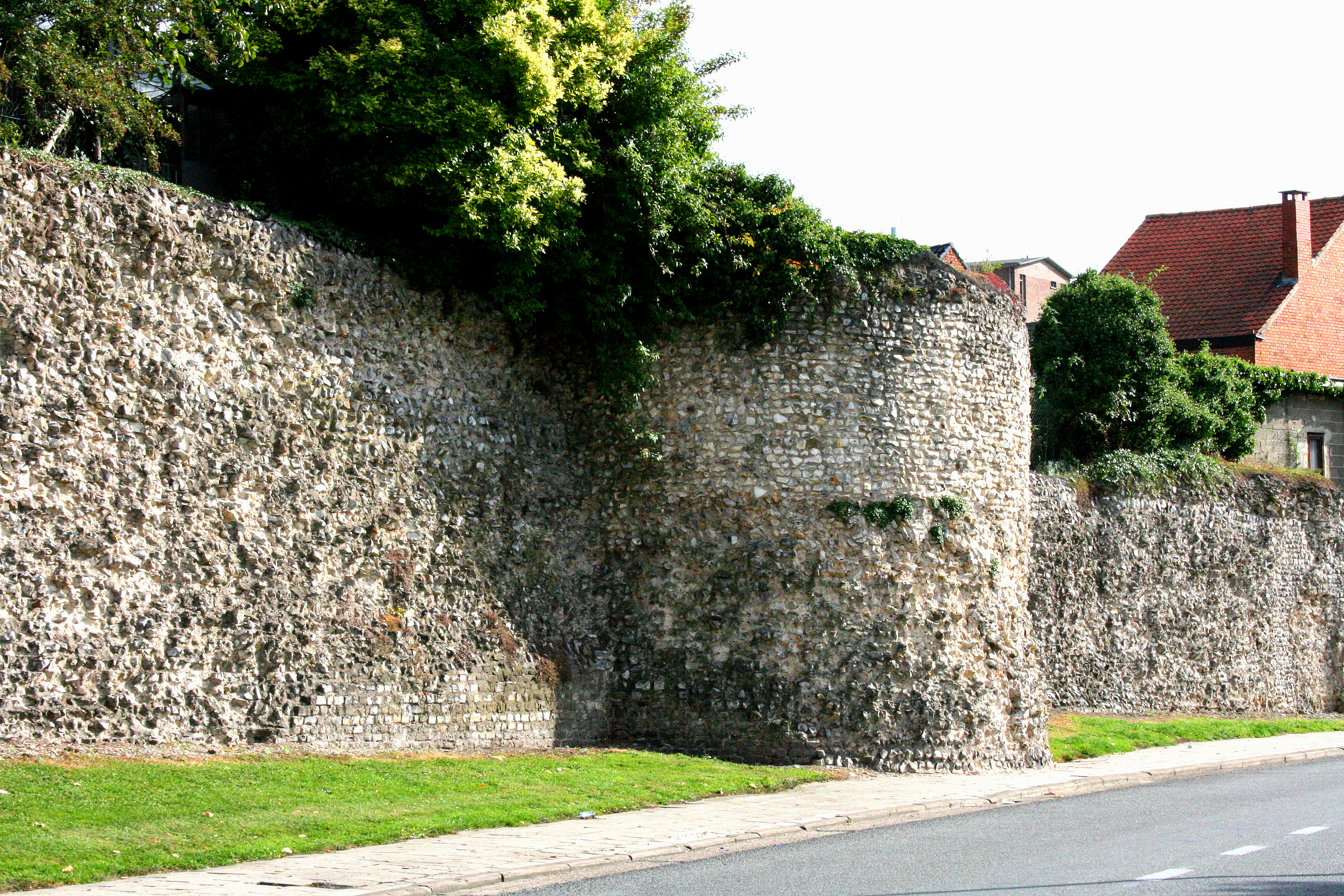
Part of the Roman city wall

Caesar referred to the fort of the Eburones as Aduatuca, and this has led to a widely accepted proposal that this can be equated to Tongeren. There are counter arguments that the word "Aduatuca" was probably a general word for a fort in this region, meaning that there might have been more places with the same name, and that Tongeren shows no signs of pre-Roman occupation, nor the hilly terrain described by Caesar. There was also a distinct tribe in the area known as the Aduatuci. On the other hand, it has the same name and function as a local capital, and is in generally the right area. If it is not Tongeren itself, the Aduatuca of the Eburones might be the ancient fortification of Caestert in nearby Riemst.

During Julius Caesar’s campaigns in this part of Gaul in the first century BC, the Belgae revolted against the campaign of Caesar, led by the Eburones. They destroyed a legion that had demanded the right to winter among them in 54 BC. Caesar reported that he sold the Aduatuci into slavery, and annihilated the name of the Eburones, many of whom however he reported having fled successfully, including Ambiorix the leader of the revolt. Instead of risking Roman lives to pursue them he invited tribes from over the Rhine, such as the Sigambri to come and plunder. This back-fired when Eburones pointed out to the Sigambri that the Romans had all the booty at Aduatuca, and were the more attractive target.

The Tungri, not mentioned by Caesar, came to dominate this area in the Roman era, and are the reason for the name of the modern name Tongeren. Tacitus says that Tungri was a new name for the original tribes who had previously been called the Germani. But many modern writers believe that the Gallo-Roman population of the area contained a significant amount of more recent Germanic immigrants from across the Rhine. Located on the important road linking Cologne to Bavay via the relay of Liberchies, and surrounded by the fertile lands of the Hesbaye region, Roman Tongeren quickly became one of the largest Gallo-Roman administrative and military towns in the first century. It suffered from a destructive fire during the Batavian siege in 70 AD, which was part of the Batavian revolt. In the second century, it erected a defensive wall, portions of which can still be seen today. Typical Roman buildings were built in town, while villas and mound graves (tumuli) dotted the surrounding area.

In 358 the future emperor Julian met, in Tongeren, a delegation of Salian Franks who had recently settled in Toxandria (the modern Campine region), to the north of Tongeren. They wanted peace but spoke "as if the ground they had seized were rightfully their own". Julian gave ambiguous replies and then after the meetings sent a surprise attack along the Maas or Meuse river, and "they met him with entreaties rather than with resistance, he received the submission of them and their children". They became increasingly important after this time. Zosimus reports that Julian used them as part of his forces in fights against other Germanic tribes.

=== Middle Ages ===
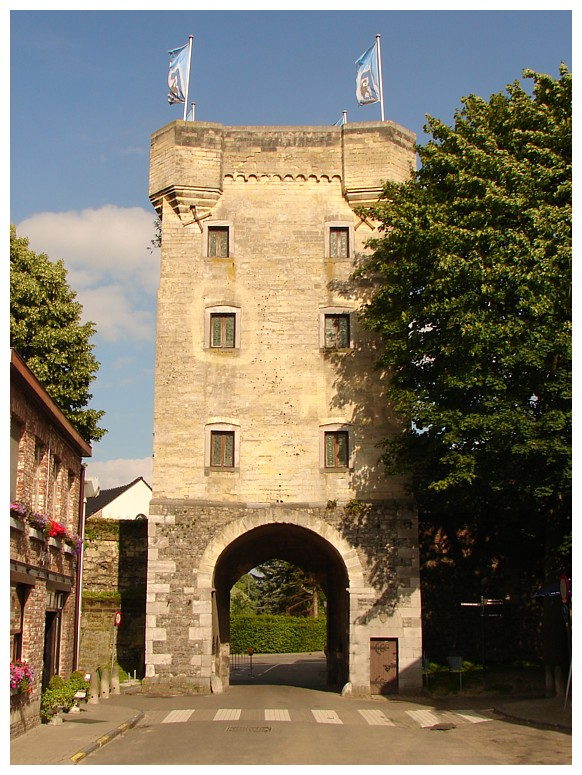
The Moeren Gate, a monumental gate in the medieval city wall

Already in the fourth century, just as the Salian Franks were settling to the north, the city became the center of a Christian diocese under the influence of Saint Servatius, bishop of Tongeren, who died in 384 AD. In the meantime, the Franks to the north and east were pagan and so many areas had to be reconverted over the course of the following centuries, with several missionaries becoming martyrs. The seat of the Tungrian bishopric however eventually moved to nearby Maastricht, after Saint Servatius was buried near the Roman town there. Much later, Liège became the seat of what would become the Roman Catholic Diocese of Liège, the church equivalent to the Civitas Tungrorum. This was the resting place of Saint Lambert of Maastricht, one of the last missionaries in the area, who died about 700 AD. Aduatuca Tungrorum may have been destroyed by the Huns in 451 AD. Tongeren therefore lost some importance during this period.

Significant waves of Germanic settlers and invaders changed the area. The Merovingian period between the fifth and the eighth century is not well documented. The building of a new church and the foundation of a chapter of canons took place in Carolingian times, at the very place where the old bishops’ houses stood, and where the basilica still stands today. The construction of the current basilica started at the beginning of the thirteenth century in the prevalent Gothic style of that period. Other buildings were added to the religious core of the city, including new commercial areas, hospitals and artisans quarters. The thirteenth century also saw the building of the medieval defensive wall, several new churches and cloisters, and the beguinage. The city became one of the “bonnes villes” ("good cities") of the Prince-Bishopric of Liège.

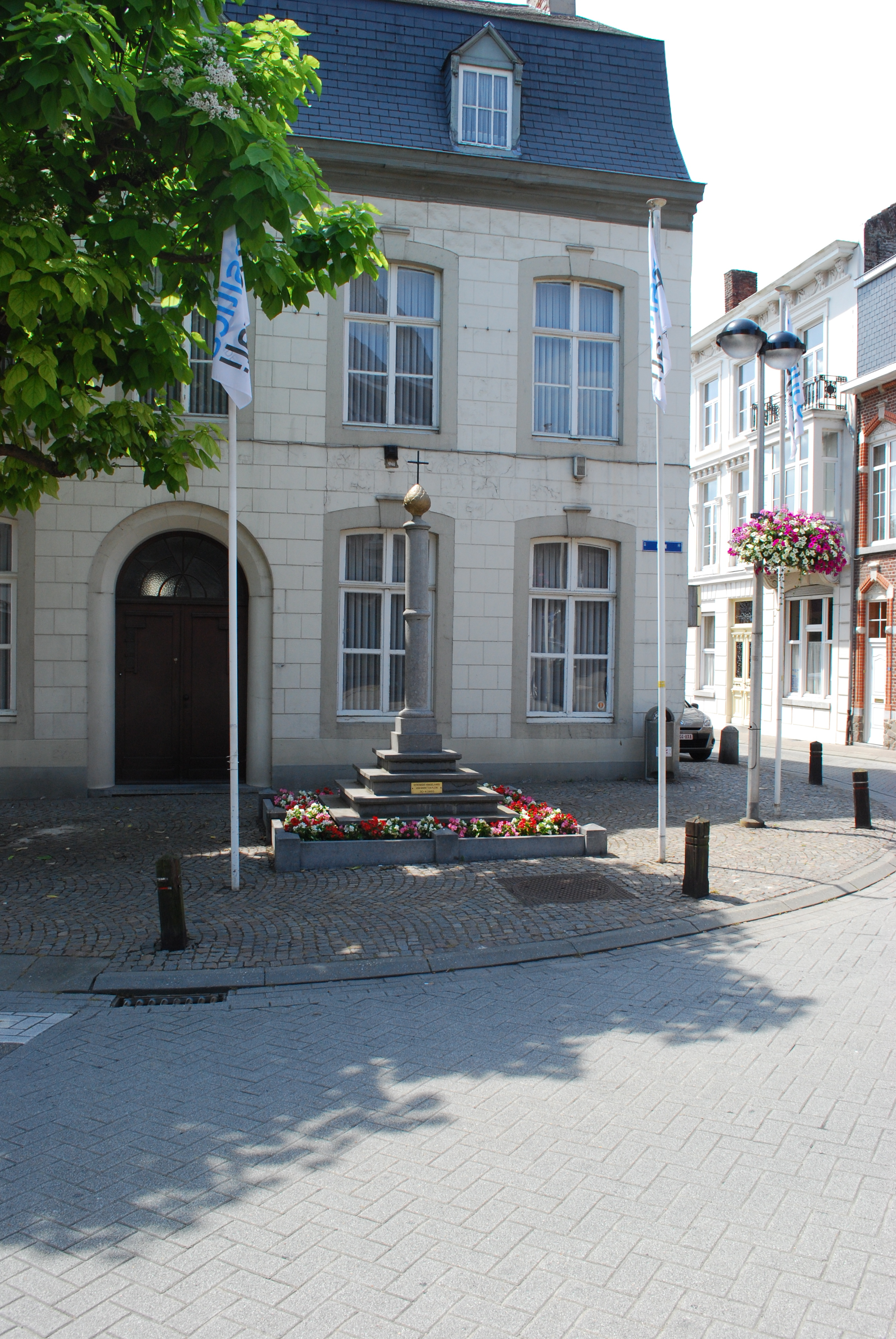
Het Plein ("The Square") with a "Perron", the historic symbol of being one of the "Good Cities".

=== From seventeenth century until contemporary age ===
In 1677, the city was burned almost entirely by Louis XIV’s troops, a catastrophe from which Tongeren never completely recovered. The rebirth of the city dates from after 1830.

In 1815 the city became part of the Kingdom of the Netherlands and in 1830 Tongeren finally became a Belgian city. When Limburg was split in 1839, Tongeren became the main town of a judicial and administrative district .

In 1914, the First World War broke out and on 9 August 1914, the city was occupied by German troops. The consequences of this war were limited to material damage to ten houses and twelve civilian casualties. On 24 November 1918, Tongeren was liberated by Belgian troops.

On 10 May 1940, at the start of World War II, the station and surrounding neighbourhoods were bombed by German aircraft and live ammunition was fired at a full shuttle train to Liège. On 8 September 1944, the Allies reached the city and Tongeren was liberated. In the aftermath of the occupation, several V-bombs fell around Tongeren in December 1944.

In 1977 the neighbouring municipalities of Berg, Diets-Heur, Henis, 's-Herenelderen, Koninksem, Lauw, Mal, Neerrepen, Nerem, Overrepen, Piringen, Riksingen, Rutten, Sluizen, Vreren and Widooie merged into Tongeren.

Tongeren is currently the judicial capital of the province of Belgian Limburg.

== Main sights ==
- The Béguinage, founded in 1257, has been listed as a UNESCO World Heritage Site since 1998. Its enclosure wall was destroyed in the 19th century: it separated the beguinage from the rest of the city and thus guaranteed peace and quiet for the small religion-inspired community. In the 17th century, the beguinage counted some 300 beguines; it was also able to survive the 1677 fire that destroyed most of the city.
- The Basilica of Our Lady (Onze-Lieve-Vrouwe Basiliek), built in Gothic style in the 13th century, where recent excavations have produced some of the richest archaeological finds in Flanders. Archaeological excavations have proven the presence of an edifice here starting from the 4th century, while a Carolingian prayer house existed here in the 9th century. The building of the choir of the present basilica began in 1240. Nave, transepts and side chapels were added between the 13th and 15th century. The original Romanesque tower was replaced by the present, 64-metre-tall (210-foot) Gothic tower from 1442 until 1541. The basilica's interior is home to the statue of Our Lady of Tongeren, erected in 1475. The treasury is housed in the former hall of the Chapter and comprises one of the richest collections of religious art in Belgium. The bell tower was inscribed on the UNESCO World Heritage List as part of the Belfries of Belgium and France site in 1999.
- Church of St. Catherine, built in Gothic style in 1294, but modified later in different styles. Works of art include the 1711 pulpit by Robrecht Verburgh, the main altarpiece by Gaspar de Crayer (17th century) and a sculpture of the Suffering Christ, donated by the beguine Anna de Floz.
- The Gallo-Roman Museum, which houses Celtic gold, Roman glassware, Merovingian filigree work, and a Roman dodecahedron, an unusual Gallo-Roman object found during excavations
- The original Roman wall, dating from the second century, still visible for more than 1,500 metres (4,900 feet).
- Some of the medieval defensive towers, also still visible today.
- Statue of Ambiorix, erected in 1866.
- Several Tumuli are found around the city.
- The Pliniuspark features the Plinius spring, a natural spring described by Pliny the Elder in 77-79 a.d.
- At the location of a former Roman temple in the Keverstraat, a modern representation of that temple can be found. Because no drawings, apart from the floor plans, of the original temple exist, everything has been rebuilt up to 1 metre (3 ft 3 in) high.
- Partly 3 metres (9.8 ft) below the Basilica of Our Lady and partly inside the Basilica, the Teseum-museum shows the archaeological findings at the location of the Basilica, as well as exhibitions about the history of the church.
- Tongeren houses a youth detention center.
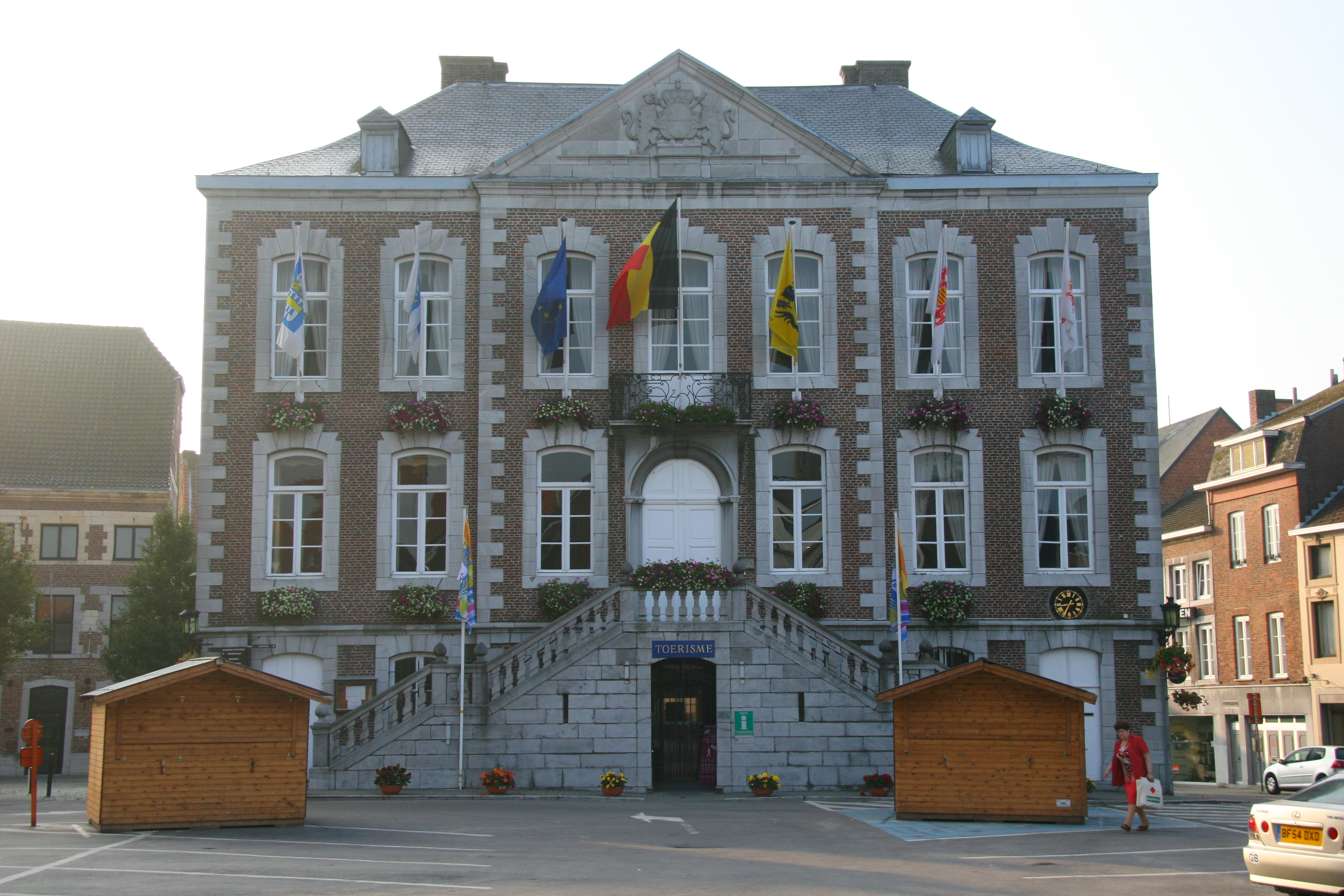
Tongeren City Hall

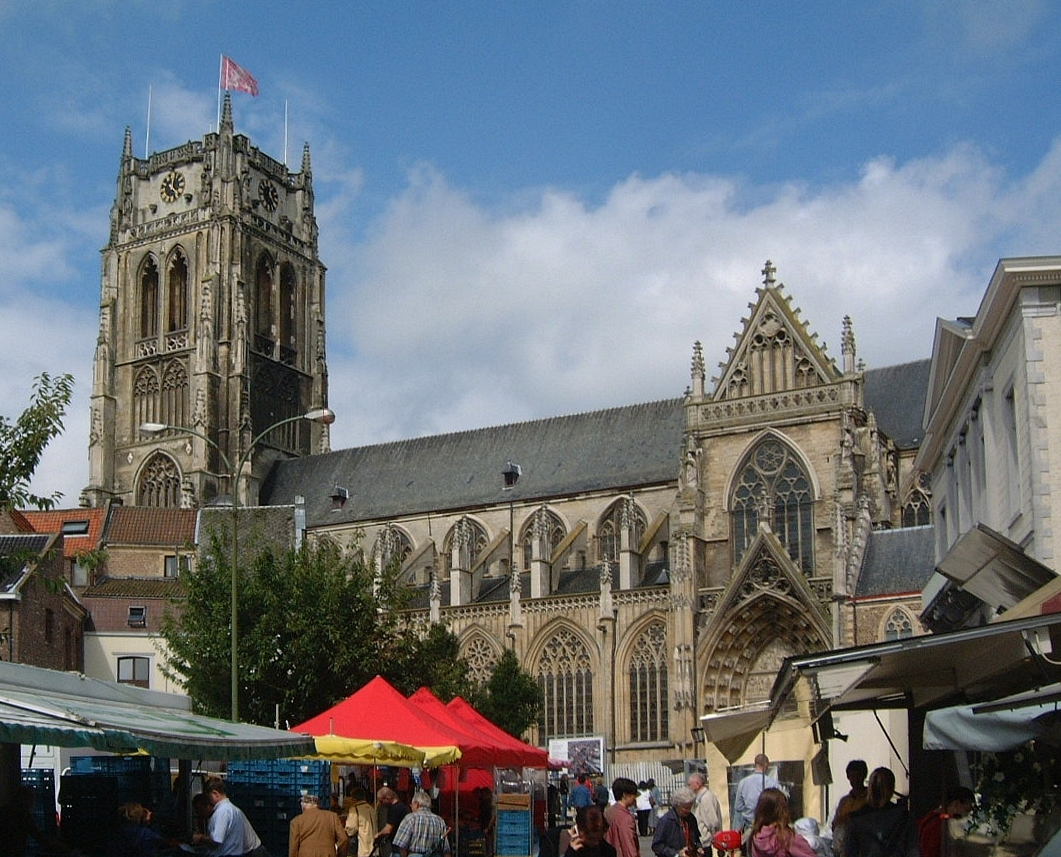
The Basilica of Our Lady

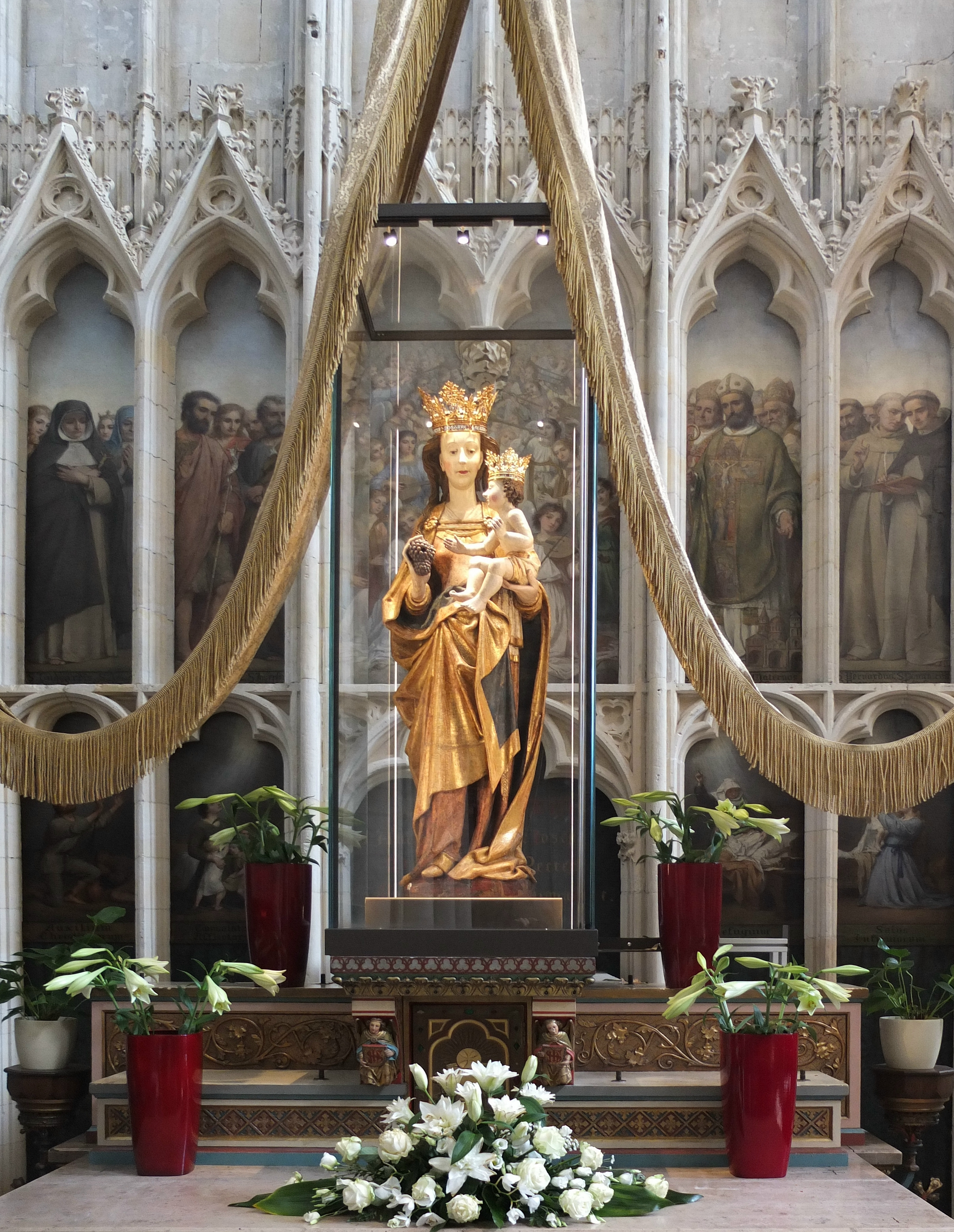
Statue of Our Lady Cause of our Joy

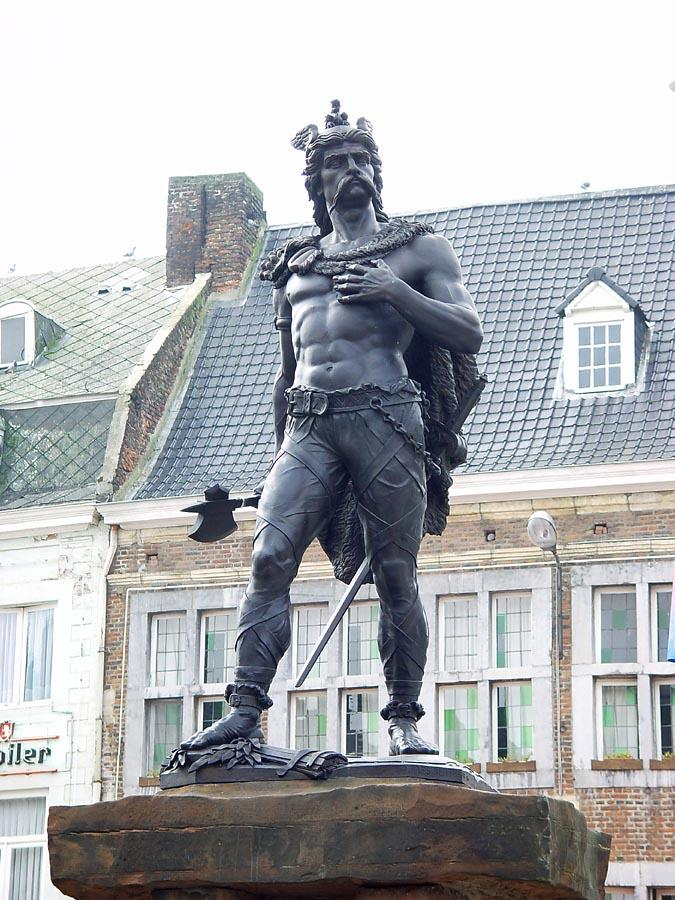
Statue of Ambiorix on the Grote Markt

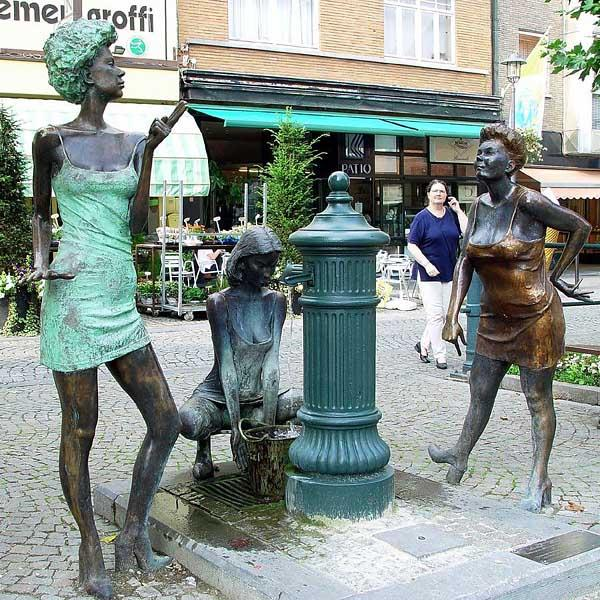
Modern art in Tongeren: Púmpkëskal ("Pump-chat")

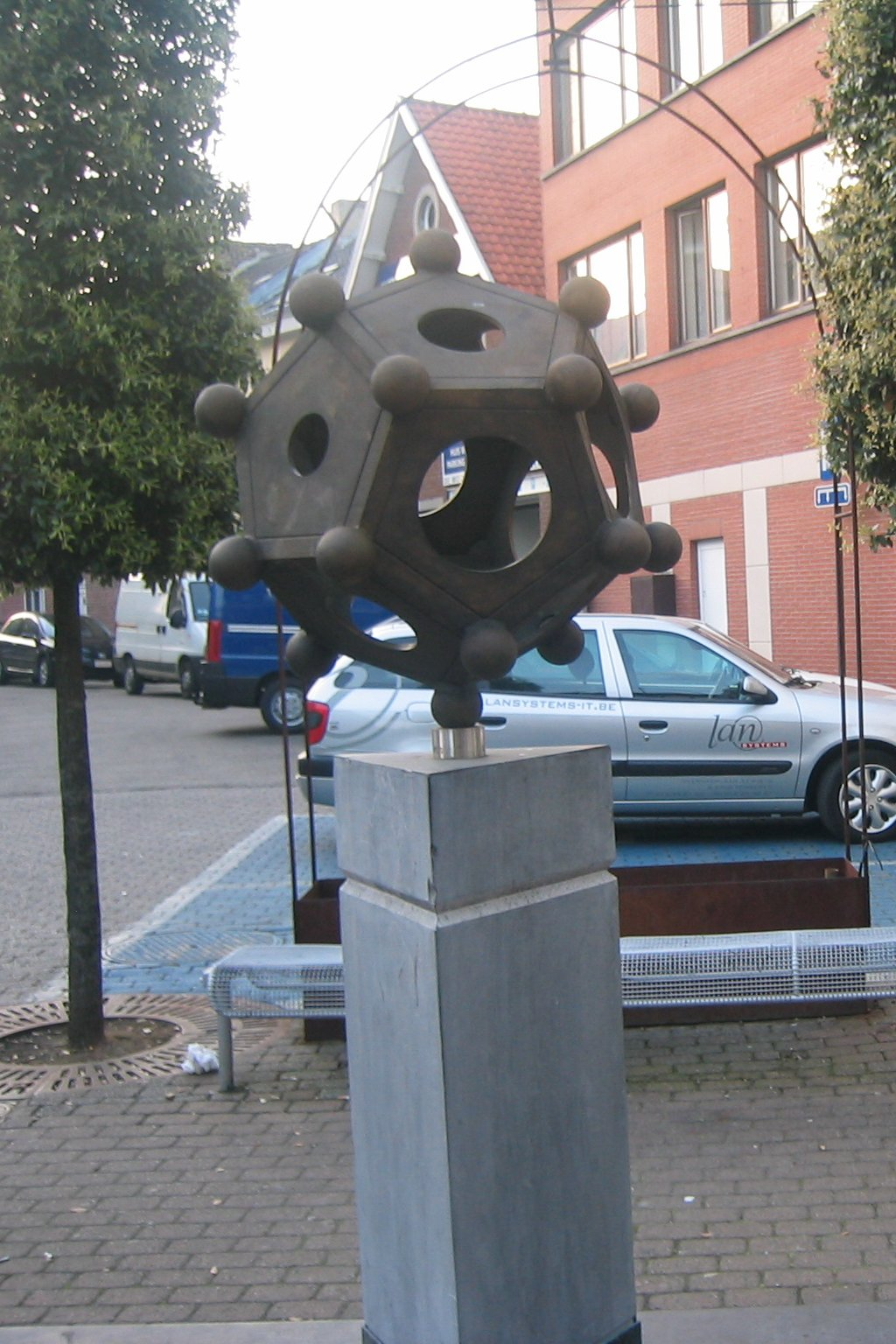
The Dodecahedron

== Events ==
- The Kroningsfeesten (“Coronation Celebrations”) are organized every seven years in commemoration of the crowning of the miraculous statue of the Blessed Virgin Mary by Bishop Doutreloux in 1890. This religious procession, the largest and one of the most impressive in Belgium, took place for the seventeenth time in 2009. The eighteenth edition took place in July 2016.
- A well-attended antiques fair takes place every Sunday. It is the largest of its kind in the Benelux.

== Sports ==
- Women's volleyball club Datovoc Tongeren plays at the highest level of the Belgian league pyramid.
- Tongeren's best known football club is KSK Tongeren.

== Famous inhabitants ==
Ancient times

- Ambiorix, prince of the Eburones and rebel leader against the Roman invaders. Although his statue stands on the central square of Tongeren, it is unknown where he lived exactly and Julius Caesar's Commentarii de Bello Gallico is the only source to mention him (1st century BC)
- Saint Servatius, bishop of Tongeren, introduced Christianity in the Netherlands (4th century)
- Saint Helier, ascetic hermit and patron saint of Jersey (6th century)
- Radulph of Rivo, historian and liturgist (d. 1403)

Modern times

- Honoré Gabriel Riqueti, comte de Mirabeau, French politician (1749–1791)
- Valentinus Paquay, Roman Catholic beatified priest, also known as "het heilig Paterke van Hasselt" (the holy priest [diminutive] of Hasselt) (1828–1905)
- Philippe Boesmans, composer (b. 1936)
- Robert Cailliau, co-inventor of the World Wide Web, together with Tim Berners-Lee (b. 1947)
- Gaëtan Coucke, football player (b. 1998)
- Cyriel Dessers, football player (b. 1994)
- Patrick Dewael, politician, former Minister President of Flanders, and mayor (b. 1955)
- Wilfried Nelissen (1970), Road racing cyclist
- Jef Vliers, football player and coach (1932 – 1994)
- Zoon van snooK, songwriter/musician (b. 1978)
- Freddy Loix, rally driver (b. 1970)
