= Bundesrat =

Bundesrat is a German word that means federal council and may refer to:

- Federal Council (Austria)
- German Bundesrat
- Federal Council (Switzerland)
- Bundesrat (German Empire)

== See also ==
- Federal Council (disambiguation)
