= Basilica of Our Lady, Tongeren =

Basilica of Our Lady
- Dutch: Onze-Lieve-Vrouwe Basiliek; French: Basilique de Notre-Dame
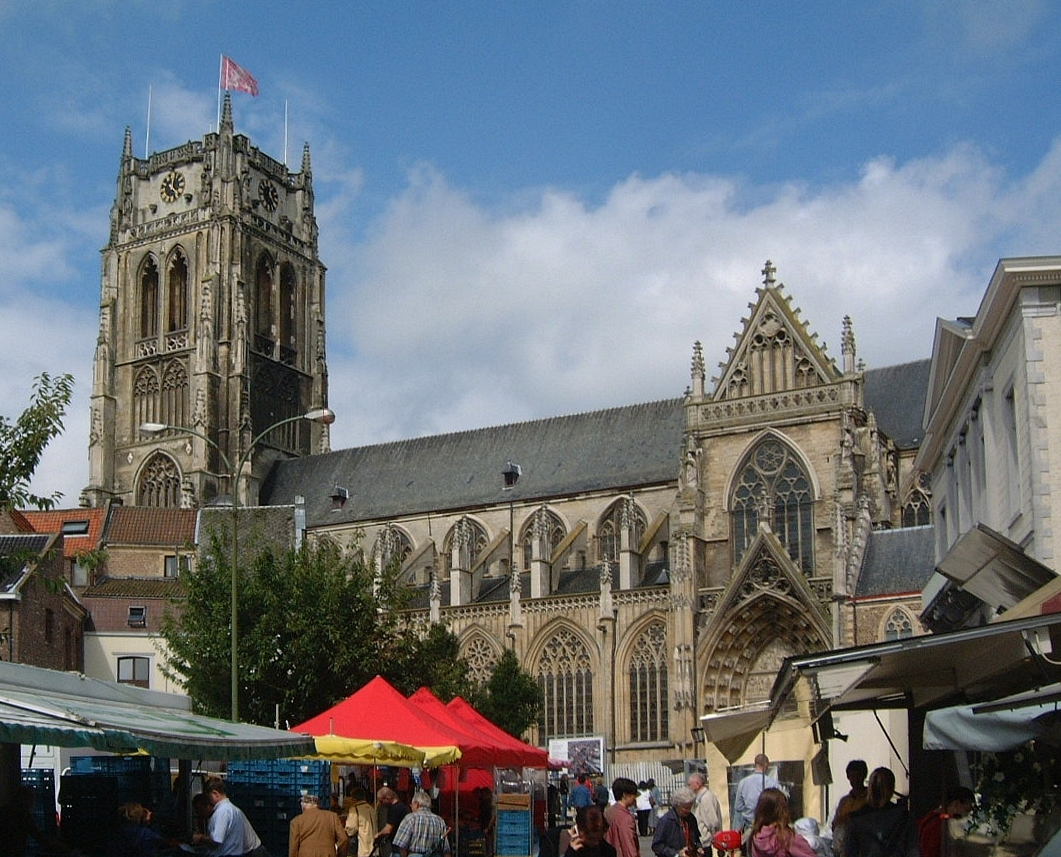

- Location in Belgium
- 50.7808°N 5.4646°E
- Location: Tongeren
- Country: Belgium
- Denomination: Roman Catholic Church

The Basilica of Our Lady (Dutch: Onze-Lieve-Vrouwe Basiliek, French: Basilique de Notre-Dame), also called Old Cathedral of Tongeren, is the main place of Catholic worship in Tongeren, Belgium, and the former cathedral of the suppressed diocese of Tongeren.

== History ==
Archaeological excavations found some of the richest archaeological finds of Flanders, including wooden houses from the 1st century. The excavations have also shown the presence of a construction area already present in the 4th century and a Merovingian church predating a Carolingian house of prayer from the 9th century.

The construction of the present church choir began in 1240. The basilica was built in the Gothic style, according to the local interpretation of the Brabantine Gothic, in the 13th century. The nave, transept and side chapels were added between the 13th and 15th centuries.

The original Romanesque bell tower was replaced by the current Gothic tower, measuring 64 meters high, built between 1442 and 1541.

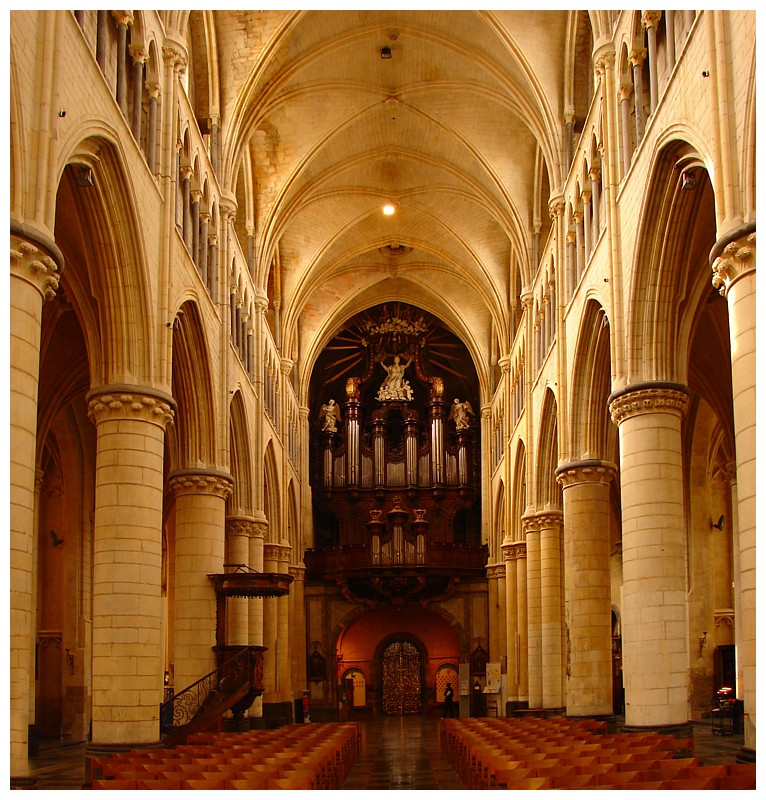
Internal view

The interior of the basilica houses the image of Our Lady of Tongeren, dating from 1475. The treasure is in the old chapter and includes one of the richest collections of Catholic religious art in Belgium.

In 1931, the church was raised to the rank of basilica.

In 1999, the belfry of the basilica was inscribed on the UNESCO World Heritage List as a part of the Belfries of Belgium and France site, as testimony to its importance in civic (rather than religious) functions (like its role as a watch-tower) and its Gothic architecture.

== See also ==
- Roman Catholicism in Belgium
