= Missa Pange lingua =

1515 musical setting by Josquin des Prez

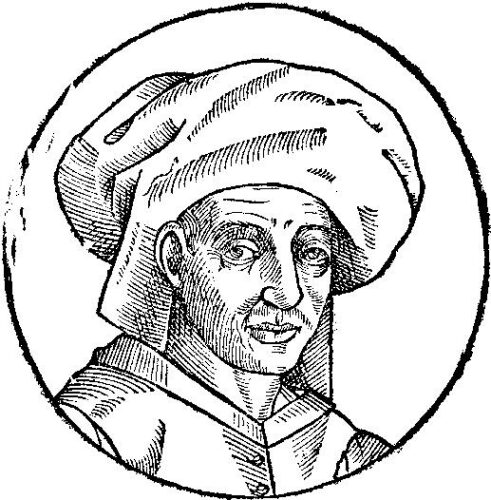
A 1611 woodcut of Josquin des Prez

The Missa Pange lingua is a musical setting of the Ordinary of the Mass by Franco-Flemish composer Josquin des Prez, probably dating from around 1515, near the end of his life. Most likely his last mass, it is an extended fantasia on the Pange Lingua hymn, and is one of Josquin's most famous mass settings.

== Background ==
The Missa Pange lingua is considered to be Josquin's last mass. It was not available to Ottaviano Petrucci for his 1514 collection of Josquin's masses, the third and last of the set; additionally, the mass contains references to other late works such as the Missa de Beata Virgine and the Missa Sine nomine. It was not formally published until 1539 by Hans Ott in Nuremberg, although manuscript sources dating from Josquin's lifetime contain the work. Famous copyist Pierre Alamire included it at the beginning of one of his two compilations of masses by Josquin.

== Style ==
The hymn on which the mass is based is the famous Pange Lingua Gloriosi, by Thomas Aquinas, which is used for the Vespers of Corpus Christi, and which is also sung during the veneration of the Blessed Sacrament. The mass is the last of only four that Josquin based on plainsong (the others are the Missa Gaudeamus, a relatively early work, the Missa Ave maris stella, and the Missa de Beata Virgine; all of them involve, in some way, praise of the Virgin Mary). The hymn, in the Phrygian mode, is in six musical phrases, of 10, 10, 8, 8, 8, and 9 notes respectively, corresponding to the six lines of the hymn. The work is tightly organized, with almost all of the melodic material drawn from the source hymn, and from a few subsidiary motifs which appear near the beginning of the mass. As such, the Missa Pange lingua is considered to be one of the finest examples of a paraphrase mass.

Like most musical settings of the mass Ordinary, it is in six parts:

1. Kyrie
2. Gloria
3. Credo
4. Sanctus
5. Benedictus
6. Agnus Dei

Most of the movements begin with literal quotations from the Pange lingua hymn, but the entire tune does not appear until near the end, in the last section of the Agnus Dei, when the superius (the highest voice) sings it in its entirety, in long notes, as though Josquin were switching back to the cantus-firmus style of the middle 15th century. The 1539 publisher even added the hymn's text under the notes at this point.

Josquin uses imitation frequently in the mass, and also pairs voices; indeed there are many passages with only two voices singing, providing contrast to the fuller textures surrounding them. While the movements begin with quotations from the original, as the movements progress Josquin treats the Pange lingua tune so freely that only hints of it are heard. Several passages in homophony are striking, and no more so than the setting of "et incarnatus est" in the Credo: here the text, "...he became incarnate by the Holy Ghost from the Virgin Mary..." is set to the complete melody from the original hymn which contains the words "Sing, O my tongue, of the mystery of the divine body."

Rather than being a summation of his previous techniques, as can be seen in the last works of Guillaume Dufay, Josquin's mass synthesizes several contrapuntal trends from the late 15th and early 16th centuries into a new kind of style, one which was to become the predominant compositional manner of the Franco-Flemish composers in the first half of the 16th century.

== Influence ==
Building on Josquin's fugal treatment of the Pange Lingua hymn's third line in the Kyrie of the Missa Pange Lingua, the "Do-Re-Fa-Mi-Re-Do"-theme became one of the most famous in music history. Simon Lohet, Michelangelo Rossi, François Roberday, Johann Caspar Ferdinand Fischer, Johann Jakob Froberger, Johann Caspar Kerll, Johann Sebastian Bach, and Johann Fux wrote fugues on it, and the latter's extensive elaborations in the Gradus ad Parnassum made it known to every aspiring composer—among them Wolfgang Amadeus Mozart, who used its first four notes as the fugal subject for the last movement of his Symphony No. 41, the Jupiter Symphony.
