= Estienne Grossin =

Medieval and Renaissance composer

Estienne Grossin (fl. 1418–1421; also Grossim) was a French composer of the late medieval and early Renaissance eras, active in Paris. He was one of the first composers to write a partially cyclic mass, a form which was to become the predominant large-scale vehicle for musical expression later in the 15th century.

== Life ==
He was originally from the diocese of Sens. Only two records survive of his life, a mention in 1418 that he was a chaplain at the Parisian church of St. Merri, and the inclusion of his name as a clerk at Notre Dame in Paris. This source also gives his origin and mentions that he was a priest, but gives no date of birth. Stylistically, most of his music seems to have been written before about 1430.

== Music and influence ==
While he wrote both sacred and secular music, the sacred music predominates. Most significant among these compositions is a four-movement setting of the Ordinary of the Mass, including the Kyrie, Gloria, Credo, and Sanctus (there is no Agnus Dei in this particular set; it may have been lost). The movements are unified by a motto marked as trumpetta, although it is unclear whether this was an expression marking or an actual indication for performance on a trumpet. Unification of a mass by cantus firmus writing was not to occur for another decade at least, most likely in England: Grossin was one of the first, after Johannes Ciconia, to sense the need for musical unity in the several movements and accomplish it by use of a type of motto theme.

Grossin also wrote single movements of masses, almost all for three voices (although one Agnus setting survives for four). One of his motets, Imera dat hodierno, was popular enough to be copied in at least six surviving sources. He also wrote two French chansons which have survived, one of which is a rondeau.

Some of his music survives in the Trent Codices, the largest source of music from the 15th century in Europe.
