= Paraphrase mass =

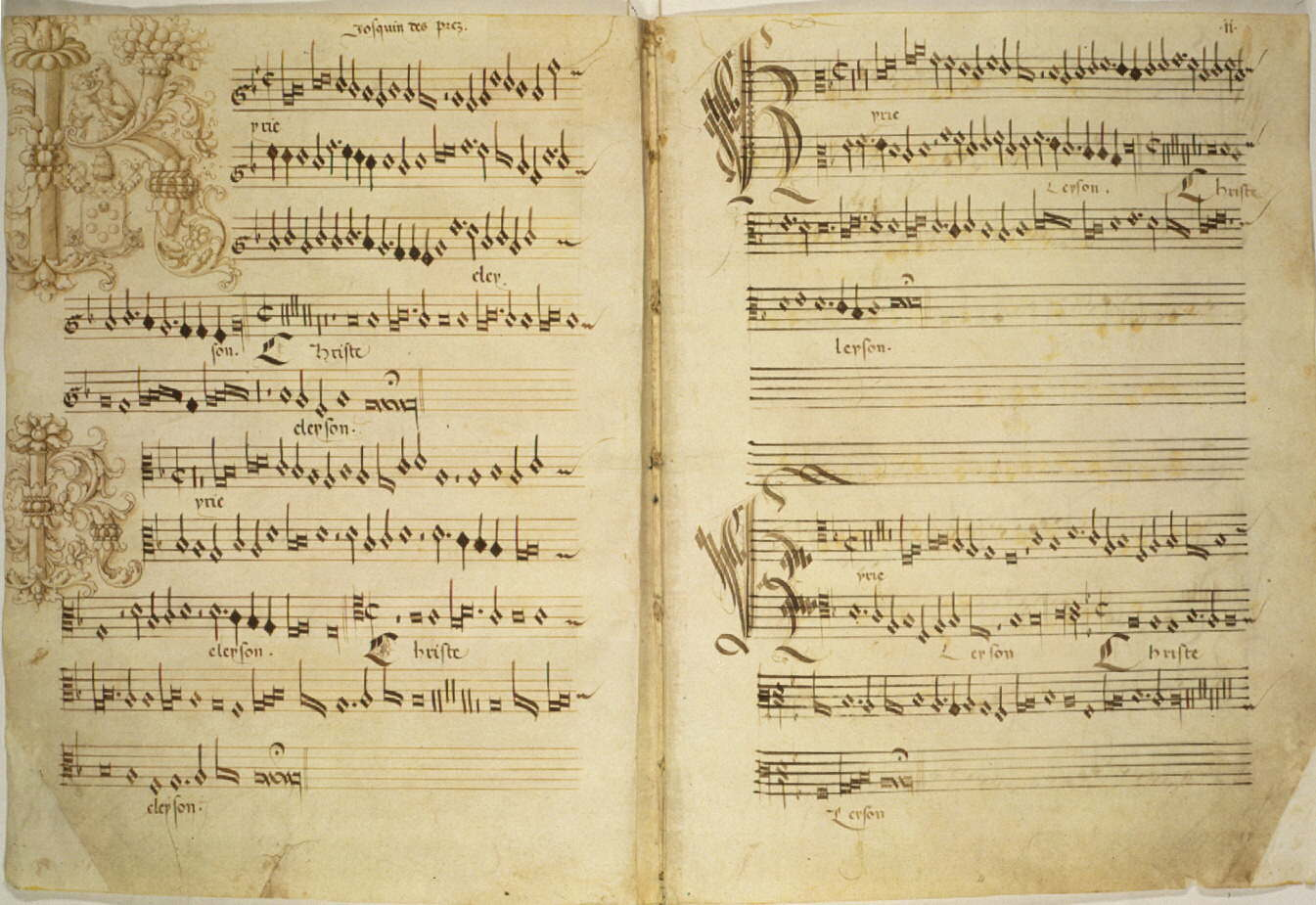
Manuscript showing the opening Kyrie of the Missa de Beata Virgine, a late work by Josquin des Prez, and a paraphrase mass. Each of the voices sings a version of the source plainchant, elaborated or "paraphrased".

A paraphrase mass is a musical setting of the Ordinary of the Mass that uses as its basis an elaborated version of a cantus firmus, typically chosen from plainsong or some other sacred source. It was a common means of mass composition from the late 15th century until the end of the 16th century, during the Renaissance period in music history, and was most frequently used by composers in the parts of western Europe which remained under the direct control of the Roman Catholic Church. It is distinguished from the other types of mass composition, including cyclic mass, parody, canon, soggetto cavato, free composition, and mixtures of these techniques.

== History ==
Musical paraphrase, in general, had been used for a long time before it was first applied to the music of the Ordinary of the Mass. It was common in the early and middle 15th century for a work such as a motet to use an embellished plainchant melody as its source, with the melody usually in the topmost voice. John Dunstable's Gloria is an example of this procedure, as are the two settings by Guillaume Dufay of the Marian Antiphon Alma redemptoris mater. Many compositions in fauxbourdon, a characteristic technique of the Burgundian School, use a paraphrased version of a plainchant tune in the highest voice. In these cases the source would not be obscured by the paraphrase; it was still easily recognizable through whatever ornamentation was applied.

Dufay was probably one of the first to use paraphrase technique in the mass. His Missa Ave regina celorum (written between 1463 and 1474) is similar to a cantus firmus mass in that the tune is in the tenor; however, it is paraphrased by elaboration (and he also includes bits of his own motet on that antiphon, foreshadowing the parody technique). By the 1470s or 1480s, the first masses appear that use paraphrase in more than one voice: two examples survive by Johannes Martini, the Missa domenicalis and the Missa ferialis.

By the beginning of the 16th century, it was becoming more common to use the paraphrased tune in all voices of a polyphonic texture. The most famous example from the early 16th century, and one of the most famous paraphrase masses ever composed, was the Missa pange lingua by Josquin des Prez, which is an extended fantasia on the Pange Lingua hymn for Corpus Christi by Thomas Aquinas. This mass was probably composed near the end of Josquin's life, around 1520. In the Missa pange lingua, all voices carry variants of the hymn, with the beginnings of successive phrases marking points of imitation in the mass. All voices are given equal weight, and the score achieves a motivic unity which was a significant change from previous practice.

Another composer of Josquin's generation who was important in the development of the paraphrase mass was Pierre de La Rue. Like Josquin, he began with the cantus firmus technique, and continued to use it for most of his life; but he began to elaborate the source material, eventually integrating it into multiple voices of a polyphonic texture where all the voices had equal weight.

Later in the 16th century, paraphrase remained a common technique for construction of masses, although it was employed far less frequently than was parody technique. Palestrina used paraphrase technique in 31 of his masses, second only to parody, which he used in 51. Most of his masses based on hymns are paraphrase masses. In these works, the source hymns are often presented in a condensed form. When the Council of Trent prohibited the use of secular songs as sources for masses in 1562, a large corpus of music was no longer available to composers who had been ransacking it for parodies; those composers who followed the Council's dictates often returned to using monophonic hymns and plainsong, sources which suggested the paraphrase technique. Indeed, during this period, it was the favored method of using Gregorian chants to construct masses.

Paraphrase masses were written relatively infrequently in England and Germany, especially after the Protestant Reformation. Composers of masses in those regions developed styles independently, and in both areas tended to use variations of the cantus firmus technique.
