= Pange lingua gloriosi corporis mysterium =

13th-century hymn written by Saint Thomas Aquinas

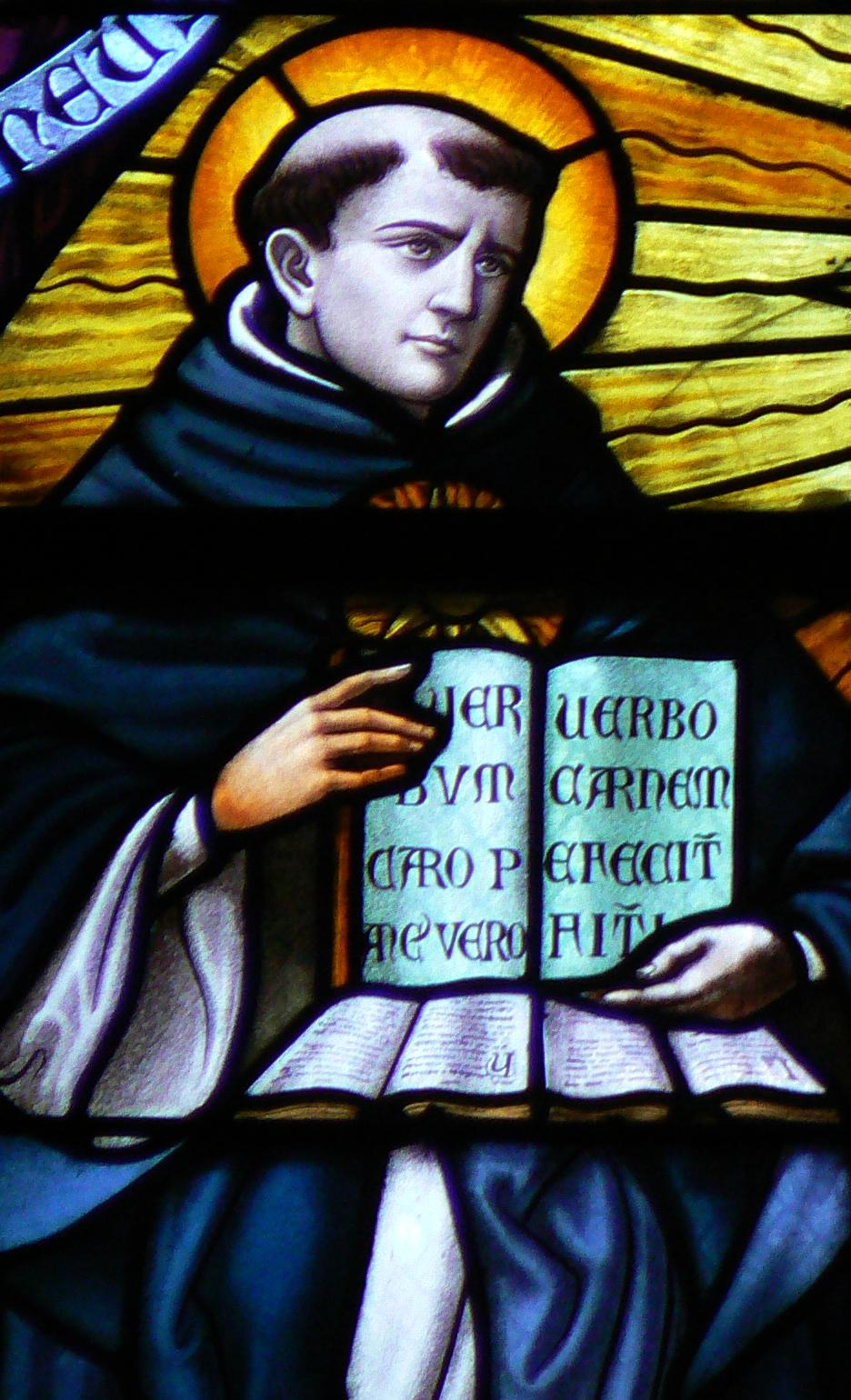
Thomas Aquinas is shown here holding a book with an excerpt from the Pange Lingua.

"Pange Lingua" (Ecclesiastical Latin: [ˈpandʒe ˈliŋɡwa ɡloriˈosi ˈkorporis miˈsteri.um]) is a Medieval Latin hymn attributed to Thomas Aquinas (1225–1274) for the Feast of Corpus Christi. It is also sung on Maundy Thursday during the procession from the church to the place where the Blessed Sacrament is kept until Good Friday.

The opening words recall another famous Latin sequence from which this hymn is derived: Pange lingua gloriosi proelium certaminis by Venantius Fortunatus. The last two stanzas (titled "Tantum ergo") are sung at Benediction of the Blessed Sacrament. The hymn expresses the doctrine that the bread and wine are changed into the body and blood of Christ during Mass. It is often sung in English as the hymn "Of the Glorious Body Telling" to the same tune as the Latin.

== Text ==
There are many English translations, of varying rhyme scheme and metre. The following has the Latin text with a doxology in the first column, and an English translation by Edward Caswall in the second. The third column is a more literal rendering.

Pange, lingua, gloriósi
Córporis mystérium,
Sanguinísque pretiósi,
Quem in mundi prétium
Fructus ventris generósi
Rex effúdit géntium.

Nobis datus, nobis natus
Ex intácta Vírgine,
Et in mundo conversátus,
Sparso verbi sémine,
Sui moras incolátus
Miro clausit órdine.

In suprémæ nocte coenæ
Recúmbens cum frátribus
Observáta lege plene
Cibis in legálibus,
Cibum turbæ duodénæ
Se dat suis mánibus.

Verbum caro, panem verum
Verbo carnem éfficit:
Fitque sanguis Christi merum,
Et si sensus déficit,
Ad firmándum cor sincérum
Sola fides súfficit.

Tantum ergo sacraméntum
Venerémur cérnui:
Et antíquum documéntum
Novo cedat rítui:
Præstet fides suppleméntum
Sénsuum deféctui.

Genitóri, Genitóque
Laus et jubilátio,
Salus, honor, virtus quoque
Sit et benedíctio:
Procedénti ab utróque
Compar sit laudátio.
Amen.

Sing, my tongue, the Saviour's glory,
Of His Flesh, the mystery sing;
Of the Blood, all price exceeding,
Shed by our Immortal King,
Destined, for the world's redemption,
From a noble Womb to spring.

Of a pure and spotless Virgin
Born for us on earth below,
He, as Man, with man conversing,
Stayed, the seeds of truth to sow;
Then He closed in solemn order
Wondrously His Life of woe.

On the night of that Last Supper,
Seated with His chosen band,
He, the Paschal Victim eating,
First fulfils the Law's command;
Then as Food to all his brethren
Gives Himself with His own Hand.

Word-made-Flesh, the bread of nature
By His Word to Flesh He turns;
Wine into His Blood He changes:
What though sense no change discerns.
Only be the heart in earnest,
Faith her lesson quickly learns.

Down in adoration falling,
Lo, the sacred Host we hail,
Lo, o'er ancient forms departing
Newer rites of grace prevail:
Faith for all defects supplying,
When the feeble senses fail.

To the Everlasting Father
And the Son who comes on high
With the Holy Ghost proceeding
Forth from each eternally,
Be salvation, honor, blessing,
Might and endless majesty.
Amen.

Tell, tongue, the mystery
of the glorious Body
and of the precious Blood,
which, for the price of the world,
the fruit of a noble Womb,
the King of the Nations poured forth.

Given to us, born for us,
from the untouched Virgin,
and dwelt in the world
after the seed of the Word had been scattered.
His inhabiting ended the delays
with wonderful order.

On the night of the Last Supper,
reclining with His brethren,
once the Law had been fully observed
with the prescribed foods,
as food to the crowd of Twelve
He gives Himself with His hands.

The Word as Flesh makes true bread
into flesh by a word
and the wine becomes the Blood of Christ.
And if sense is deficient
to strengthen a sincere heart
Faith alone suffices.

Therefore, the great Sacrament
let us reverence, prostrate:
and let the old Covenant
give way to a new rite.
Let faith stand forth as substitute
for defect of the senses.

To the Begetter and the Begotten
be praise and jubilation,
greeting, honour, strength also
and blessing.
To the One who proceeds from Both
be equal praise.
Amen.

== Music history ==
Pange lingua gloriosi corporis mysterium
Sung by Gareth Hughes. This is the plainchant version (Mode III) of Pange lingua sung to its traditional Latin text.

Pange lingua gloriosi corporis mysterium
instrumental only

There are two plainchant settings of the Pange lingua hymn. The better known is a Phrygian mode (Mode III) tune from the Roman liturgy, and the other is from the Mozarabic liturgy from Spain. The Roman tune was originally part of the Gallican Rite.

The Roman version of the Pange lingua hymn was the basis for a famous composition by Renaissance composer Josquin des Prez, the Missa Pange lingua. An elaborate fantasy on the hymn, the mass is one of the composer's last works and has been dated to the period from 1515 to 1521, since it was not included by Petrucci in his 1514 collection of Josquin's masses, and was published posthumously. In its simplification, motivic unity, and close attention to the text it has been compared to the late works of Beethoven, and many commentators consider it one of the high points of Renaissance polyphony.

Juan de Urrede, a Flemish composer active in Spain in the late fifteenth century, composed numerous settings of the Pange lingua, most of them based on the original Mozarabic melody. One of his versions for four voices is among the most popular pieces of the sixteenth century, and was the basis for dozens of keyboard works in addition to masses, many by Spanish composers.

Building on Josquin's treatment of the hymn's third line in the Kyrie of the Missa Pange Lingua, the "do–re–fa–mi–re–do"-theme (C–D–F–E–D–C) became one of the most famous in music history, used to this day in even non-religious works by composers including Simon Lohet, Michelangelo Rossi, François Roberday, Johann Caspar Ferdinand Fischer, Johann Jakob Froberger, Johann Caspar Kerll, Johann Sebastian Bach, Johann Fux wrote fugues on it, and the latter's extensive elaborations in the Gradus ad Parnassum made it known to every aspiring composer – among them Wolfgang Amadeus Mozart whose Jupiter theme borrows the first four notes. Anton Bruckner's first composition was a setting of the first strophe of the hymn: Pange lingua, WAB 31.

The last two verses of Pange lingua (Tantum ergo) are often separated out. They mark the end of the procession of the monstrance in Holy Thursday liturgy. Various separate musical settings have been written for this, including one by Giovanni Pierluigi da Palestrina, one by Franz Schubert, eight by Anton Bruckner, one by Maurice Duruflé, and one by Charles-Marie Widor. Beethoven wrote an organ reharmonization of Pange lingua. The work was discovered in October 2012 by the musicologist and professor of the University of Manchester Barry Cooper. It was immediately proposed that the piece served as a sketch for the composer's Missa solemnis.

Franz Liszt's "Night Procession" from Two Episodes from Lenau's Faust is largely a fantasy on the Pange lingua melody.

A setting of Pange lingua, written by Ciaran McLoughlin, appears on the Solas 1995 album Solas An Domhain.

Pange lingua has been translated into many different languages for worship throughout the world, yet the Latin version remains the most popular. The Syriac translation of "Pange lingua" was used as part of the rite of benediction in the Syro-Malabar Catholic Church of Kerala, India, until the 1970s.

== Indulgence ==
In the Roman Catholic Church, full recitation of the Pange Lingua, or the Tantum Ergo, is followed by the Latin traditional verses, connected to the indulgence in perpetuity:

V. Panem de coelo praestitísti eis.

R. Omnem delectaméntum in se habéntem.
Oration

Deus, qui nobis sub Sacraménto mirábili Passiónis tuae memóriam reliquísti, tríbue quaesumus, ita nos Córporis et Sanguinis tui sacra mystéria venerári, ut redemptiónis tuae fructum in nobis iúgiter sentiámus. Qui vivis et regnas cum Deo Patre, in unitate Spíritus Sancti Deus per ómnia saecula saeculórum. Amen.

— don Giuseppe Riva, Manuale di Filotea, 1860

Pius VII with Decree 25 August 1818 granted in perpetuity the indulgence of 300 days every time the Pange Lingua is recited, and 100 days only for those who recite the Tantum Ergo, always understanding that the aforementioned responsory is added Panem de coelo, etc. and the subsequent oration Deus qui nobis.
Whoever practices this devotion at least 10 times a month has a plenary indulgence once a year on a day of his choice, in addition to the plenary indulgence on Holy Thursday, in Corpus Christi, or on a day of the Octave. These indulgences are applicable [to the souls of] the deceased.

— G.Riva, Manuale di Filotea, 1860

== See also ==
- Trochaic septenarius
- Pater Noster

== Sources ==
- Fassler, Margot (2014). Frisch, Walter (ed.). Music in the Medieval West. Western Music in Context: A Norton History (1st ed.). New York: W. W. Norton & Company. ISBN 978-0-393-92915-7.
