= Trent Codices =

The Trent Codices are a collection of seven large music manuscripts compiled around the middle of the 15th century, currently kept in the northern Italian city of Trent. They contain mostly sacred vocal music composed between 1400 and 1475. Containing more than 1,500 separate musical compositions by 88 different named composers, as well as a huge amount of anonymous music (including the famous Missa Caput), they are the largest and most significant single manuscript source from the entire century from anywhere in Europe.

== Contents ==
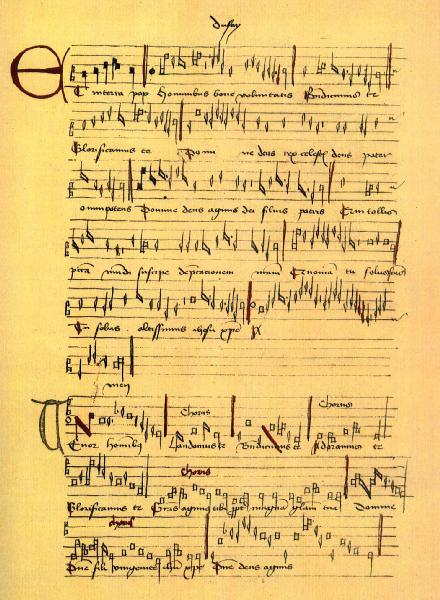
A Gloria by Guillaume Dufay, from the Trent Codices. The name of the composer is at the top in the center.

The Trent Codices consist of seven separate volumes. Six of these are held in the "Museo Provinciale d'Arte" within the Castello del Buonconsiglio and have the shelfmarks "Monumenti e Collezioni Provinciale, 1374–1379." However they are almost universally referred to by their older shelfmarks Trent 87-92. Thus the RISM sigla I-TRmn 87-92 or I-TRmp are often seen. A seventh manuscript was discovered in 1920 by Rudolf Ficker and is held at the Biblioteca Capitolare in Trent (see "History" below). Though technically it has the shelfmark "BL," it is almost universally called "Trent 93," continuing the series from the Castello.

The manuscripts were copied over a period of more than thirty years, from about 1435 to sometime after 1470. The names of two of the scribes have been preserved: Johannes Wiser and Johannes Lupi, both clerics connected with the cathedral in Trent. However, some of the work of copying, especially for the earliest portions of the set (Trent 87 and 92), was not done in Trent: a study of the watermarks and other features of the manuscripts has shown origins in Piedmont, northeastern France, and Savoy-Basel, as well as towns in northern Italy such as Bolzano.

Unusually for manuscripts of this era, the Trent Codices are small: at approximately 9 x 12 inches (20 x 30 cm) they are the equivalent of a 15th-century "miniature score". Since their small size and numerous errors would make singing from them difficult or impossible, they may have been used as a source from which performance copies were made. On the other hand, they are quite large enough to be sung from with one person on each part (which, it can be argued, was the norm for most of the 15th century). For some pieces, voice parts were even divided between two different gatherings ('booklets'), which would make possible a performance by two groups of singers.

The earliest "layer" of the manuscript set, included in Trent 87 and 92, contains single movements of the mass and motets, with works by such composers as Zacara da Teramo, Jacobus Vide, Johannes Brassart, and early works by Guillaume Dufay, whose music appears throughout the codices. There are also works by English composers, including John Dunstaple, giving some sense of the esteem in which English composers of the time were held. Most manuscript sources from the 15th century from England were destroyed by Henry VIII during the Dissolution of the Monasteries; the surviving music of 15th-century English composers comes largely from continental sources, such as these Italian books.

Copyist Johannes Wiser wrote out most of the five manuscripts Trent 88, 89, 90, 91, and 93, principally between 1445 and 1475. Not all of his copying was competent; he evidently possessed limited musical literacy, even though he held a post as an organist, since he left numerous mistakes. Much of the music he copied in these five books is by composers of the Burgundian School, including Dufay and Antoine Busnois, and there are a considerable number of unica (compositions which survive in a single source only) as well as pieces by composers whose names appear nowhere else (such as G. Dupoitt), and anonymous compositions. The Trent Codices are unusual for the time owing to the inclusion of composer attributions as often as they do; most music of the era is anonymous, since scribes typically left out the names of composers.

Parts of the Trent codices were written with a corrosive ink which has eaten through the paper causing, among other things, centers of noteheads to fall out. Though recently restored in 1975, the manuscripts are still in a precarious state, and for some pages earlier photographs are more legible than the manuscripts themselves.

== History ==
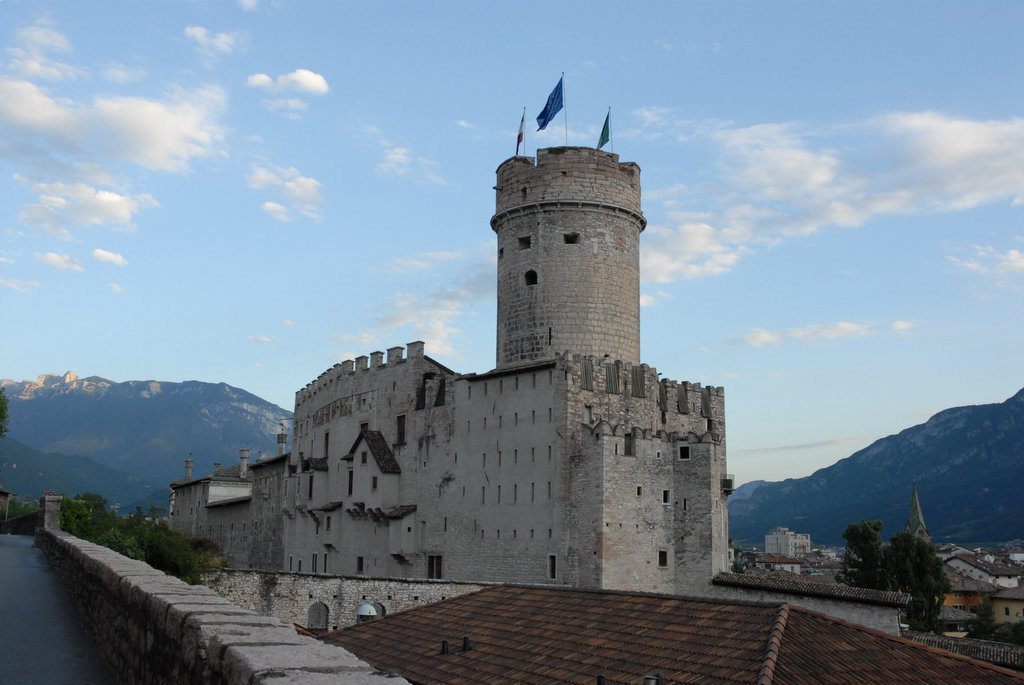
The Trent Codices are kept at the Castello del Buonconsiglio, in Trent, Italy.

During the 15th century, the area in which the music was copied was the southernmost part of the Holy Roman Empire, which during this era had an extensive musical establishment. Emperor Frederick III's cousin Sigismund, who was Duke of the Tyrol, had a large and sophisticated musical chapel at Innsbruck. The area around the Brenner Pass, including Innsbruck on the north and Trent on the south, was a crossroads through which many musicians traveling between Italy and the musically rich Low Countries would be expected to pass. It is reasonable to suppose that Trent, as a central location and a commercial center on a major trade and travel route, was a central musical repository as well. The Codices may have been the principal anthology of all the polyphonic music sung in all the chapels and courts in the Habsburg domains of northern Italy and southern Germany in the mid-15th century.

Six of the seven manuscripts, had been archived for centuries in the library at the Cathedral of Trent, and were not discovered until the middle of the 19th century. Their first discussion in the musicological literature was in 1885, by F. X. Haberl, in his huge monograph on Guillaume Dufay, Bausteine zur Musikgeschichte. Shortly after their discovery, the six codices were transferred to Vienna for study. By the terms of the Treaty of St. Germain at the end of World War I the Codices were to return to Trent. In 1920 they arrived, and in the same year the last of the seven manuscript books was found.

Publication of the contents of the manuscripts had already begun in Austria as part of the series Denkmäler der Tonkunst in Österreich (DTÖ). Though the first volume of Sechs Trienter Codices appeared in 1900, the last volume of the seven Trienter Codices was not published until 1970.

== Significance ==
The Trent Codices show the first interest in, and gradual development of the cyclic mass, the unified musical setting of the parts of the Ordinary of the Mass. The early volumes of the set contain isolate mass movements, as was characteristic of compositional practice at the end of the 14th century; next there are pairs of movements and parts of cycles; and in the later volumes, the Codices contain the earliest known three and four movement sets. All of the earliest unified sets are of English origin. The last volumes in the Codices include numerous mass cycles by the composers of the generation of Dufay, during which time the cantus firmus mass had become a mature form.

== Other music manuscripts in Trent ==
Although "Trent Codices" usually refers to these seven manuscripts alone, they are not the only testaments to active interest in late-Medieval and Renaissance music in Trent. At the back of a monophonic breviary (Biblioteca Comunale 1563, but permanently housed at the Museo Provinciale d'Arte) is a single folio, presumably from a much larger manuscript ca. 1400, containing a Credo by Antonio dictus Zachara da Teramo. Prayers dedicated to local saints were added to the manuscript sometime in the fifteenth century, establishing that the manuscript has been in Trent since at least the fifteenth century. Another fragment from the same period is found in incunabulum no. 60 at the Fondazione Biblioteca di S. Bernardino (formerly dei Padri Francescani). This source may be connected to the fragments at Padua. This library also houses a remarkable collection of so-called cantus fractus, or rhythmicized chant, which has recently been published.

Later polyphonic works are found in manuscripts at Trent's Archivio di Stato (Sezione tedesca no. 105) and Biblioteca Comunale (MSS. 283 an 1947/4, the latter including instrumental compositions) and among the donations of the musicologist Laurence Feininger at the Museo Provinciale d'Arte. The Feiniger collection also reflects his lifelong devotion to the collecting of later examples of liturgical chant, a collection which was also recently cataloged and published, in part, in facsimile.

== Publication of the Trent Codices ==
The series Denkmäler der Tonkunst in Österreich published in 1900, the seventh year of its existence, volumes 14 and 15 bound together, which contain the first of several selections from the Trent Codices. Further, the volumes contain a complete thematic catalogue of the first six Trienter Codices (87, 88, 89, 90, 91, and 92), as well as an index of text incipits.

Codices 87-92 were published in facsimile by Bibliopola (located in Rome) between 1969 and 1970.
