= Bartolomeo da Bologna =

Italian composer

Bartolomeo da Bologna (fl. 1405 – 1427) was an Italian composer of the transitional period between the late medieval style of the Trecento and the early Renaissance.

== Life ==
Little is known with certainty about his life, but he was probably from Bologna or nearby, and seems to have spent part of his life in Ferrara. He was a Benedictine, and may have been the prior of San Nicolò in Ferrara; in addition he was the organist there in 1407, and he is documented in that cathedral at the beginning of 1427. He also seems to have been connected with the chapel of John XXIII in Bologna, since one of his ballades (Arte psalentes) is probably addressed to the singers in his choir. (He is frequently referred to in manuscripts with the Latin form of his name, "Bartolomeus de Bononia")

== Music ==
Bartolomeo is one of only a few native Italian composers of the early 15th century of whom works have survived with reliable attribution; many of the musicians in Italy during the 15th century were foreigners, and it was not until later in the century that there were as many Italians as there were émigrés from northern Europe composing music there. Seven pieces by Bartolomeo have survived, all for three voices: two mass movements, and five secular songs, including a ballade, two ballatas, a rondeau and a virelai. Stylistically all are related to the ars subtilior which flourished in Avignon, Bologna and other regions held by the antipopes during the Western Schism.

The two mass movements are among the first ever written which use parody technique, i.e. multi-voice material from another source, in this case two of his own secular songs, is recycled and fitted into a different context. That both he and the first composer of parody movements, Antonio "Zachara" da Teramo, probably overlapped in their service in the chapel of John XXIII in Bologna, is probably no coincidence. Yet, though Zachara was clearly influential on the younger composer, the techniques used by both composers in their parody movements are quite different—Zachara's are more free in their usage of the borrowed material while Bartolomeo quoted large, contiguous sections of his secular music around which he composed new melodies.

== Works ==
All of Bartolomeo's works are edited in Gilbert Reaney, Early Fifteenth-Century Music volume 5 (1975).

=== Sacred ===
1. Gloria (mass movement, based on his own ballata Vince con lena)
2. Credo (mass movement, based on his own ballata Morir desio)

=== Secular ===
1. Vince con lena (ballata)
2. Morir desio (ballata)
3. Arte psalentes (ballade)
4. Mersi chiamando (rondeau)
5. Que pena maior (virelai)
