= Buonconsiglio Castle =

Castle in Trento, Italy

Coordinates: 46°04′16″N 11°07′37″E

- Trento
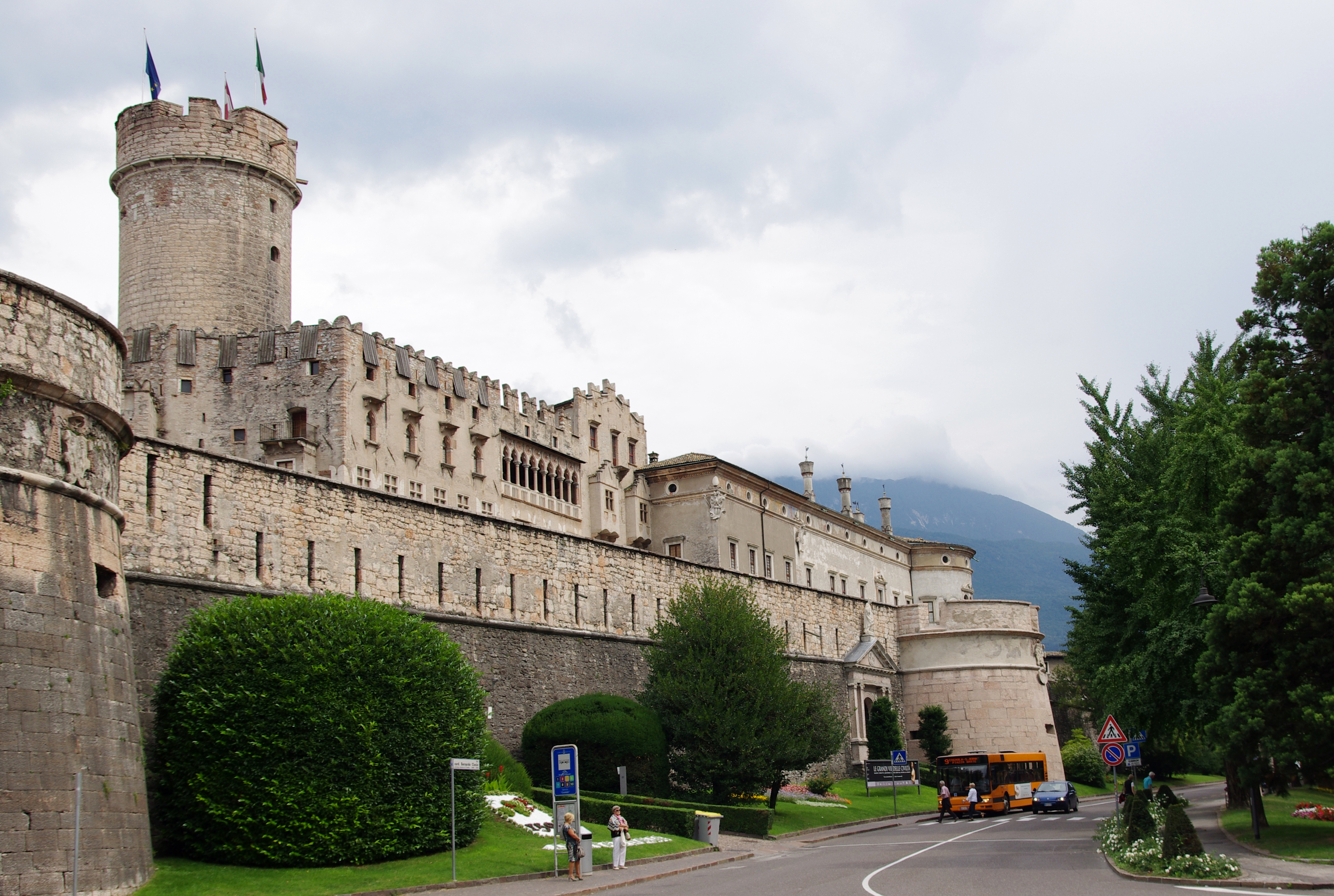

Site information
- Controlled by: Provincial Gallery of Art
- Open to the public: yes

Site history
- Built: 13th century
- Built by: Prince-Bishops of Trent

Buonconsiglio Castle (Italian: Castello del Buonconsiglio) is a castle in Trento, northern Italy.

== History ==
The castle originated from a fortified building that was erected in the 13th century next to the city's walls. This first building was called Castelvecchio (literally, 'old castle'), and was the seat of the Bishopric of Trent from the 13th century onwards to the end of the 18th century.

The castle is composed of a series of buildings of different eras, enclosed by a circle of walls in a slightly elevated position above the town. The, as called, Castelvecchio is the oldest and most dominant building of the entire housing development. The Magno Palazzo is the sixteenth expansion in the forms of the Italian Renaissance, wanted by the Prince Bishop and Cardinal Bernardo Clesio (1485–1539), the third part, in the southern end of the complex is the known Eagle tower, which preserves the famous Cycle of the Months, one of the most fascinating pictorial cycles of profane late Middle Ages.

Bishop George of Liechtenstein was the first to enlarge the castle, in the late 14th century, turning it into a well-styled residence. The Castelvecchio was further modified by Johannes Hinderbach, who had the double loggia Gothic entrance gate built. In the first decades of the 16th century, Bishop Bernardo Clesio had a new residence, called Palazzo Magno ("Grand Palace") built in Renaissance style alongside the old castle. The last great addition was the so-called Giunta Albertiana, from the name of Bishop Francesco Alberti Poja (1686), with which the Castelvecchio and the Palazzo Magno were united.

The castle remained the seat of the Prince-Bishops until 1803. Used by the Austrians as military barracks and, later, as a jail, it decayed. In the 1920s, when Trento was returned to Italy, it became seat of a National Museum and was restored. Since 1992 it is home to the Provincial Gallery of Art.

According to legend, it was connected by a secret tunnel to the city's cathedral, which allowed the prince-bishops to move unseen between them.

In 2015, rights were granted for the first time to film inside the castle, for Sebastiano Serafini's music video for his single "Akane".

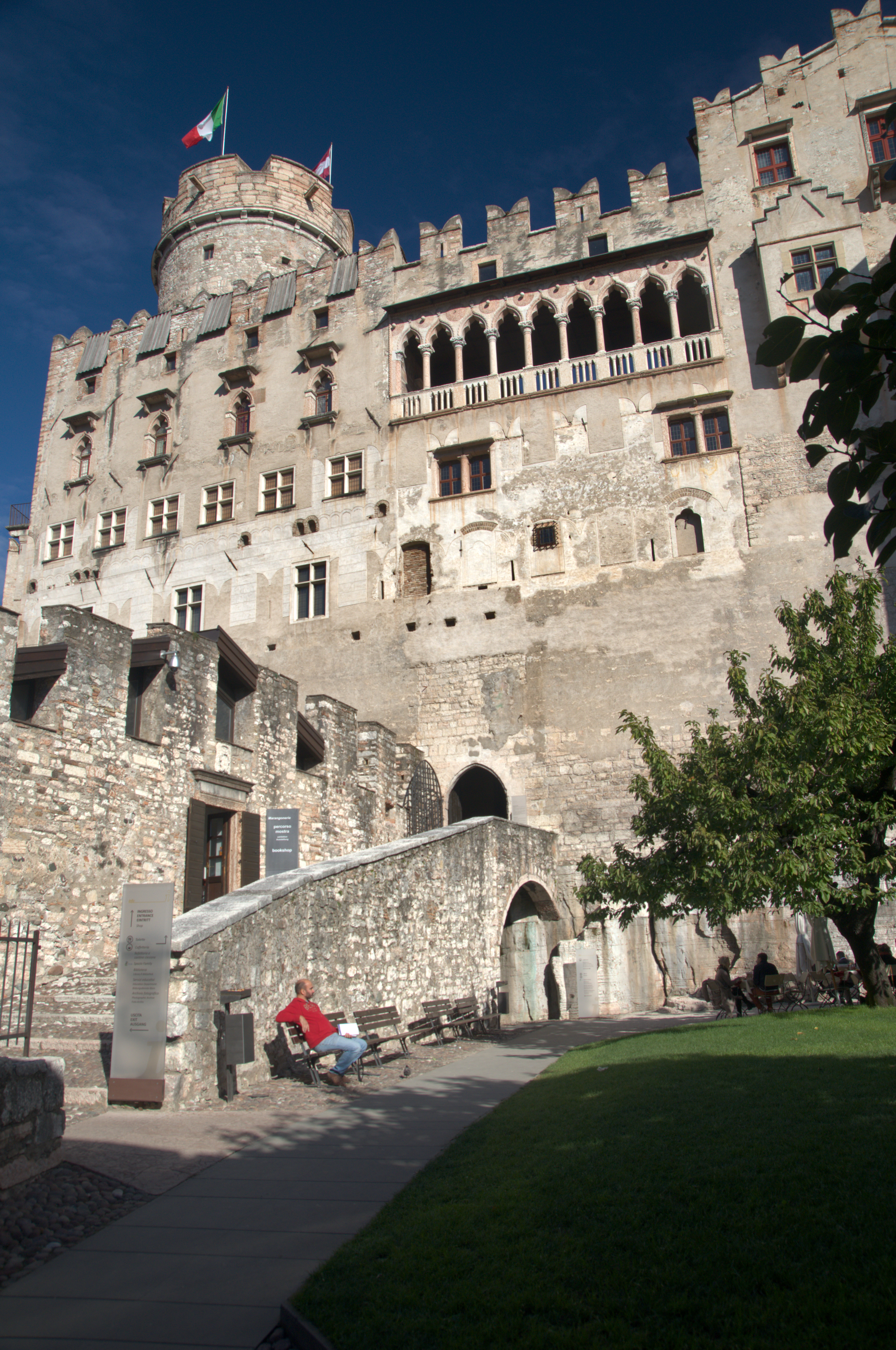
Façade of the castle

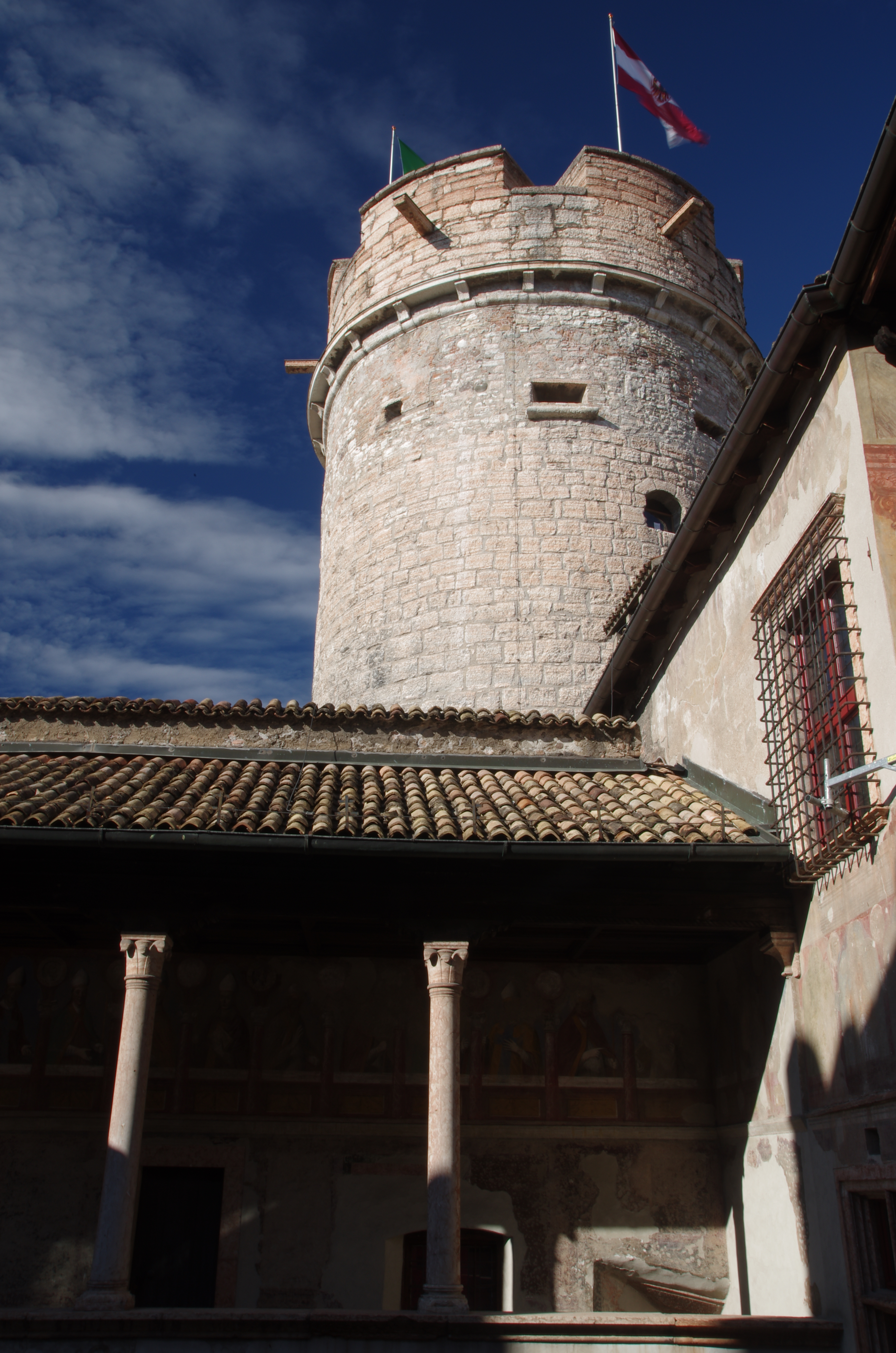
Augusto Tower view inside the castle

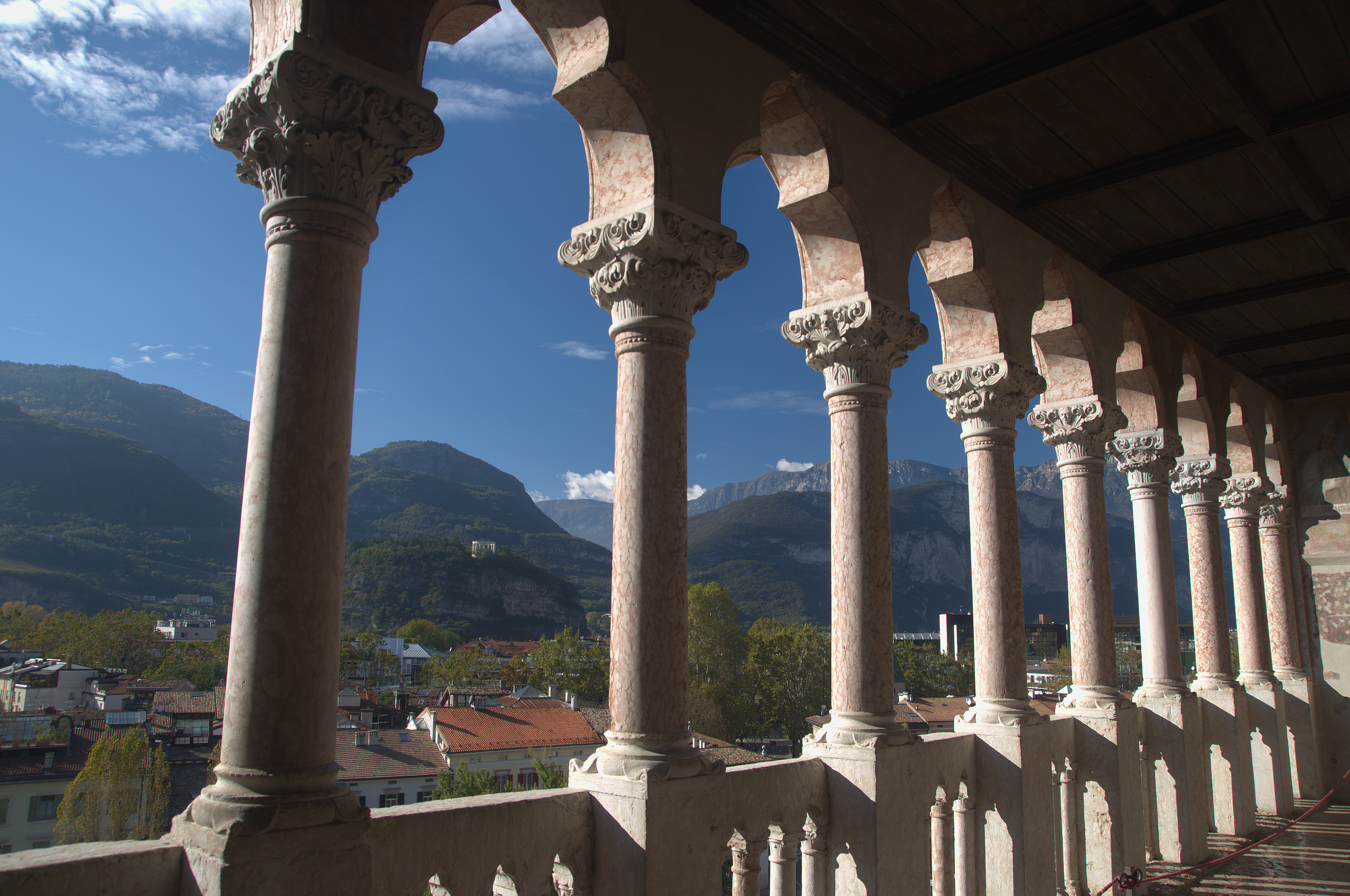
The Venetian Gothic Loggia of Buonconsiglio Castle

== Interior ==
The interior halls have precious frescoes, including those in the Torre Aquila ("Eagle Tower"), which are one of the most noteworthy examples of International Gothic art in Europe: they represent the "Cycle of the Months" (15th century) and were made by Mistr Václav (master Wenceslas) from Bohemia. The cycle is interesting also for its accurate portrayal of the landscape, the economic activities, the habits and the fashion of Medieval Trentino. The walls of Torre del Falco (late 16th century) have frescoes with hunting scenes, also a rare example of German landscape painting in northern Italy.

The decoration of the Palazzo Magno (Big Palace) section was commissioned in the early 16th century by prince-bishop Bernardo Clesio. Dosso Dossi and his brother Battista painted the frescoes in the Sala Grande, Sala degli Specchi, the Camera del Camin Nero, the Stua della Farnea (the refectory), the Library and others. Girolamo Romanino frescoed, among the others, the loggia in the Lions' Court (Cortile dei Leoni) with typical Renaissance themes, such as mythological or ancient Roman episodes, as well as biblical ones, and others from daily life. He also painted a portrait of Bernardo Clesio in the Sala delle Udienze ("Audience Hall"), accompanied by those of members of the Habsburg family (for which Clesio had worked as a diplomat).

The castle is home to the collection of Major Taddeo de Tonelli including a mummified cat.

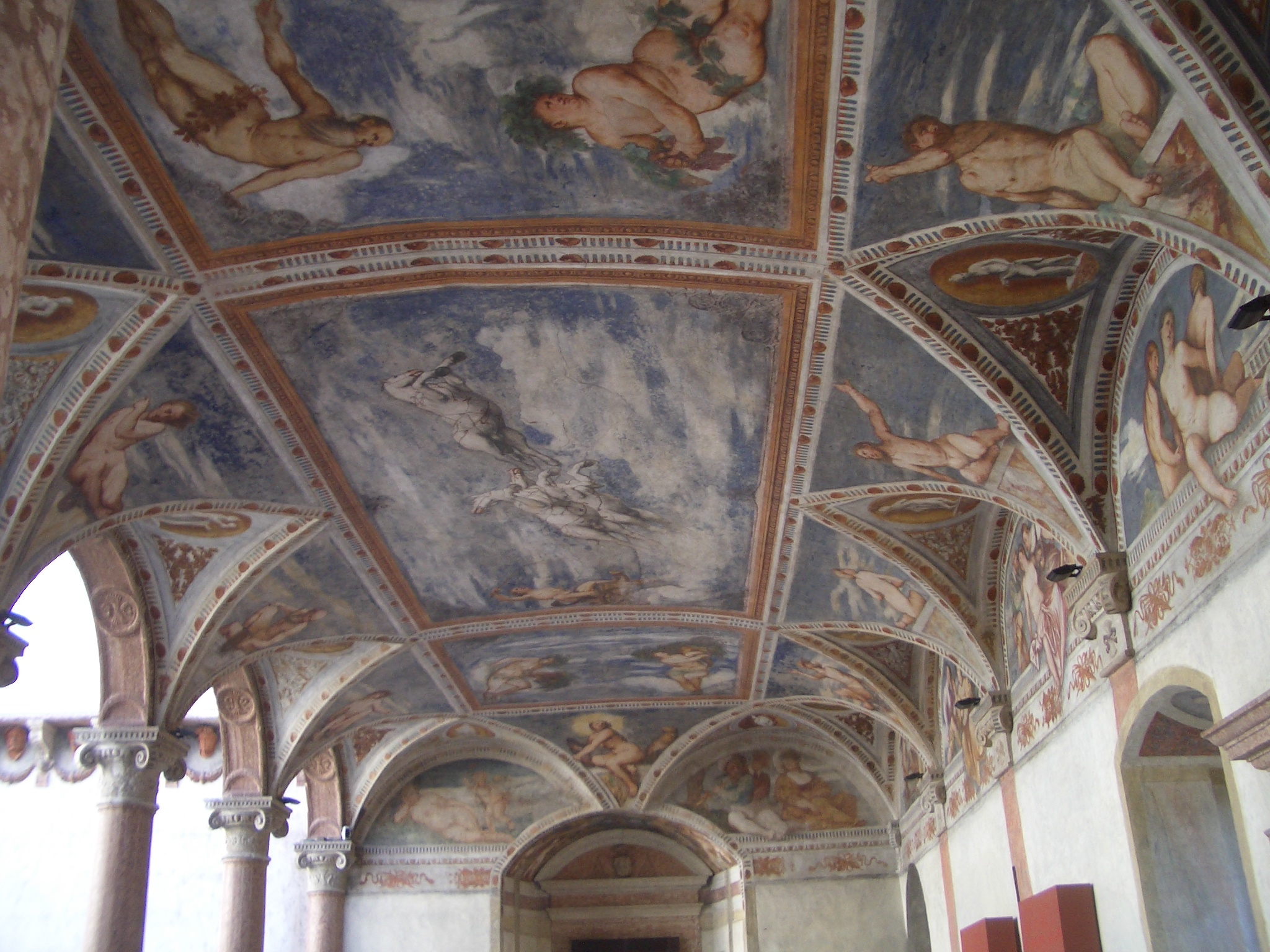
Romanino's frescoes in the Loggia del Cortile dei Leoni

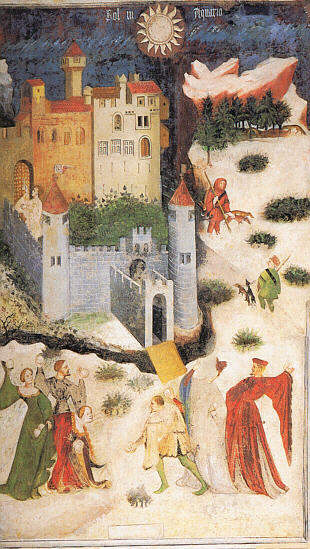
Fresco January in the Aquila Tower

== See also ==
- Trent Codices

== Sources ==
- Gorfer, Aldo (1992). I castelli di Trento (in Italian). Trento: Arti Grafiche Saturnia.
