= Nicolaus Zacharie =

Italian composer (c.1400–1466)

- Born: c. 1400
- Origin: Brindisi, Italy
- Died: 1466 (aged 65–66)
- Occupation: Composer

Nicolaus Zacharie (c. 1400 or before – 1466) was an Italian composer of the early Renaissance. Until recently he had been confused with the earlier composer Zacara da Teramo, but recent research has established his identity; he was one of a few native Italian composers working in the early 15th century whose work has survived.

== Life ==
He was probably from Brindisi or somewhere nearby, on the evidence of papal archives. The earliest solid record of his life is February 7, 1420, when he was employed at Florence Cathedral as a singer; on the evidence of his motet Letetur plebs, which includes the comment in the score "composed in Taranto, in a great hurry" it is presumed he was already active as a composer prior to coming to Florence in 1420. Just a few months later – June 1 – Pope Martin V hired him during a trip to Florence, taking him back to the papal choir in Rome, probably in September when he returned there, having successfully ended the Western Schism a few years before. Zacharie remained in the choir until 1424, and after an absence of ten years joined again for a few months in 1434; his whereabouts between those two periods is unknown.

At the end of his life he was a chaplain at the church of Santa Maria in Ceglie Messapico, about 40 km west of Brindisi in the far southeast of Italy.

== Music ==
Only three works by Zacharie have survived with reliable attribution: a motet, a Gloria, and a secular song, a ballata. The longest is the motet Letetur plebs. It begins with a long passage in imitation, but the rest of the composition uses none at all. As is true of much music from southern and central Italy of the quattrocento, there is very little French influence; the influence of the ars subtilior is not to be found in Zacharie's surviving music.

On stylistic evidence, all three of his surviving compositions were probably written around the same time, most likely between 1415 and around 1430.

== Works ==
1. Et in terra pax (3 voices)
2. Letetur plebs fidelis/Pastor qui revelavit (4 voices)
3. Già per gran nobeltà trihumpho et fama (2 voices) (ballata)
