= Pange lingua, WAB 31 =

1835 motet composed by Anton Bruckner

Pange lingua
- Motet by Anton Bruckner
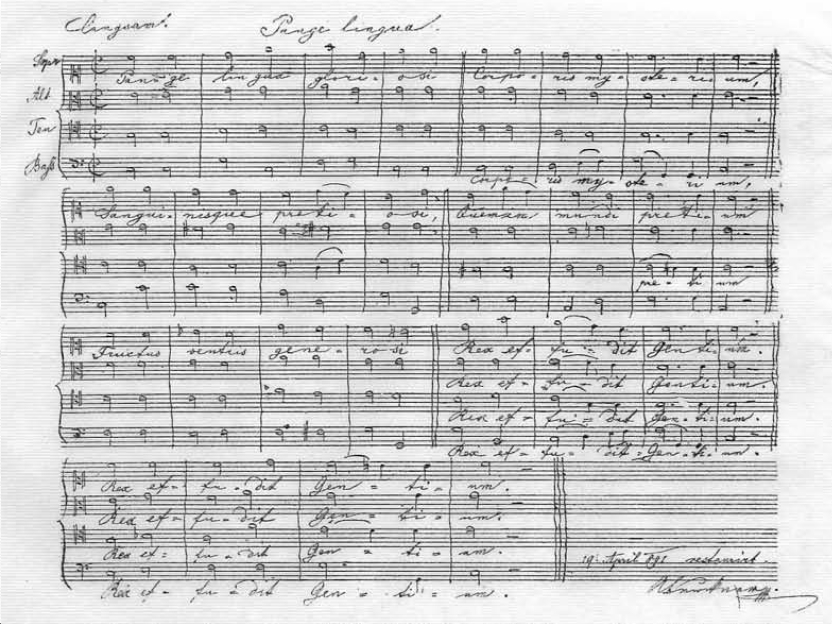
- Autograph manuscript of the work (1891 version)
- Key: C major
- Catalogue: WAB 31
- Text: Pange lingua
- Language: Latin
- Composed: c. 1835: Hörsching (first version); 19 April 1891: Vienna (second version)
- Dedication: Celebration of Corpus Christi
- Published: 1927: Regensburg
- Vocal: SATB choir

Pange lingua (Tell, my tongue), WAB 31, is a sacred motet composed by Anton Bruckner in c. 1835. It is a setting of the first strophe of the Latin hymn Pange lingua for the celebration of Corpus Christi.

== History ==
Bruckner composed the motet in c. 1835 when, as eleven-year-old boy, he was studying by Johann Baptist Weiß in Hörsching. It is not known whether it was performed at that time. In 1891, towards the end of his life, Bruckner "restored" this beloved very first composition.

The first version of the work, the original manuscript of which is lost, was found as a transcription by Franz Bayer, Steyr. The transcription of the first version and the manuscript of the 1891 version are stored in the archive of the Österreichische Nationalbibliothek.

The second version of the motet was first published as a facsimile in 1927 by Max Auer in his book Anton Bruckner as Kirchenmusiker. The first version was first published in band II/1, p. 228 of the Göllerich/Auer biography. The two versions are put in Band XXI/1 and 39 of the Gesamtausgabe.

== Music ==
The work is a setting of 28 bars in C major of the first verse of the Pange lingua for mixed choir a cappella.

On 19 April 1891 Bruckner made some "restoration" of the work. The differences between the two versions are small, mainly a different articulation in bars 15 and 22, and a reharmonisation of bars 25-27.

== Discography ==
=== First version ===
There are two recordings of the first version:

- Philipp von Steinäcker, Vocalensemble Musica Saeculorum, Bruckner: Pange lingua - Motetten - CD: Fra Bernardo FB 1501271, 2015
- Markus Stumpner, Erinnerung - Bruckner in St. Florian, Sankt Florianer Sängerknaben – CD: Solo Musica SM 450, 2024

=== Second version ===
There is a single recording of the 1891 version:

- Jonathan Brown, Ealing Abbey Choir, Anton Bruckner: Sacred Motets – CD: Herald HAVPCD 213, 1997

Note: A live performance by Philipp von Steinäcker is available in the Bruckner Archive.

== Sources ==
- Max Auer, Anton Bruckner als Kirchenmusiker, G. Bosse, Regensburg, 1927
- August Göllerich, Anton Bruckner. Ein Lebens- und Schaffens-Bild, c. 1922 – posthumous edited by Max Auer by G. Bosse, Regensburg, 1932
- Anton Bruckner – Sämtliche Werke, Band XXI: Kleine Kirchenmusikwerke, Musikwissenschaftlicher Verlag der Internationalen Bruckner-Gesellschaft, Hans Bauernfeind and Leopold Nowak (Editor), Vienna, 1984/2001
- Uwe Harten, Anton Bruckner. Ein Handbuch. Residenz Verlag, Salzburg, 1996. ISBN 3-7017-1030-9.
- Cornelis van Zwol, Anton Bruckner 1824–1896 – Leven en werken, uitg. Thoth, Bussum, Netherlands, 2012. ISBN 978-90-6868-590-9
- Crawford Howie, Anton Bruckner - A documentary biography, online revised edition
