= G. Dupoitt =

Composer, presumed to be French (fl. 1420–1430)

G. Dupoitt (fl. ca. 1420–1430) was a composer, presumed to be French, about whom little is known. His only known work is the three-voice motet "Salve mater misericordie, stella maris," found in the Trent Codices (I-TRbc 92, 135v–136). There the piece is attributed to G. Dupoitt, but the name has often been misread as G. Dupont. It is possible the name is a corruption or alternative spelling of Dubois.

The motet text also appears in a 13th-century English conductus found in Oxford Bodleian Library manuscripts GB-Ob 489 and 591. According to musicologist Peter Wright, Dupoitt's setting is awkward in its melodic and harmonic writing, though its mensural usage is of interest.
