= Missa Hercules Dux Ferrariae =

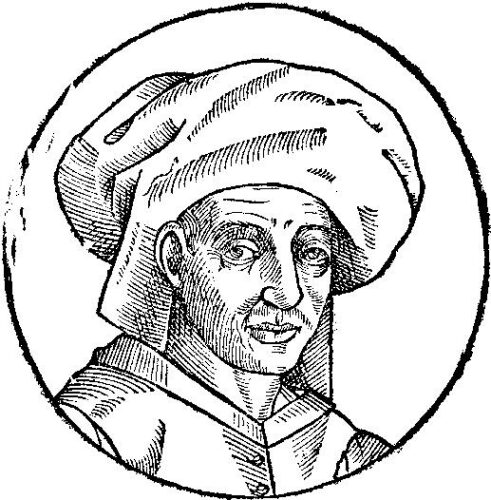
A 1611 woodcut of Josquin des Prez

The Missa Hercules dux Ferrariae is a setting of the Ordinary of the Mass composed by Josquin des Prez, and dedicated to Ercole d'Este I, Duke of Ferrara. The musical source material for the mass, the cantus firmus, is derived from the musical letters in the Duke's name, a technique called soggetto cavato.

== History ==
The interest of the Missa Hercules Dux Ferrariae lies in Josquin's association with the court of Ferrara. However, there are no records of an explicit or formal relationship between Josquin des Prez and the Duke of Ferrara. There is, however, much to suggest an informal relationship.

Duke Ercole d'Este I of Ferrara reigned from 1471 to 1505. His accomplishments during his reign are significant. The revival of classical drama at the court opened the way to a "lively tradition of secular theatre that lasted through the sixteenth century and is significant for the pre-history of opera." During his reign, the architect Biagio Rossetti enlarged the city and built new streets and palazzi making Ferrara the first planned city in Europe. Ercole negotiated advantageous marriages for all his children to other dynasties and maintained a strategic political alliance with France. "What we may call the politics of culture at Ferrara under Ercole emerges in part from his carefully calculated dealings with the Papacy on the one hand and the court of France on the other. When we look at the development of music at Ferrara in his time, the effects of this dual diplomacy are obvious, and it becomes clear why Ferrara, as a virtual client state of French political interests in Italy, should have been able to rise to the level of a musical center of international significance during the thirty-five years of Ercole's reign."

Duke Ercole was passionate about music, a passion that was shared by all of his children. Ercole's older brother, Leonello, had also fostered music during his reign from 1441 to 1450. Shortly after Ercole began his reign, he was able to obtain an impressive chapel of talented musicians and it became one of the largest chapels in Europe at the time. He went to extraordinary efforts to attract singers to Ferrara and to hold them in service. He efforts went so far as to even negotiate with the Pope for the right to confer benefices on the singers himself.

Duke Ercole's main competitor for attracting musician was his friend, Duke Sforza of Milan who also had an impressive chapel. And, of course, Duke Sforza's chapel included Josquin. It is from this friendship between the two Dukes that Josquin most probably began his informal relationship with the Duke of Ferrara. Following Josquin's pilgrimage to Rome in August 1484, there is no information about his whereabouts until 1486. Significantly, Duke Antonio Sforza visited Duke Ercole of Ferrara in 1480 for an extended period of 18 months. Duke Antonio's retinue for the visit numbered some 200 men, most likely including Josquin.

Although not officially documented, it is probable that the Missa Hercules Dux Ferrariae was written during this time. Because so little is known about Josquin's life, it is difficult to place his works in any sort of chronology. However, some scholars, such as Patrick Macey, believe that the style of the mass points itself to this time period; others propose that it may have been written during the period 1503/1504, also for stylistic reasons. Furthermore, Duke Ercole's predecessor, Duke Borso, sought to glorify himself through the acquisition of titles, honors, rare manuscripts and portraits including several frescos of himself and his court. "Ercole evidently sought a way of securing his worldly fame that would compete with that of Borso but avoid direct comparison, and this ... may be the basis for the glorification of his name and rank that is conveyed in an unprecedented way in Josquin's Missa Hercules Dux Ferrara."

Josquin's relationship with the court seems to have continued until the Duke's death in 1505, although Josquin himself departed in 1504 to flee an outbreak of the plague. Several documents support this continued association, including a letter from the French court in 1501 to the Duke discussing Josquin's recruiting efforts in Flanders in behalf of the Duke. In 1502 a letter to the Duke from his secretary recommends the hiring of Isaac instead of Josquin because Isaac is "able to get on better with his colleagues and composes new pieces quicker. It is true, Josquin composes better, but he does it only when it suits him and not when it is requested. More than this, Josquin asks 200 ducats while Isaac is pleased with 120." The Duke ignored his secretary's recommendation and Josquin came to Ferrara in 1503 and received the 200 ducat salary he had requested, which was the most a chapel master had ever received there.

Unfortunately, Josquin's stay at the court of Ferrara was short lived. The following year, 1504, Josquin fled to Condé-sur-l'Escaut in France from the plague which claimed Josquin's replacement, Obrecht, just a year later, in the summer of 1505. Once again, little is known about Josquin's life during this time following his departure; however, it is probable that Josquin served King Louis XII at least until 1515. He stayed in Condé until his death in 1521.

== Music ==
The Missa Hercules Dux Ferrariae is significant in that it is not only the most famous example of a soggetto cavato, but also the first. Part of the success of Josquin's Hercules Mass is due to the pitch pattern that was derived from his text. All pitches are based firmly in the C hexachord, the pitches begin and end on D the modal final, the tessitura is small and they form two units of four notes each with different linear motions. The first is a stepwise oscillation, the second is a leap followed by descending conjunct motion.

As the premiere soggetto cavato, Josquin's Hercules Mass is rigid in comparison to Josquin's other pieces. The compositional style is exclusively polyphonic unlike some of his other pieces which incorporate homophonic passages. The Mass remains in the same mode throughout and his use of the cantus firmus is straightforward.

There are, however, some interesting characteristics in his use of the cantus firmus. The cantus firmus is repeated three times in almost every section of the work. In each instance, the cantus firmus begins on the final d and moves to the confinal a and then to the final d displaced by an octave. The cantus firmus is almost exclusively in the tenor with four exceptions, once at the beginning of the mass in the Kyrie in the soprano, once in the Sanctus in the alto and twice in the superius in the last section of the Agnus Dei.

Josquin manipulates the cantus firmus to two different ways. In the last section of the credo and the first section of the Agnus Dei, Josquin retrogrades the cantus firmus. In both retrogrades, Josquin also reverses the order of the tessitura beginning at the octave final, then moving to the confinal and then the final. The other alteration of the cantus firmus occurs in the last section of the credo and the Osanna in which Josquin diminutes the cantus. Although interesting, both the retrograde and diminution of the cantus firmus was not an uncommon compositional technique.

The only two sections which exclude the cantus firmus use another common compositional technique of the day, that of canon. In the second section of the Sanctus, Josquin composes a two-part canon for alto and bass. The bass begins the canon on the final with the alto entering one tact afterward on the confinal. The other canon occurs in the second section of the Agnus Dei. This three-part canon is scored for soprano, alto and bass, although the tessitura of the bass places it in the tenor range. This canon is begun by the alto followed by the soprano four tacts later and then the bass similarly. The altos canon begins on the final whereas both soprano and bass begin on the confinal.

For voicing Josquin scored the mass for four voices. However, since the tenor only sings the cantus firmus which occurs less than half the time, the mass is really a three voiced mass that occasionally slips into four voices when the cantus firmus enters. However, for climatic purposes, Josquin does write the final section of the Agnus Dei for six voices. Furthermore, as mentioned above, the soprano sing the cantus firmus twice in addition to the three times that the tenors sing it. Undoubtedly, this was to reemphasize the soggetto cavato and its meaning and tribute to the Duke of Ferrara.
