= Missa Caput =

Musical setting of the mass

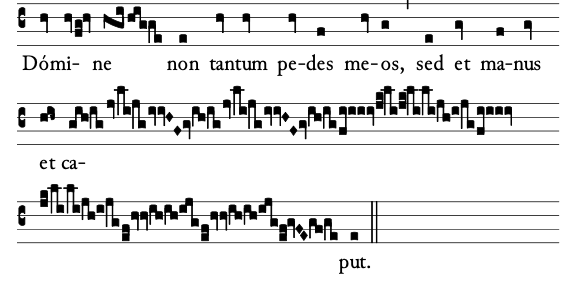
Mellisma on "Caput", from the ending of Venit ad Petrum, as given in the 1508 Sarum Graduale: "Lord, not only my feet, but hands and head."

The Missa Caput is a cyclic mass setting employing as a tenor cantus firmus the closing melisma on the word "caput" or "head" from the foot-washing antiphon Venit ad Petrum. The earliest such mass is attributed to Guillaume Du Fay (c.1400 – 1474) in the Trent Codices, but since the discovery of fragmentary English sources it has been accepted as the work of an anonymous English composer of the 1440's.

It circulated widely on the European continent in the mid-15th century and was one of the best-loved musical works of the early Renaissance in Europe, judging by the number of copies that have survived, and the number of imitations it inspired. It was influential both as a prototype of the tenor mass and as the first extended composition with a freely composed bass line, a feature with extraordinary ramifications in music history. Later Caput masses by Johannes Ockeghem and Jacob Obrecht both appear to be directly modeled on this setting.

A 2006 article by Anne Walters Robertson puts forth a symbolic interpretation of the 'head' motive, divorced from a Maundy Thursday context.

== Background ==
The cantus firmus on which the mass is based, which was long of mysterious origin, was discovered by Manfred Bukofzer to be from the Sarum Rite: the melisma on the last word, "caput", from the antiphon Venit ad Petrum, which was used at the Mandatum ceremony (the Washing of the Feet) on Maundy Thursday during Holy Week. The melisma on the single word is long and dramatic, containing over 100 notes, and spanning the interval of an octave. Within the melisma the melodic interval of the fourth is prominent and is repeated several times, and several modes, including Phrygian, Dorian and Mixolydian, are implied, giving it an extraordinary melodic diversity.

While originally the Caput mass was thought to have been by Guillaume Du Fay – since it is attributed to him in its most complete source, the Trent Codices – recent research has established that it originated in England. The cyclic mass has been shown to be a development of English origin, enthusiastically taken up by composers of the Burgundian School, and eventually becoming the primary vehicle for long-span musical expression in the High Renaissance.

Two other masses, one by Johannes Ockeghem and one by Jacob Obrecht, as well as a Marian Antiphon (Salve Regina) by Richard Hygons, are known to be based on the same cantus firmus. A modern use of the caput melisma appears in Brian Ferneyhough's solo violin work, Unsichtbare Farben.

== The mass ==
It is a setting of the main movements of the ordinary of the mass, the Kyrie, Gloria, Credo, Sanctus, and Agnus Dei. Unlike most cyclic English masses of the period, it includes a polyphonic Kyrie with the trope Deus creator omnium: usually the troped Kyrie proper to the day was sung in plainchant. Each movement states the structural melody twice through, and always in the tenor. It is stylistically close enough to the work of John Dunstaple that it has been suggested that it may be his work, but no actual link has been found.

The most significant feature of the mass for the development of music on the continent was its freely composed bass line. The possibilities must have been obvious to composers, since many immediately imitated the procedure, which allowed for harmonic freedom unchained to the tenor, a voice which formerly inhabited the lowest range alone. Freely composed, the bass could control harmony in a way that made possible the chord progressions and gradual shift to functional tonality that took place a hundred years later. The late 15th century was to see an outpouring of music exploiting low tessituras, for example in the output of Johannes Ockeghem, an innovation which began with the Missa Caput.

== Possible symbolism ==
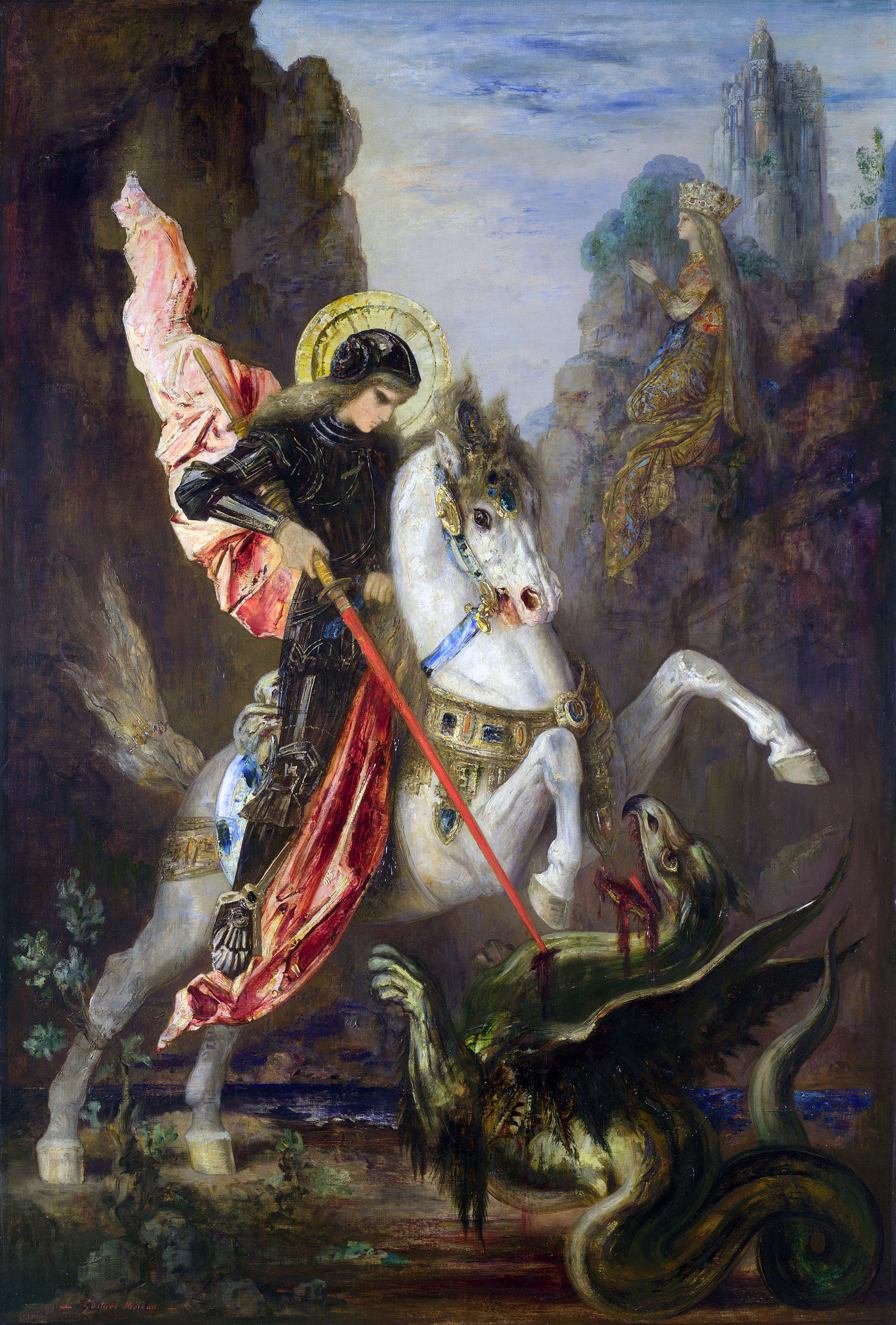
Saint George stabbing the Dragon may have been the inspiration for the anonymous 15th century Missa Caput.

Another of the mysteries of the Missa Caput, which became especially prominent after the source of the cantus firmus was discovered, was why an elaborate polyphonic composition would have been written for a time in the liturgical calendar which generally avoided polyphonic musical display. Little music was written in an elaborate manner for any events during the Lenten season, and Maundy Thursday was the most mournful of all the days in that period. One suggestion is that the symbolism of the Caput ("head" in Latin) has not been taken into account, and while the Sarum Rite chant melisma may have been used as the source, the mass was used for an entirely different purpose, one perhaps based on this symbolism. Suggestions for this center around the symbolic meaning of "head".

Following is the Latin from the end of the Sarum antiphon, Venit ad Petrum, with its English translation (KJV):

...domine non tantum pedes meos sed et manus et caput."

"[Simon Peter saith unto him], Lord not my feet only, but also my hands and my head."

In the fifteenth century, a common motif in religious iconography was the crushing of the head of the serpent, as seen in illustrations of Saint George and the Dragon. Celebrating this victory may have been one of the intents of the Missa Caput. In addition, numerous illustrations and documents show the Virgin crushing the head of the serpent herself: this could establish the connection with the other use of the Caput melisma, in the Marian Antiphon Salve Regina by Hygons.
