= Parody mass =

Musical setting of the mass

A parody mass is a musical setting of the mass, typically from the 16th century, that uses multiple voices of a pre-existing piece of music, such as a fragment of a motet or a secular chanson, as part of its melodic material. It is distinguished from the two other most prominent types of mass composition during the Renaissance, the cantus firmus and the paraphrase mass.

== Etymology ==
In the sense considered here, the term parody mass applies to masses where a polyphonic fragment from another work is used as the basis of a new composition. The term imitation mass has been suggested instead of parody mass, as being both more precise and closer to the original usage, since the term parody is based on a misreading of a late 16th-century text. In contradistinction, masses which incorporated only a single voice of the polyphonic source, treated not as a cantus firmus ('Tenor Mass') but elaborated and moving between different parts, are referred to by writers on musical theory as paraphrase masses. Other compositional techniques provided the basis for the cyclic mass, canon mass, and soggetto cavato.

The modern English word 'parody' derives from Latin: parodia 'parody', from Ancient Greek: parōidia, 'burlesque song or poem', from para- 'beside, parallel to' (in this case, "mock-") + ōidē 'song, or ode". See also A. Ancient Greek: parode, the first ode sung by the chorus after its entrance in the ancient Greek drama.

In the case of masses, "parody" has almost nothing to do with humor or ridicule, as understood in the modern definition of the word; while in some cases bawdy secular songs were indeed used in composition of masses, equally often non-liturgical sacred music such as motets formed the basis for parody masses.

== History ==
The parody or imitation mass was a very popular model during the Renaissance: Palestrina alone wrote some 50-odd examples, and by the first half of the 16th century this style was the dominant form. The Council of Trent, in a document dated 10 September 1562, banned the use of secular material, "...let nothing profane be intermingled ... banish from church all music which contains, whether in the singing or the organ playing, things that are lascivious or impure." The proposed reforms were most carefully followed only in Italy; in France, a change in taste had already brought about many of the wishes of the members of the council, and in Germany they were largely ignored.

Parody techniques include adding or removing voices from the original piece, adding fragments of new material, or only using the fragment at the beginning of every part of the mass. In his colossal 22-volume El melopeo y maestro of 1613, Italian music theorist Pietro Cerone gave some general guidelines for writing a parody mass: each of the main sections of the mass should start with the beginning of the source; the interior section of the Kyrie should use a secondary motive; and some portions, for example the second and third Agnus Dei, should not be chained to the model but be freely composed. He also recommended using as many subsidiary musical ideas from the model as possible.

Some examples of early parody masses include the Missa Mater Patris, Missa Malheur me bat, and Missa Fortuna desperata of Josquin des Prez, and the Missa de Dringhs by Antoine Brumel. The Missa Mater Patris by des Prez is considered to be the first true parody mass as it does not include a structural cantus firmus. By the middle of the 16th century, a high percentage of all masses composed used the parody technique.
