= Johann Ulrich Steigleder =

German composer

Johann Ulrich Steigleder (22 March 1593 – 10 October 1635) was a German Baroque composer and organist. He was the most celebrated member of the Steigleder family, which also included Adam Steigleder (1561–1633), his father, and Utz Steigleder (died 1581), his grandfather.

Steigleder was born in Schwäbisch Hall on 22 March 1593. He was instructed in music by his father Adam, whose teacher was the then-famous Simon Lohet. In 1613 he became organist of Stephanskirche in Lindau, on Lake Constance; then in 1617 he left Lindau for Stuttgart, where he became organist of the Stiftskirche the same year. In 1627 Steigleder was appointed ducal organist at the Württemberg court. While in Stuttgart, he may have taught, among others, Johann Jakob Froberger. He died of plague in 1635 in the midst of the Thirty Years' War.

Steigleder's most important works are his two published collections of organ pieces. The first, Ricercar tabulatura of 1624 (published at Stuttgart), introduced a number of important innovations. It was the first German music collection to be published using engraved copper plates (the title page indicates that the composer did the engraving himself). It was also, together with Scheidt's Tabulatura nova, one of the first German printed collections to adopt five-line notation with notes instead of letter notation. Finally, Steigleder was among the first to make the transition from modal indications such as primi toni, secundi toni, etc. to keys in keyboard music. Ricercar tabulatura consists of 12 ricercars that explore a wide range of techniques and models, from simple monothematic works to pieces with double subjects, several sections, etc.; some are inspired by Sweelinck in their structure and/or use of diminution and augmentation. One of the ricercars contains a long interlude built on imitation of cuckoo's call, like Frescobaldi's and Kerll's capriccios sopra Cucu.

Steigleder's Tabulaturbuch (Strasbourg, 1627) consists of 40 variations on Luther's chorale "Vater unser im Himmelreich". This collection was intended for the church organist, and Steigleder specifically states that the performer may choose how many variations to play, which ones and in what sequence. Certain variations call for a supporting instrument or singer to reinforce the chorale melody. Steigleder employs a vast array of techniques from simple 2 voice settings to double counterpoint, extensive multi-sectional fantasies and toccatas, various canons, hocket, and many more.

In part because of his early death Steigleder did not exert much influence over the development of keyboard music in Europe. Thematic connections with his work, however, were found in Froberger's music.

== Discography ==
Ricercar Tabulatura 1624. Organist: Olimpio Medori, SS. Annunziata organ, Florence (Cornetto, 2004)

Meantone Steigleder : Ricercar Tabulatura 1624. Organist: Gary Verkade. The Grönlund organ in Norrfjärden church, Sweden (Euridice, 2016)
