= Zacara da Teramo =

Italian composer (c. 1350 - c. 1416)

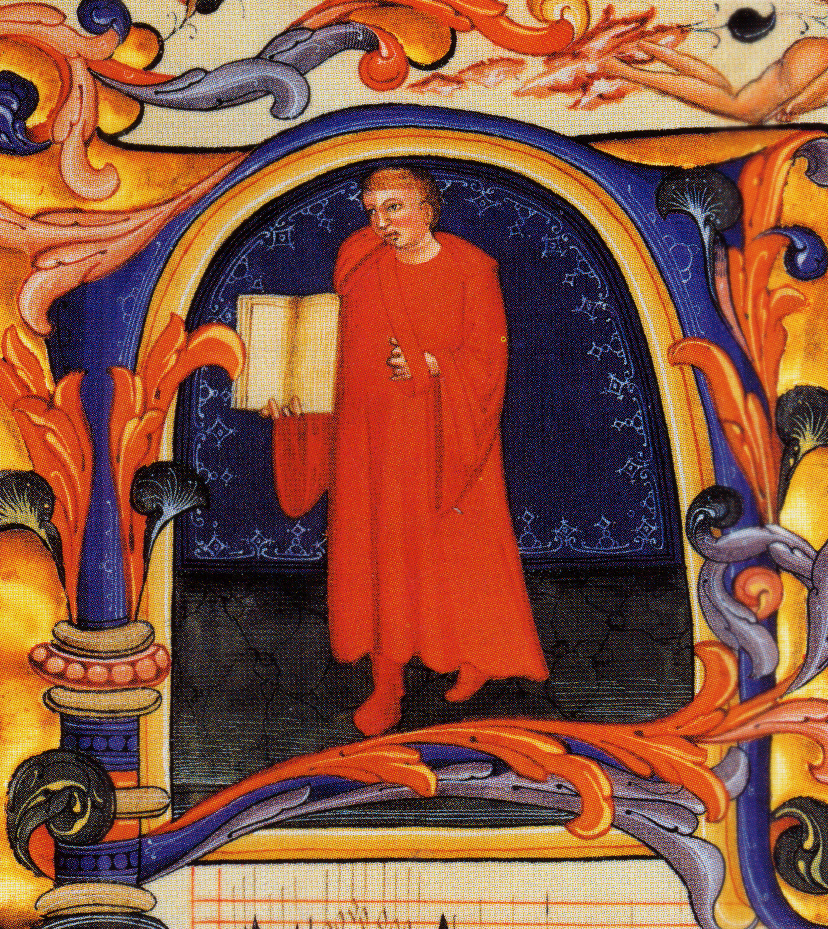
Antonio Zacara da Teramo (illustration from the 15th century Squarcialupi Codex showing his physical ailments)

Antonio "Zacara" da Teramo (in Latin Antonius Berardi Andree de Teramo, also Zacar, Zaccara, Zacharie, Zachara, and Çacharius; c.1350/1360 – between May 19, 1413 and mid-September 1416) was an Italian composer, singer, and papal secretary of the late Trecento and early 15th century. He was one of the most active Italian composers around 1400, and his style bridged the periods of the Trecento, ars subtilior, and beginnings of the musical Renaissance.

== Life ==
Antonio was probably from Teramo, in northern Abruzzo (Kingdom of Naples), not far from the Adriatic coast. In musical sources he is sometimes called "Antonio da Teramo" and otherwise "Zacara da Teramo" (or something similar) leading many musicologists to suggest there were two composers of similar names. The possibility that two people were being conflated was removed in 1979 by research into the composer's life by Agostino Ziino. (Another composer with a similar name, Nicolaus Zacharie, is considered to be a different person from the following generation of composers).

Antonio's nickname "Zaccara" (or "Zachara"; often regularized in modern editions as "Zacara") probably is a reference to his short stature (he is described as having "statura corporis parva" in a 15th-century biography). The name Zacara means a small thing or a thing of little value; hence the reason why Antonio never used the nickname himself and documents produced in circles close to the composer are careful to call him some variation on "Antonius vulgatus dictus Zachara" (Anthony, commonly called Zacara).

Nothing is known about his life until he is recorded in Rome, in 1390, as a teacher at the Ospedale di Santo Spirito in Sassia; the document mentions that he was not young at the time of this appointment, but his exact age is not given. In the next year he became a secretary to Pope Boniface IX; the letter of appointment survives, and indicates that he was a married layman as well as a singer in the papal chapel. A single letter in his hand survives in the London National Archives.

He stayed at this post through the papacies of Boniface IX (to 1404), Innocent VII (1404–1406), and Gregory XII (1406–1415). This was during the turbulent period of the Western Schism, and from his surviving letters, as well as the numerous hidden, and probably subversive political references in his music, Zacara seems to have been involved in the machinations of the time. It is not known exactly when he abandoned service to Pope Gregory, but if the ballata Dime Fortuna poy che tu parlasti is indeed by Zacara then we can read in its text evidence that he left Gregory before the Council of Pisa in 1409. He is recorded as a singer in the chapel of John XXIII in Bologna in 1412 and 1413. Two documents of 1416 (one or them dated 17 and 20 September) describe him as being already dead; he owned substantial property in Teramo as well as a house in Rome at the time of his death.

The illuminated Squarcialupi Codex contains an illustration of him. He was a small man, and had a total of only ten digits altogether on both hands and feet, details which are not only evident in the portrait but mentioned in his entry in an 18th-century Abruzzi necrology.

== Music ==
Studies on Zacara's music are all relatively recent, and much remains to be solved in terms of chronology and attribution. He seems to have been active as a composer throughout his life, and a stylistic development is evident, with two general phases taking shape: an early period, dominated by song forms such as the ballata, similar in style to the work of Jacopo da Bologna or Francesco Landini; and a period possibly beginning around 1400, when he was in Rome, during which his music is influenced by the ars subtilior.

Both sacred and secular vocal music survive by Zacara, and in greater quantity than most other composers from the period around 1400. Numerous paired mass movements, Glorias and Credos, are in a Bologna manuscript (Q15), compiled beginning around 1420; seven songs appear in the Squarcialupi Codex (probably compiled 1410–1415) and 12 in the Mancini Codex (probably compiled around 1410). Three songs are found in other sources, including the ars subtilior, Latin-texted Sumite, karissimi, capud de Remulo, patres.

Apart from one caccia (Cacciando un giorno), a Latin ballade (Sumite, karissimi), and a madrigal (Plorans ploravi), his secular songs are all ballate (Fallows 2001). A recent study proposes attribution to Zacara of a French-texted two-voice composition, Le temps verrà, found in the manuscript T.III.2, in part on stylistic grounds, and in part on the basis of the politically charged, satirical subject matter of the text.

The songs in the Squarcialupi Codex and Mancini Codex differ greatly in style. Those in the former document were probably written early in Zacara's career, and show influence from lyrical mid-century Italian composers such as Landini; the music in the Mancini Codex is more closely related to the mannerist style of the ars subtilior. While exact dates on the music have not been established, it is possible that some of the music in the Mancini Codex was written after Zacara left Rome, and was more likely to be influenced by the Avignon-based avant-garde ars subtilior style; on the other hand he may have been consciously trying to create a Roman response to the music coming from the court of the schismatic antipopes.

One of the strangest of Zacara's songs, occurring in the Mancini Codex, is Deus deorum, Pluto, a two-voice invocation to the Roman god of the underworld; the text is filled with the names of the inhabitants of the infernal regions. It is "an enthusiastic prayer to Pluto, king of the demons"—not the kind of composition one would normally expect from a pious Vatican secretary. Zacara even used this song as a basis for one of his settings of the Credo of the mass.

Zacara's mass movements appears to have been influential on other composers of the early 15th century, including Johannes Ciconia and Bartolomeo da Bologna; some of his innovations can even be seen in Dufay. Zacara may have been the first to use 'divisi' passages in the upper voices. His movements are much longer than other 14th century mass movements, and use imitation extensively, as well as hocket (a more archaic technique). In general, his paired movements—Gloria, Credo—are a link between the scattered, ununified movements of the 14th century (Machaut's Messe de Nostre Dame being the significant exception) and the cyclic mass which developed in the 15th century.

Some of Zacara's pieces are found in very distant sources, indicating his fame and wide distribution, including in a Polish manuscript and in the English Old Hall Manuscript (no. 33, a setting of the Gloria).

== Recordings ==
Zacara da Teramo: Enigma Fortuna (Complete Works), ALPHA640, by La Fonte Musica and Michele Pasotti (2021). 3 hours 57 minutes.

For a complete discography of Zacara until 2004, see Gianluca Tarquinio, "Discografia di Antonio Zacara da Teramo," in Zimei 2004, pp. 421–34. Four discs comprise entirely or mostly the music of Zacara:

- An LP, Zaccaria da Teramo, RCA 2G8KY-19714/15, by "Gruppo Mensura Musicae" (1978).
- A CD, Zachara, cantore dell'antipapa (XV secolo), Quadrivium SCA 027, by an Italian group called "Sine Nomine" (1993).
- A CD, Un Fior Gentile. L'Ars Nova di Zacara da Teramo, Micrologus CDM 0012.00, by the Italian group "Ensemble Micrologus" (2004).
- A CD, Spinato Intorno Al Cor, Lawo Classics, by the Norwegian early music ensemble Currentes (2011).

== See also ==
- Music of the Trecento
