= Cyclic mass =

In Renaissance music, the cyclic mass was a musical setting of the Ordinary of the Roman Catholic Mass, in which each of the movements – Kyrie, Gloria, Credo, Sanctus, and Agnus Dei – shared a common musical theme, commonly a cantus firmus, thus making it a unified whole. The cyclic mass was the first multi-movement form in western music to be subject to a single organizing principle.

The period of composition of cyclic masses was from about 1430 until around 1600, although some composers, especially in conservative musical centers, wrote them after that date. Types of cyclic masses include the "motto" mass (or "head-motif" mass), cantus-firmus mass or tenor mass, soggetto cavato mass, paraphrase mass, parody mass, as well as masses based on combinations of these techniques.

== History ==
Prior to complete settings of the Mass Ordinary by a single composer, which had become the norm by around the middle of the 15th century, composers often set pairs of movements. Gloria-Credo pairs, as well as Sanctus-Agnus Dei pairs, are found in many manuscripts of the early 15th century, by composers such as Johannes Ciconia, Arnold de Lantins and Zacara da Teramo. While it is possible that some of these composers wrote an entire setting of the mass, no complete cyclic setting by a single composer has survived. (The Messe de Nostre Dame by Guillaume de Machaut (c. 1300–1377), which dates to before 1365 is generally not considered to be a true cyclic mass, but is the earliest surviving complete mass setting by a single composer, although the existence of at least four earlier such pieces is known.) Some mass cycles from the period 1420–1435, especially from northern Italy, show that composers were working in the direction of a unified mass, but were solving the problem in a different way: often a separate tenor would be used for each movement of a mass that was otherwise unified stylistically.

The true cyclic mass most likely originated in England, and the first composers known to have organized a mass by using the same cantus firmus in each movement were John Dunstable and Leonel Power. However it was the Missa Caput, an anonymous English composition once attributed to Guillaume Dufay, "one of the most revered compositions of the 15th century", which was to be the most influential on continental practice; this work appears in seven separate continental sources of the 15th century, more than any other mass prior to the 1480s. Among other features, it was the first widely influential work to use a freely-written bass line underneath the tenor cantus firmus. As a result of the spread of the Missa Caput, composers commonly added this lower voice to their polyphonic textures after about mid-century; this allowed a harmonic and cadential flexibility which was previously lacking.

The earliest consistently used method for organizing the movements of the mass was use of a head motif, also known as a "motto". In this case, a recognizable theme or thematic fragment began each of the important sections of the mass. Many "motto" masses were also unified by some other means, but such a procedure was not necessary. An early example of a "motto" mass is the Missa verbum incarnatum by Arnold de Lantins, probably from around 1430, in which each movement is linked by use of a head motif. Additionally, the movements contain subtle references to his own motet O pulcherrima mulierum. Many of Dufay's masses use the head-motif technique, even when they employ another, such as cantus-firmus. The motto technique was common on the continent, but rare with English composers.

During the late 15th century, cantus firmus technique was by far the most frequent method used to unify cyclic masses. The cantus firmus, which at first was drawn from Gregorian chant, but later from other sources such as secular chansons, was usually set in longer notes in the tenor voice (the next-to-lowest). The other voices could be used in many ways, ranging from freely composed polyphony to strict canon, but the texture was predominantly polyphonic but non-imitative. In some cases the cantus firmus appeared also in voices other than the tenor, with increasing freedom as the century reached its close. Secular chansons became the favored source for cantus firmi by the time of Ockeghem and his generation (the last third of the 15th century), and composers began writing their own; for example Ockeghem's Missa au travail suis is based on his own chanson of that name.

Ockeghem was a particularly experimental composer, writing probably the first example of a mass organized entirely by canon: the Missa prolationum. Instead of being based on a fixed cantus firmus, each movement is a mensuration canon, with the interval of imitation expanding from the unison to the octave during the course of the mass (Leeman Perkins called this "the most extraordinary contrapuntal achievement of the 15th century", and compared it in scope and execution with the Goldberg Variations of J.S. Bach). Another of Ockeghem's masses, the Missa cuiusvis toni, is so written that it can be performed in any of the four modes.

By the beginning of the 16th century, the cantus firmus technique was no longer the preferred method for composition of masses, except in some areas distant from Rome and the Low Countries (Spanish composers, in particular, used the method into the 16th century). Some other methods of organizing cyclic masses include paraphrase and parody.

In paraphrase technique, a source tune, which could be either sacred or secular, is elaborated, usually by ornamentation but occasionally by compression. Usually in paraphrase masses the tune appears in any voice. Josquin des Prez' Missa Pange lingua (c. 1520) is a famous example; Palestrina also used the method extensively, second only to parody technique.

The parody mass, also known as the imitation mass (for the use of the word "parody" implies no satire, but is based on a misreading of a 16th-century source), uses many voices from a polyphonic source to unify the different movements of a cyclic mass. Parody technique was the most commonly used of all the methods in the 16th century: Palestrina alone wrote 51 parody masses. Either sacred or secular source material could be used in constructing a parody mass, and some of the songs were secular indeed: a late example was Orlande de Lassus' Missa entre vous filles (1581), based on an obscene popular song by Clemens non Papa, "Entre vous filles de quinze ans" ("You sweet 15-year-old girls").

== See also ==
- Cyclic form
- Cantus firmus mass
