= Simon Lohet =

Flemish composer and organist

Simon Lohet (Loxhay) (born before c. 1550 – buried 5 July 1611) was a Flemish composer and organist of the late Renaissance, active in Germany. He is best known as one of the earliest exponents of the keyboard fugue.

== Life ==
Lohet's father was a certain Jean de Liège, so the family originates from Liège and Simon was probably born in the area. Loxhay is the Walloon version of his surname. He was appointed organist of the Württemberg court at Stuttgart on 14 September 1571, assisting Utz Steigleder and H.F. Fries until both went into retirement. Lohet then assumed full responsibility for the chapel services. He was also somewhat active as a teacher, his pupils included his own son Ludwig (who became his father's assistant in 1594) and, most importantly, Adam Steigleder (father of Johann Ulrich Steigleder). Lohet made several trips to the Low Countries in the 1570s and to Venice in 1581 to buy instruments and music. In 1601 he retired from his post. He remained in Stuttgart until his death in summer 1611.

== Works ==
Johann Woltz's Nova musices organicae tabulatura (Basel, 1617) contains all of Lohet's known works (six also survive in another manuscript, D-Mbs Mus.ms.1581). The bulk of his small surviving output consists of twenty keyboard fugues, which are also his most historically important works. Most of them are short, averaging 20-25 bars, and eight are monothematic (exploring a single subject in a single section), which is very different from contemporary examples of imitative counterpoint (i.e. ricercars and canzonas that frequently ran to 100+ bars in several sections exploring either a variety of themes or different variations of one theme) and very close, also because of frequent use of stretto entries, diminution and other contrapuntal devices, to the classic fugue of the late Baroque. A full list follows, with the number of sections given in parentheses:

1. Fuga prima (2)
2. Fuga secunda (2)
3. Fuga tertia (2)
4. Fuga quarta (1)
5. Fuga quinta (3)
6. Fuga sexta (1)
7. Fuga septima (2)
8. Fuga octava (3)
9. Fuga nona (1)
10. Fuga decima (3)
11. Fuga undecima (1)
12. Fuga duodecima (1)
13. Fuga decima tertia (2)
14. Fuga decima quarta (1)
15. Fuga decima quinta (2)
16. Fuga decima sexta (3)
17. Fuga decima septima (1)
18. Fuga decima octava (2)
19. Fuga decima nona (1)
20. Fuga vigesima (2)

Single-section fugues are all monothematic. Their subjects are typical ricercar subjects: slow, sustained, moving in whole, half- and quarter notes. In two section fugues either both sections are imitative, or the second one is in free counterpoint. Fuga quinta's three sections are all imitative, but the rest of three-section fugues feature an imitative section, a stretto/canzona subject section and a free counterpoint section for the ending. In all, Lohet's pieces represent some of the earliest keyboard fugues in the modern understanding of the word.

Lohet's other works are a canzona (which is really a monothematic fugue like the ones described above), two chorales (Erbarm dich mein O Herre Gott and Nun Welche hie ihr hoffnung gar auf Gott den Herren legen) and keyboard transcriptions of a motet (Media vita in morte) and a chanson (De tout mon coeur). The chorales are written in a style reminiscent of the later south German tradition, with the first line set imitatively.

== Editions ==
- Simon Lohet. Compositions for organ, ed. Larry W. Peterson, Corpus of Early Keyboard Music 25:9-38. See .
