= Michelangelo Rossi =

Italian composer

- Born: c. 1601; Genoa
- Died: 1656; Rome
- Occupations: Composer; Violinist; Organist

Michelangelo Rossi (Michel Angelo del Violino) (ca. 1601/1602 – 1656) was an important Italian composer, violinist and organist of the Baroque era.

Rossi was born in Genoa, where he studied with his uncle, Lelio Rossi, an organist (from 1601 to 1638), at the Cathedral of San Lorenzo. Around the year 1624, he moved to Rome to enter the service of Cardinal Maurizio of Savoy. It was there that he met the madrigal composer Sigismondo d'India as well as the keyboard composer Girolamo Frescobaldi.

Rossi's two books of madrigals, which have only comparatively recently come to scholarly attention, were likely written during this period. Rossi's madrigal output from this period is remarkably chromatic, to a level matched only by the music of such experimental composers as Carlo Gesualdo. The circumstances of Rossi's dismissal from the Cardinal's service in 1629, after a short stay in Turin, are unclear.

From 1629 to 1632, Rossi was organist in the church of San Luigi dei Francesi. Rossi's first known opera dates from his second period of Roman service, while in the retinue of the wealthy Taddeo Barberini. His opera Erminia sul Giordano was premiered during the Carnival of 1633 at the theatre of the Palazzo Barberini (Rossi himself played the violin on stage as the sun-god Apollo), and appeared in print four years later.

In 1634 Rossi left Rome to enter the service of the Duke of Modena Francesco I d'Este. A second opera by him, Andromeda (libretto by Ascanio Pio di Savoia), was first performed in Ferrara in 1638.
By 1648 Rossi had returned to Rome and from 1649 to 1655, as a chamber servant ("cameriere extra muros") of Pope Innocent X, he was residing in the palace of pope's courtesans nearby the Quirinale Palace.

He died in Rome on 7 July 1656 and was buried in the church of Sant'Andrea delle Fratte.

Although Rossi was famed as an outstanding violinist in his lifetime, no violin compositions survive and today his reputation rests chiefly on one surviving volume of keyboard music. Those 10 Toccatas are highly regarded (amongst these, Toccata VII with its wildly chromatic ending is best known). They are stylistically close to the music of Carlo Gesualdo and Johann Jakob Froberger, while being individual, and they enjoy a reputation as a significant milestone in the keyboard literature.

While the publication date of these toccatas is usually cited as 1657 [the year after Rossi's death], which is printed on one of the four surviving copies, it seems clear from research and deduction by Alexander Silbiger that they more likely were first published in the early 1630s, which not only fits with the characteristics of their style but also implies that the other keyboard composers such as Frescobaldi could easily have been influenced by Rossi as well as vice versa.
