= Soggetto cavato =

Soggetto cavato ([sodˈdʒɛtto kaˈvaːto]) is an innovative technique of Renaissance composer Josquin des Prez that was later named by the theorist Zarlino in 1558 in his Le istitutioni harmoniche as soggetto cavato dalle vocali di queste parole, or literally, a subject 'carved out of the vowels from these words.' It is an early example of a musical cryptogram.

This technique relies on the use of syllables from solmization. Guido of Arezzo, an eleventh-century monk, proposed a set of syllables for teaching singers how to sight sing. The syllables, ut, re, mi, fa, sol, la, were used to help the singers remember the pattern of whole tones and semitones. This technique, called solmization, is still used today with some minor changes, namely 'do' is used instead of 'ut,' and 'si' or 'ti' are used above 'la.'

For implementation, Josquin used these solmization vowels to carve out his musical notes. Using the vowel of each solmization syllable, Josquin coupled the musical pitch of the solmization syllable with the vowel of text he wanted to represent. In the case of the Missa Hercules dux Ferrariae, the text Josquin was trying to represent was Hercules Dux Ferrariae. Therefore, each vowel of those three words is coupled with the appropriate solmization syllable. The solmization syllables then determine the pitch to be used. Thus the subject is carved out of the vowels.

Hercules Dux Ferrariae

Her - re

cu - ut

les - re

Dux - ut

Fer - re

ra - fa

ri - mi

ae - re

re ut re ut re fa mi re

Once the soggetto cavato had been extracted from the text, the composer then used the pitches as a cantus firmus for the work. The Missa Hercules dux Ferrariae is significant in that it is not only the most famous example of a soggetto cavato, but also the first. However, it is not the only time Josquin employed this technique. Josquin wrote other soggetti cavati. He composed a secular piece using the phrase Vive le roi (ut, mi, ut, re, re, sol, mi – syllable ut used for letter v).

Josquin's Missa La sol fa re mi is a soggetto cavato with an associated story. It seems that his patron, Cardinal Ascanio Sforza, temporarily financially strapped, put off the composer's requests for payment with a reassuring "Lascia fare a me" (Leave it to me), whereupon Josquin's friend, the Renaissance poet Serafino d’Aquila, translated the remark into its musical equivalent and incorporated it into a sonnet addressed to the composer.

One of Josquin's through-composed chansons, "Mi lares vous" has the first three syllables mi, la, re in four of the five voices. And finally, his motet Illibata Dei virgo uses Josquin own name as an acrostic in a poem concerning the Virgin Mary. The soggetto la mi la is derived from the name Maria.

The soggetto cavato technique was used by other composers as well and for similar reasons. In fact, Duke Ercole II of Ferrara had five such masses dedicated to him: two by Cipriano de Rore, one by Lupus, one by Maitre Jan and one by Jacquet of Mantua. All five pieces without exception get their inspiration from Josquin's mass. The last one mentioned by Jacquet goes so far as even to quote Josquin several times and use the same sectional structure that Josquin used. However, even though Jacquet borrowed heavily from Josquin for his own version of the Hercules Mass, Jacquet did write another mass based on a soggetto cavato, Missa Ferdinandus dux Calabriae. But it seems Josquin's influence on Jacquet was strong, for this mass, too, shows many similarities to Josquin.

Lupus also seemed influenced by Josquin's soggetto cavato idea. In addition to his Hercules Mass, he wrote another soggetto cavato dedicated to Emperor Charles V entitled Missa Carolus Imperator Romanorum Quintus.

Several composers used the technique without using the Hercules Dux cantus firmus. The composer Jacobus Vaet wrote a work dedicated to the Emperor Ferdinand of Austria based upon the soggetto 'Stat felix domus Austriae'. Adrian Willaert also used a soggetto cavato in two motets for Duke Francesco II Sforza of Milan. One of Willaert's untitled masses may also be based on a soggetto cavato. Costanzo Festa's variations on La Spagna include a movement incorporating the names "Ferdinando" and "Isabella."

Although the soggetto cavato technique is interesting, it had limited use for composers. One of its limitations is the choice of pitches for each vowel. Each vowel only has one possible pitch choice with the exception of the a vowel, which could be fa or la. As mentioned previously Josquin's choice of text lends itself to a solid choice for a cantus firmus. Subsequent composers had considerable difficulty in making some of their soggetti cavati work. On top of this difficulty was the changing nature of music at the time. The composers using the soggetto cavato technique were living in an era when music was becoming liberated from chant and the cantus firmus. Because the soggetto cavato was always used as a cantus firmus, it is not surprising that as the strict cantus firmus treatment fell into disuse, so did the soggetto cavato technique.
