= Lupus Hellinck =

Flemish composer

Lupus Hellinck (also Wulfaert) (1493 or 1494 – c. 14 January 1541) was a Flemish composer of the Renaissance. He was a prominent composer of masses, as well as German chorales and motets. Although he was a Roman Catholic all of his life, his music shows evidence of sympathy for the Protestant Reformation, and three of his motets—including a famous setting of In te domine speravi—were probably inspired by the prison writings of the martyred reformer Girolamo Savonarola.

== Life ==
Hellinck was probably born in Axel. Little else is known about him until he appears as a choirboy in Bruges at St. Donatian on 24 March 1506. He left in 1511 to go to school, returning to St. Donatian in 1513 as a cleric, where he stayed until 1515.

Until recently, nothing was known of his activities for the next four years, but in 1989 some records from the Vatican archives were published that showed that he spent this time in Rome. One of these documents, dated April 1518, gave his age as 24, which gives a birth date of 1493 or 1494. During this time he was a member of the household of Pope Leo X, and around 1518 he was ordained as a priest. A further confusion, not definitively solved, is that music theorist and writer Vincenzo Galilei, father of the astronomer, included a "Lupus" from northern Europe in a list of distinguished musicians in the 1513 court of Leo X; however, Vincenzo was writing several decades later.

By June 1518 Hellinck was probably in Ferrara, in the employ of Sigismondo d'Este (that this was the same "Lupus" has been disputed, but scholarly consensus is emerging that both composers named Lupus were the same); about a year later he returned to the Low Countries, and by October 1519 was back in Bruges, where he was again employed at St. Donatian. In 1521 he became a succentor at the nearby Church of Our Lady, and he returned again to St. Donatian in 1523 to serve in the same position there.

Hellinck seems to have remained in Bruges for the rest of his life. One event which is recorded gives an indication of his attitude towards the Protestant Reformation: his participation, in 1539, in a dramatic competition at Ghent, in a production of a play which was later placed by the Catholic Church on the Index of banned books. Along with his widely distributed setting of In te domine speravi, and his two settings of the Miserere (Psalm 6 and Psalm 50, respectively), all of which have been seen as tributes to the executed reformer Savonarola, this indicates his sympathy, if not his active participation in the movement for ecclesiastical reform.

== Music and influence ==
Hellinck wrote masses, motets, German chorales, French chansons, and songs in Dutch. All of his masses use the parody technique, and many are derived from his own motets. Stylistically they are contrapuntal and highly unified, with many passages repeated in whole or part. Contrasting homophonic sections appear: for example, the passage et incarnatus est is usually set in slow-moving chords, a dramatically effective procedure also used by Josquin des Prez, as in his Missa Pange Lingua. Hellinck's closing "Agnus Dei" sections are usually made up of material heard earlier in the mass, unifying the entire composition thematically in a way which foreshadowed compositional procedures hundreds of years later.

Hellinck's motets have attracted scholarly attention in modern times because of their possible relation to the writings of Savonarola. Hellinck spent time in Ferrara, the birthplace of the reformer, in the Este court where Savonarola was still highly regarded, and where criticism of the papal establishment was possible, at least in guarded ways. While in prison, after being tortured on the rack, and within several days of his execution, Savonarola wrote two impassioned meditations on the psalms, Infelix ego and Tristitia obsedit me (on psalm 50 and 30, respectively); these texts became favorites of composers for motets during the 16th century, especially in regions distant from Rome or actively involved in the Reformation. However, prior to these texts actually being used in compositions verbatim, composers alluded to them in hidden ways: such is the case in Hellinck's motets based on psalms 30 and 50, as it was in Josquin's own famous setting of the Miserere.

The three of Hellinck's motets which were Savonarola-inspired were all likely written in Ferrara. In te domine speravi most likely dates from 1518 or 1519, although it may have been written shortly after his return to Bruges. The first of two settings of the Miserere, Miserere mei deus, based on a collection of diverse psalm verses and stylistically reminiscent of Josquin's Miserere setting, exists in an Italian source copied around 1520, and thus was probably composed in Ferrara. The other, Miserere mei domine, is based on Psalm 6, and again is reminiscent of Josquin's setting, which itself was composed in Ferrara two decades earlier.

Later in his life Hellinck wrote 11 German chorale settings in a motet style. The chorale tune is in the tenor, but differs little from the other voices rhythmically. The existence of these pieces also testifies to his support for the Protestant Reformation.

== Recordings ==
- Hellinck Missa Peccata Mea. Egidius Kwartet & College. Etcetera 2015
- Hellinck Missa Surrexit pastor Johannes Lupi Te Deum, motets. The Brabant Ensemble Stephen Rice . Hyperion 2020
