= Savonarola =

Savonarola is an Italian surname. Notable people with the surname include:

- Girolamo Savonarola (1452–1498), Italian Dominican friar and reformer
- Michele Savonarola (1385–c. 1466), Italian physician, humanist and historian
