= Miserere (Josquin) =

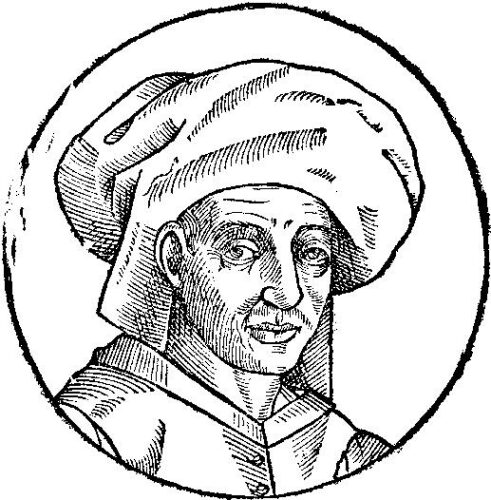
A 1611 woodcut of Josquin des Prez

The Miserere, by Josquin des Prez, is a motet setting of Psalm 51 (Psalm 50 in the Septuagint numbering) for five voices. He composed it while in the employ of Duke Ercole I d'Este in Ferrara, in 1503 or 1504. It was one of the most famous settings of that psalm of the entire Renaissance, was hugely influential in subsequent settings of the Penitential Psalms, and was itself probably inspired by the recent suffering and execution of the reformer Girolamo Savonarola.

During the 1490s, the Duke of Ferrara, Ercole I d'Este, kept in close contact with Savonarola, who was also from Ferrara, and supported him in his efforts to reform the Roman Catholic Church. About a dozen letters between the two survive: the Duke sought advice both on spiritual and political matters (for example, his alliance with France). Even after Savonarola's arrest, Duke Ercole attempted to have him freed, but his last letter to the church authorities in Florence, in April 1498, went unanswered. After Savonarola's execution, Ercole, then in his eighties, probably commissioned his newly hired composer, Josquin, to write him a musical testament, very likely for performance during Holy Week of 1504. Savonarola's impassioned meditation on sin and repentance, Infelix ego, composed in prison after his torture, and published in Ferrara in mid-1498 shortly after his death, was the probable model for Josquin's setting. It is an extended prayer to the God against whom he believes he has sinned, based closely on Psalm 51, and unified by a boldface-type repetition of the phrase "Miserere mei, Deus" throughout the text.

In keeping with Savonarola's dislike of polyphony and musical display, the Miserere is written in a spare, austere style, much different from the contrapuntal complexity, virtuosity, and ornamentation of works such as the five-part motet Virgo salutiferi, which was probably written around the same time. The tenor part, which contains the repeating phrase "Miserere mei, Deus", was likely written to be sung by the Duke himself, who was a trained musician and often sang with the musicians in his chapel.

The Miserere is one of Josquin's two "motto" motets, motets in which repetitions of a phrase are the predominant structural feature (the other is the five-voice Salve Regina of several years before). In the Miserere, the opening words of the first verse "Miserere mei, Deus", sung to a simple repeated-note motif containing only two pitches (E and F), serves as the motto. This recurs after each of the 19 verses of the psalm. The motto theme begins each time on a different pitch, with the recurrences moving stepwise down the scale from E above middle C to the E an octave below, then back up again to the opening E, and then down stepwise to A fifth below, where the piece ends. In addition, the length of the motto theme is halved once it begins its ascent out of the bass, and has its length returned to normal for the final descent from E to A. These three journeys of the motto theme's opening note, down, up, and then down again, define the three divisions of the composition: a brief break is usually observed in performance between them.

While overall the composition is in the Phrygian mode, the harmonized repetitions enforce tonal variety. Texturally, the piece is so constructed that the words are always clearly intelligible. Intelligibility of sung text was not always a high priority for composers of the period, and this lack of intelligibility was a specific criticism Savonarola made of polyphonic music. Josquin arranges for the words to be heard by using chordal textures, duets, and by avoiding dense polyphony; and of course after each verse the tenor voice intones alone "Miserere mei, Deus", as in the Savonarola meditation. As tenor sings these words, the other voices join in one at a time to reinforce the first, "an effect analogous to boldface type in a printed text."

Josquin's setting of the Miserere was influential not only as a psalm setting, but as an example of how to approach the text of Infelix ego. Later in the 16th century, composers who specifically set the words of Savonarola, such as Adrian Willaert, Cipriano de Rore, and Nicola Vicentino, all of whom wrote motets on Infelix ego, used Josquin's work as a model.

== References and further reading ==
- Richard Sherr, ed., The Josquin Companion. Oxford, Oxford Univ. Press, 2000. ISBN 978-0-19-816335-0
- Gustave Reese, Music in the Renaissance. New York, W.W. Norton & Co., 1954. ISBN 978-0-393-09530-2
- Patrick Macey: "Josquin des Prez", Grove Music Online, ed. L. Macy (Accessed November 26, 2006), (subscription access)
- Patrick Macey, Bonfire Songs: Savonarola's Musical Legacy. Oxford, Clarendon Press. 1998. ISBN 978-0-19-816669-6
- Lewis Lockwood, Music in Renaissance Ferrara, 1400-1505. Cambridge, Massachusetts, 1984.
