= Penitential psalm =

Psalms expressive of sorrow for sin

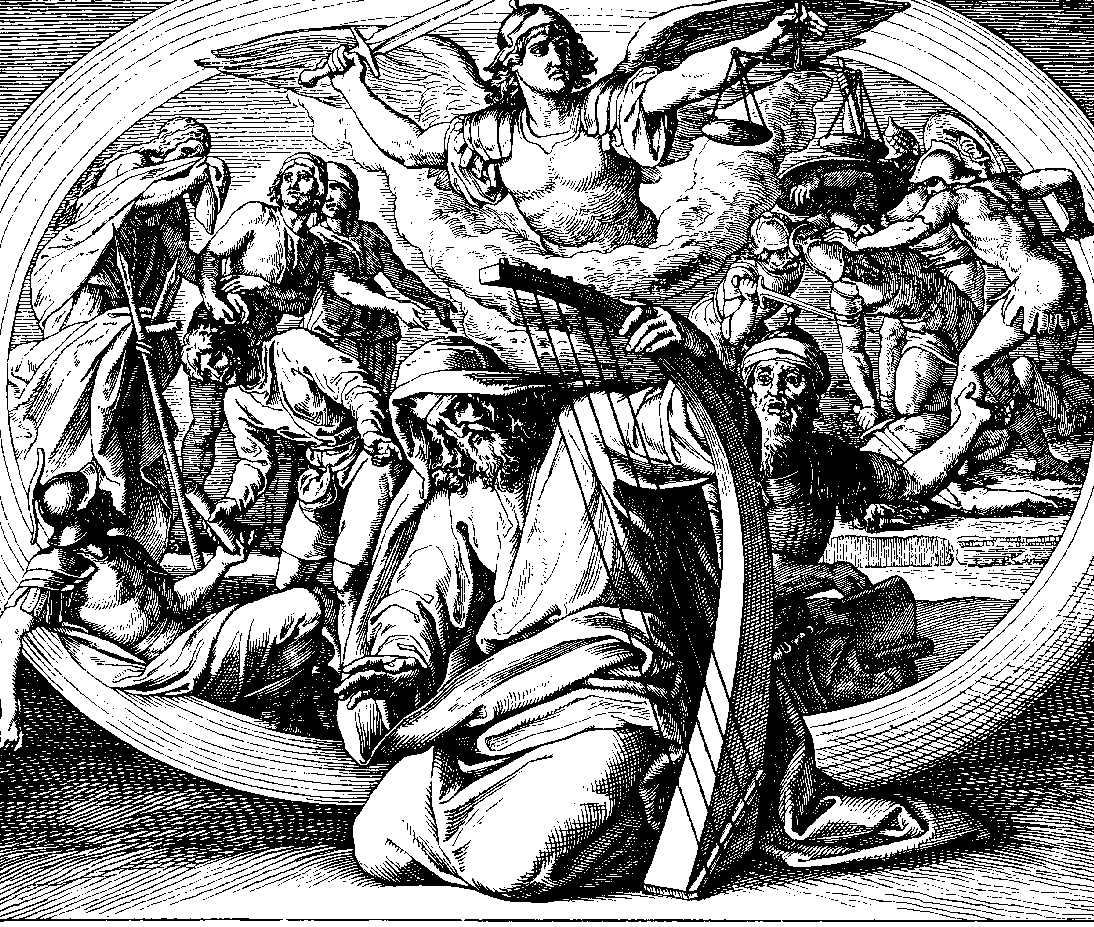
David is depicted giving a penitential psalm in this 1860 woodcut by Julius Schnorr von Karolsfeld

The Penitential Psalms or Psalms of Confession, so named in Cassiodorus's commentary of the 6th century AD, are the Psalms 6, 31, 37, 50, 101, 129, and 142 (6, 32, 38, 51, 102, 130, and 143 in the Hebrew numbering).

- Psalm VI – Domine, ne in furore tuo arguas me. (Pro octava). (O Lord, rebuke me not in thy indignation. (For the octave.))
- Psalm XXXI (32) – Beati quorum remissae sunt iniquitates. (Blessed are they whose iniquities are forgiven.)
- Psalm XXXVII (38) – Domine ne in furore tuo arguas me. (in rememorationem de sabbato). (O Lord, rebuke me not in thy indignation. (For a remembrance of the Sabbath.))
- Psalm L (51) – Miserere mei, Deus, secundum magnam misericordiam tuam. (Have mercy on me, O God, according to thy great mercy.)
- Psalm CI (102) – Domine, exaudi orationem meam, et clamor meus ad te veniat. (O Lord, hear my prayer, and let my cry come unto thee.)
- Psalm CXXIX (130) – De profundis clamavi ad te, Domine. (Out of the depths I have cried to thee, O Lord.)
- Psalm CXLII (143) – Domine, exaudi orationem meam: auribus percipe obsecrationem meam in veritate tua. (Hear, O Lord, my prayer: give ear to my supplication in thy truth.)

These psalms are expressive of sorrow for sin. Four were known as 'penitential psalms' by St. Augustine of Hippo in the early 5th century. The fiftieth Psalm (Miserere) was recited at the close of daily morning service in the early Church. Translations of the penitential psalms were undertaken by some of the greatest poets in Renaissance England, including Sir Thomas Wyatt, Henry Howard, Earl of Surrey, and Sir Philip Sidney. Before the suppression of the minor orders and tonsure in 1972 by Paul VI, the seven penitential psalms were assigned to new clerics after having been tonsured.

== Indulgence ==
With the bull Supremi omnipotentis Dei of 11 March 1572, Pope Saint Pius V granted an indulgence of 50 days for those who recite the penitential psalms.

The 2004 Enchiridion Indulgentiarum granted a partial indulgence to those who pray the penitential psalms in preparation for the Sacrament of Penance.

== Musical settings ==
Perhaps the most famous musical setting of all seven is by Orlande de Lassus, with his Psalmi Davidis poenitentiales of 1584. There are also settings by Andrea Gabrieli and by Giovanni Croce. The Croce pieces are unique in being settings of Italian sonnet-form translations of the Psalms by Francesco Bembo. These were widely distributed; they were translated into English and published in London as Musica Sacra; and were even translated (back) into Latin and published in Nürnberg as Septem Psalmi poenitentiales. William Byrd set all seven Psalms in English versions for three voices in his Songs of Sundrie Natures (1589). Settings of individual penitential psalms have been written by many composers. Well-known settings of the Miserere (Psalm 50/51) include those by Gregorio Allegri and Josquin des Prez; yet another is by Bach. Settings of the De profundis (Psalm 129/130) include two in the Renaissance by Josquin.
