= Triumph of the Cross (book) =

Book by Girolamo Savonarola

Triumphus crucis (English: The Triumph of the Cross) is a book by Girolamo Savonarola. It was written to show his feelings about the Catholic church and to refute accusations of heresy. The book was published in the 15th century. It was originally published in Latin but later translations have been made.

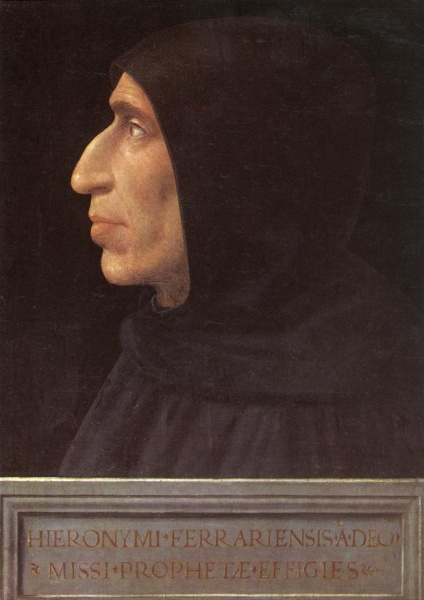
Girolamo Savonarola

== Structure ==
The book is divided into four books. The first book addresses the existence, nature and providence of God and attempts to prove the immortality of the soul of a man. The second book shows how the Christian faith is the true faith. The third book argues that there is nothing impossible in the mysteries of the Christian faith. The fourth book is devoted to an exposition of truth of the religion taught by Jesus.

In the book Girolamo Savonarola also explains why images were useful for retaining religious ideas in memory and for understanding their complexity.

== Translations ==
- The Triumph of the Cross; [Girolamo Savonarola]. Translated from the Latin, with notes and a biographical sketch, by O'Dell Travers Hill, F.R.G.S. London: Hodder and Stoughton, 1868
- The Triumph of the Cross; tr. ed., with intr., by J. Procter. London: Sands and Co., 1901 (John Procter was Provincial of the English Dominicans)
- The Truth of the Christian Faith, or, The triumph of the cross of Christ; by Hier. Savonarola; translated into English from the author's own Italian copy. Cambridge: printed by John Field, 1661 (Wing S780)
- The Verity of Christian Faith; Written by Hierome Savanorola [sic] of Ferrara. London: printed by R. Daniel (translation of book 2; Wing S781)
