= Johannes Lupi =

Franco-Flemish composer

Jean Leleu, most commonly known by the latinized version of his name, Johannes Lupi (c. 1506 – December 20, 1539), was a Franco-Flemish composer of the Renaissance. A representative of the generation after Josquin, he was a minor but skilled composer of polyphony who was mainly active in Cambrai.

== Life ==
His birthplace is unknown, but he served in Cambrai as a choirboy. He lived in Cambrai most of his life, only leaving to attend the university in Leuven, where he was present from 1522 until 1526. In 1527 he became master of the choirboys at the Cambrai Cathedral, a position which typically included housing and boarding them in addition to teaching them music. Several times he was fired from his job, but always re-hired again, usually for failing to discipline his charges but also for poor bookkeeping.

Lupi had an unnamed chronic illness which plagued him increasingly in the 1530s—he had to leave his position because of it in 1535—and which caused his early death.

== Style and influence ==
All of his surviving music is a cappella vocal. Only two masses survive, but he wrote numerous motets and chansons; the motets were collected and printed in 1542 by Pierre Attaingnant. One noteworthy work is his setting of Ergone conticuit, the lament on the death of Johannes Ockeghem written by Erasmus.

Stylistically his music was related to that of Nicolas Gombert, and showed the typical tendencies of the generation after Josquin with its densely textured polyphony and rich imitation, but Lupi remained extraordinarily sensitive to text-setting, being able to present clearly understandable words even in eight-part counterpoint. His chansons are particularly notable for their wide range of subject matter, from the serious to the bawdy.

Lupi is sometimes confused with several other musicians of the 16th century. Johannes Lupi was the name of two other obscure figures, neither of whom was a composer. One was active at Nivelles, the other at Antwerp, both in the first half of the century. In addition, there was a composer named Lupus, often referred to by contemporary musicologists as the "Italian Lupus", whose works survive in the Medici Codex; another composer named Lupus Hellinck, who may be the same as the "Italian Lupus"; and an entire family of musicians named Lupo. Of this family, only Ambrose Lupo, of Milan, was active in the early 16th century. Yet another Lupi, Didier Lupi Second, worked in Lyons around the middle of the century.

== References and further reading ==
- "Johannes Lupi," in The New Grove Dictionary of Music and Musicians, ed. Stanley Sadie. 20 vol. London, Macmillan Publishers Ltd., 1980. ISBN 1-56159-174-2
- Gustave Reese, Music in the Renaissance. New York, W.W. Norton & Co., 1954. ISBN 0-393-09530-4
