= Kentish Psalm =

The Kentish Psalm, also known as Kentish Psalm 50, is an Old English translation of and commentary on Psalm 51 (numbered 50 in the Septuagint). The poem is extant in a single manuscript, British Library MS Cotton Vespasian D.vi.

Psalm 51, also known as the Miserere ("have mercy") poem, was usually read as a plea by David, asking God for forgiveness for his affair with Bathsheba. The Kentish Psalm begins by recounting that traditional exegetical material, followed by "an expansive paraphrase" of the psalm, and ends with the poet's plea that God "forgive the poet and others just as he forgave David."

== Editions ==
- Foys, Martin et al. (ed.).Old English Poetry in Facsimile Project. Center for the History of Print and Digital Culture, University of Wisconsin-Madison, 2019-); poem edited in transcription and digital facsimile editions, with Modern English translation

== Bibliography ==
- Fox, Michael; Sharma, Manish (2012). "Introduction". In Michael, Fox (ed.). Old English Literature and the Old Testament. Manish Sharma. Toronto: U of Toronto P. pp. 3–24. ISBN 9780802098542.
