= Joseph Schnitzer =

Joseph Schnitzer (15 June 1859 in Lauingen – 1 December 1939 in Munich) was a theologian. He started teaching at the Ludwig-Maximilians-Universität München in 1902.

== Literary works ==
- Quellen und Forschungen zur Geschichte Savonarolas, 6 vols., 1902–1914
- Savonarola, 2 vols., 1924
