= Infelix ego =

1498 Latin meditation by Girolamo Savonarola

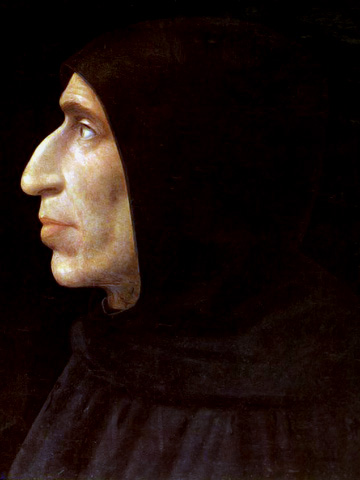
Girolamo Savonarola by Fra Bartolomeo, c. 1498.

Infelix ego ("Alas, wretch that I am") is a Latin meditation on the Miserere, Psalm 51 (Psalm 50 in Septuagint numbering), composed in prison by Girolamo Savonarola by 8 May 1498, after he was tortured on the rack, and two weeks before he was burned at the stake in the Piazza della Signoria in Florence on 23 May 1498. The prison authorities had spared only his right arm during the preliminary torture, so that Savonarola would be able to sign his confession: after doing so, and in a state of despair at not being strong enough to resist the pain of his prolonged torture, he wrote Infelix ego and a portion of a companion meditation, Tristitia obsedit me, on Psalm 30. He was executed before he was able to complete Tristitia obsedit me.

Savonarola was devastated at his own personal weakness in allowing the physical torture to overcome his will. After signing the confession, recanting his beliefs, and even denying that his prophecies had been sent by God Himself, he felt the need to prostrate himself before his God and beg for forgiveness. Penitential Psalm 51 (50 in the Septuagint numbering), the Miserere, provided the inspiration for his long and impassioned cry for mercy, a document which was to become highly influential in the years before the Reformation, especially in music history.

On 23 May 1498, Savonarola and two other friars who were his supporters were led out of their cells to the public square beside the Palazzo della Signoria. After their crimes were read to them, they were hanged in chains, and then burned, with the ashes being hurled into the Arno so that no relics would be recoverable by the crowds of the fanatical reformer's former supporters. Almost immediately, however, Savonarola's two meditations were in print: Laurentius de Rubeis produced one of the first prints, in Ferrara, Savonarola's birthplace, a town which continued to venerate him well into the 16th century.

Infelix ego begins, in translation:

Alas wretch that I am, destitute of all help, who have offended heaven and earth—where shall I go? Whither shall I turn myself? To whom shall I fly? Who will take pity on me? To heaven I dare not lift up my eyes, for I have deeply sinned against it; on earth I find no refuge, for I have been an offence to it. What therefore shall I do? Shall I despair? Far from it. God is merciful, my Saviour is loving. God alone therefore is my refuge ...

== Reception and influence ==
Infelix ego and its incomplete companion work Tristitia obsedit me spread quickly throughout Europe after Savonarola's execution. Of all his writings they became the most famous, appearing in 15 editions in Italy by 1500, and being translated into most European languages during the 16th century. Martin Luther was impressed by the pair of meditations, and wrote a preface to them in his 1523 publication of them in Wittenberg. His enthusiastic reception of Savonarola's writings, including Infelix ego, assisted in their suppression by the Roman Catholic Church. While Infelix ego was translated into Italian, French, German, Flemish, and Spanish, there were more editions of it in English than in any other language (21), all appearing between 1534 and 1578.

Savonarola's psalm meditations were among the few works of his not to be placed on the Index Librorum Prohibitorum, the Church's list of banned books, by Pope Paul IV in 1559, during the height of the Counter-Reformation. While the Dominican order was successful in preventing all of Savonarola's works being placed on the Index, the Church was able to shut down all printing of them in Italy after 1559, including Infelix ego. However, printing and translation of this work continued elsewhere in Europe.

Infelix ego was widely set by musicians. At first, it was alluded to secretly, rather than being directly set to music. Josquin des Prez's famous setting of the Miserere, written in Ferrara around 1503-1504, is an example of this, with its structure mirroring Savonarola's meditation, imitating its simplicity and phrasing, and including a refrain of "Miserere mei deus" after each verse, just as in Savonarola's meditation. Another composer who used a similar allusive technique was Lupus Hellinck, who wrote at least three compositions inspired by Savonarola, including two Miserere settings, both of which allude to the Josquin version, and one of which was itself used by French Protestant composer Claude Le Jeune for his own direct setting of Savonarola's other prison meditation, Tristitia obsedit me.

Some of the composers who set Infelix ego to music include Adrian Willaert (he was the first to set it directly); Cipriano de Rore; Nicola Vicentino; Simon Joly; Orlande de Lassus, working in Munich; Lassus's student Jacob Reiner; and in England, William Byrd. Three further English composers, William Hunnis, William Mundy, and Thomas Ravenscroft set the meditation in its English translation by William Hunnis, "Ah helples wretch".
