= Psalm 51 =

Book of Psalms, chapter 51

- "Have mercy upon me, O God"
- Penitential Psalm
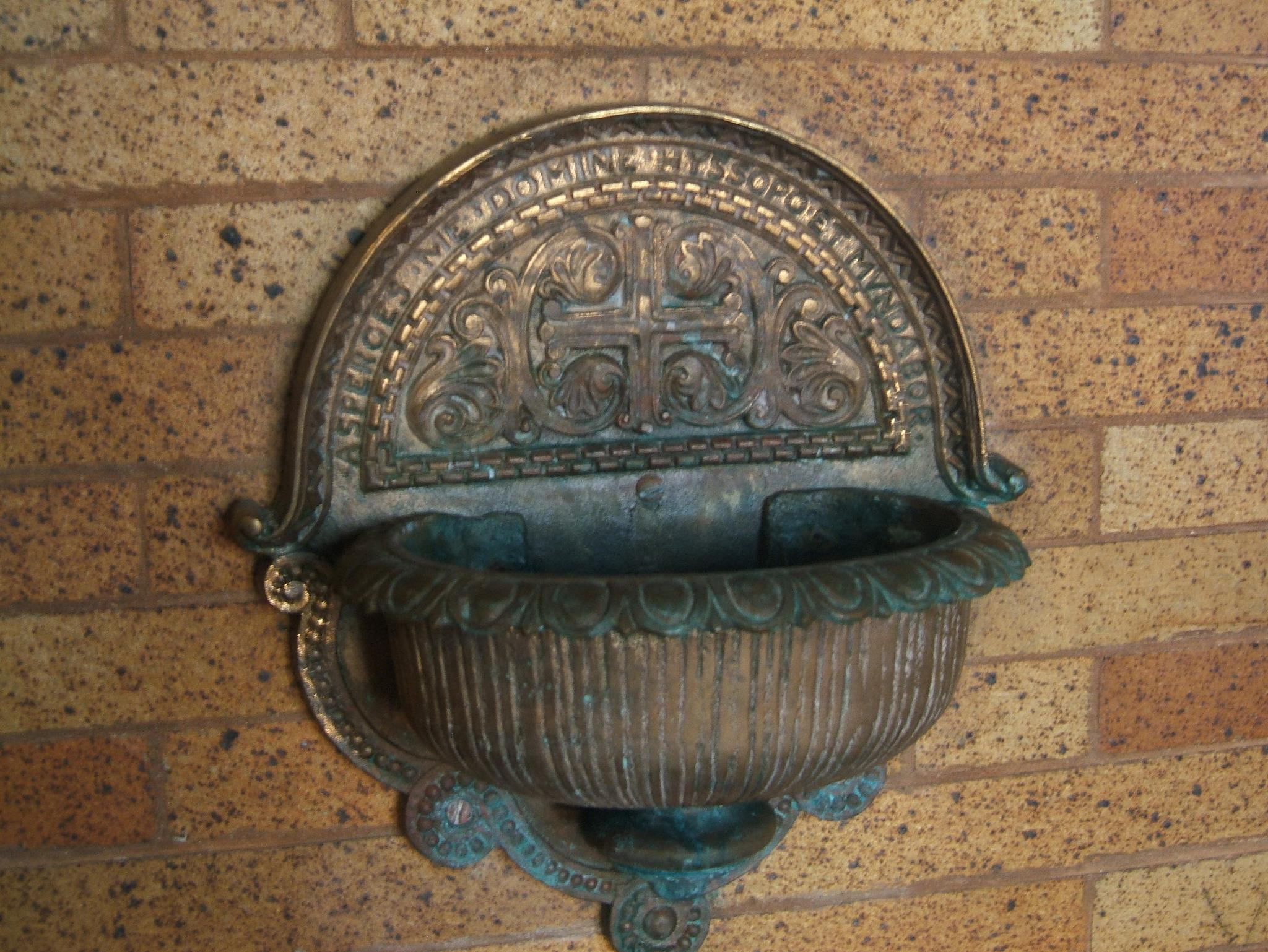
- Latin text on a holy water font: see verse 9 below
- Other name: Psalm 50; "Miserere mei, Deus"
- Language: Hebrew (original)

Psalm 51
- ← Psalm 50 Psalm 52 →
- Book: Book of Psalms
- Hebrew Bible part: Ketuvim
- Order in the Hebrew part: 1
- Category: Sifrei Emet
- Christian Bible part: Old Testament
- Order in the Christian part: 19

Psalm 51, one of the penitential psalms, is the 51st psalm of the Book of Psalms, beginning in English in the King James Version: "Have mercy upon me, O God". In the slightly different numbering system used in the Greek Septuagint and Latin Vulgate translations of the Hebrew Bible, this psalm is Psalm 50. In Latin, it is known as Miserere, (Ancient Greek: ἐλέησόν με ὁ θεός, romanized: eléēsón me ho Theós) in Ancient Greek: Ἥ Ἐλεήμων, romanized: Hḗ Eleḗmōn), especially in musical settings. The introduction in the text says that it was composed by David as a confession to God after he sinned with Bathsheba.

The psalm forms a regular part of Jewish, Catholic, Eastern Orthodox, Oriental Orthodox, and Protestant liturgies.

== Background and themes ==
Psalm 51 is based on the incident recorded in 2 Samuel, chapters 11–12. David's confession is regarded as a model for repentance in both Judaism and Christianity.

Midrash Tehillim states that one who acknowledges that they have sinned and is fearful and prays to God about it, as David did, will be forgiven. However, one who tries to ignore their sin will be punished by God. The Talmud, in Yoma 86b, cites verse 5 in the Hebrew (verse 3 in English versions—"My sin is always before me"—as a reminder to the penitent to maintain continual vigilance in the area in which they transgressed, even after they have confessed and been absolved.

Charles Spurgeon wrote that Psalm 51 is called "The Sinner's Guide", as it shows the sinner how to return to God's grace. Athanasius of Alexandria recommended that this chapter be recited each night by some of his disciples. According to James Montgomery Boice, this psalm was recited by both Thomas More and Lady Jane Grey at their executions.

Parallels between Psalm 51 and the Ancient Egyptian ritual text Opening of the mouth ceremony have been pointed out by scholar Benjamin Urrutia. These include:

- Mentions of ritual washing with special herbs (verses 2, 7)
- Restoration of broken bones (verse 8)
- "O Lord, open my lips" (verse 15)
- Sacrifices (verses 16, 17, 19)

== Uses ==
=== New Testament ===
Verse 4 is quoted in Romans 3:4.

=== Judaism ===
Several verses from Psalm 51 are regular parts of Jewish liturgy. Verses (in Hebrew) 3, 4, 9, 13, 19, 20, and 21 are said in Selichot. Verses 9, 12, and 19 are said during Tefillat Zakkah prior to the Kol Nidrei service on Yom Kippur eve. Verse 17, "O Lord, open my lips", is recited as a preface to the Amidah in all prayer services. Verse 20 is said by Ashkenazi Jews before the removal of the Sefer Torah from the ark on Shabbat and Yom Tov morning; it is also said in the Atah Horaisa ("You have been shown") prayer recited before opening the ark on Simchat Torah. In the Sephardi liturgy, Psalm 51 is one of the additional psalms recited on Yom Kippur night.

Verse 4 is part of the Ushpizin ceremony on Sukkot.

In the Siddur Avodas Yisroel, Psalm 51 is the Song of the Day for Shabbat Parah and Shabbat Ki Tavo. This psalm is also said on Wednesday nights after the recital of Aleinu in Maariv.

The entire psalm is part of Tikkun Chatzot. It is also recited as a prayer for forgiveness.

=== Eastern Orthodox Church ===
In the Eastern Orthodox Church, Psalm 50 (Psalm 51 in the Masoretic Text) is an important penitential Psalm that is read several times every day: at Compline, the Midnight Office, Matins, the Third Hour, and in many traditional rules for private morning and evening prayer. It is read silently by the priest at the Divine Liturgy, and it is also part of the rite of Holy Unction and the penitential service blessing a second marriage. Psalm 50/51 is part of the seventh Kathisma division of the Psalter, read at Matins on Tuesday mornings, as well as on Mondays and Thursdays during Lent, at the Third Hour and Matins, respectively.

=== Coptic Orthodox Church ===
In the Agpeya, the Coptic Church's book of hours, it is recited at every office throughout the day as a prayer of confession and repentance.

=== Catholic Church ===
In Western Christianity, Psalm 51 (using the Masoretic numbering) is also used liturgically.

In the Catholic Church, this psalm may be assigned by a priest to a penitent as a penance after Confession. Verse 7 of the psalm is traditionally sung as the priest sprinkles holy water over the congregation before Mass, in a rite known as the Asperges me, the first two words of the verse in Latin. For this, the priest uses an aspergillum, held in the right hand, while an acolyte holds a pail, also called aspersorium or situla. This reference lends a striking significance to the Mass as sacrifice, given that hyssop was used for the smearing of blood on the lintels at the first Passover.

In the Divine Office, it was traditionally said at Lauds on all ferias; the 1911 reform restricted this use to the ferias of Advent, Septuagesima, and Lent, most vigils, as well as the Sundays from Septuagesima Sunday to Palm Sunday inclusive and the ember days of Advent, Lent, and September. It is otherwise said as part of the weekly cycle on Wednesday at Matins. In the Liturgy of the Hours, it is prayed during Lauds (Morning Prayer) every Friday.

A section of verse 17 is often used as the invitatory antiphon in the Liturgy of the Hours.

Parts of Psalm 51 are used as a responsorial psalm in both the Revised Common Lectionary and the Roman Catholic Lectionary on Ash Wednesday and on other days.

==== Indulgence ====
In the Catholic Church, there is a 3-year indulgence for each recitation and a plenary indulgence if the prayer is recited for a month. The indulgence can also be spent in favor of the souls in Purgatory.

=== Book of Common Prayer ===
In the Church of England's Book of Common Prayer, Psalm 51 is appointed to be read on the morning of the tenth day of the month.

=== In English common law ===
Psalm 51 was used for centuries as a judicial test of reading ability. This practice began as a means by which a defendant could claim to be a clergyman, and thus be subject only to ecclesiastical courts and not subject to the power of civil courts. This was called pleading the benefit of clergy. The Biblical passage traditionally used for the literacy test was the first verse of Psalm 51. Thus, an illiterate person who had memorized this psalm could also claim the benefit of clergy, and Psalm 51 became known as the "neck-verse" because knowing it could save one's neck by transferring one's case from a secular court, where hanging was a likely sentence, to an ecclesiastical court, where both the methods of trial and the sentences given were more lenient, for example, a sentence of penance.

=== In medicine ===
It has been suggested that verse 7 "Purge me with hyssop, and I shall be clean:" is an early example of the medical use of Penicillium, the initial source of penicillin.

Possibly since the Middle Ages (and recorded in medical literature as early as the 16th century), the supplication and submission conveyed in the psalm has been linked by some common people with the pain and despair of a patient suffering from fecal vomiting, which received the vulgar name "Miserere mei" or "Miserere", inspired by verse 3 ("Miserere mei, Deus, secundum misericordiam tuam"). The condition is a common symptom of intestinal obstruction, which, without urgent surgical treatment, precedes the patient's death.

== Musical settings ==
Psalm 51 was a frequently used text in Catholic liturgical music before the Second Vatican Council. Most of the settings, which are often used at Tenebrae, are in a simple falsobordone style. During the Renaissance many composers wrote settings. The earliest known polyphonic setting, probably dating from the 1480s, is by Johannes Martini, a composer working in the Este court in Ferrara. The extended polyphonic setting by Josquin des Prez, probably written in 1503/1504 in Ferrara, was likely inspired by the prison meditation Infelix ego by Girolamo Savonarola, who had been burned at the stake just five years before. Later in the 16th century Orlande de Lassus wrote an elaborate setting as part of his Penitential Psalms, and Palestrina, Andrea Gabrieli, Giovanni Gabrieli, and Carlo Gesualdo also wrote settings.

Heinrich Schütz set Psalm 53 in a metred version in German, "Erbarm dich mein, o Herre Gott", SWV 150, as part of the Becker Psalter, first published in 1628. Antonio Vivaldi may have written one or more settings, but such composition(s) have been lost, with only two introductory motets remaining.

One of the best-known settings of Psalm 51 is the 17th century version by Roman School composer Gregorio Allegri. According to a popular story, Wolfgang Amadeus Mozart, aged only fourteen, heard the piece performed once, on April 11, 1770, and after going back to his lodging for the night was able to write out the entire score from memory. He went back a day or two later with his draft to correct some errors. That the final chorus comprises a nine-part harmony, with a five-voice choir and a four-voice choir singing simultaneously, underscores the prodigiousness of the young Mozart's musical genius. However, the only source of this story is a letter written by Leopold Mozart to his wife on April 14, 1770: and doubt has been cast on it, as Allegri's setting was known in London, which Mozart had visited in 1764–65.

The piece is also noteworthy in having been transcribed erroneously by William Smith Rockstro as having numerous high Cs in the treble part. This interpolated version is nevertheless extremely popular and widely recorded.

Four settings were written by Marc-Antoine Charpentier (H.157, H.173, H.219, H.193-H.193 a). Louis-Nicolas Clérambault set one Miserere for soloists, chorus and continuo (organ) (date unknown). Charles-Hubert Gervais set one Miserere (1723–1744), Sébastien de Brossard set one Miserere in 1688–89, André Campra set one Miserere in 1726 and many by Michel-Richard de Lalande (S.15, S.27, S.87, S.41/2, S.32/17, S.6/3), François Giroust, set 5 Miserere, Costanzo Festa, Johann Sebastian Bach, Giovanni Battista Pergolesi and Saverio Selecchy. Jan Dismas Zelenka wrote two elaborate settings (ZWV 56 and ZWV 57).

Modern composers who have written notable settings of Psalm 51 include Michael Nyman, Arvo Pärt, and James MacMillan. References in secular popular music include the Antestor song "Mercy Lord", from the album Martyrium (1994), "In Manus Tuas" (Salvation 2003) by the group Funeral Mist, "White As Snow" (Winter 2008) by Jon Foreman, the song "Restore To Me" by Mac Powell Begin 2024 the Dutch women composer Annemieke Lustenhouwer completed a version for mixed four-part choir with harp accompaniment.

Verses 12–13 have been set to music as a popular Jewish inspirational song. Titled Lev Tahor ("A pure heart"), this song is commonly sung at Seudah Shlishit (the third Shabbat meal).

== Text ==
The following table shows the Hebrew text of the Psalm with vowels, alongside the Koine Greek text in the Septuagint and the English translation from the King James Version. Note that the meaning can slightly differ between these versions, as the Septuagint and the Masoretic Text come from different textual traditions. (Note: A 1917 translation directly from Hebrew to English by the Jewish Publication Society can be found here or here, and an 1844 translation directly from the Septuagint by L. C. L. Brenton can be found here. Both translations are in the public domain.) In the Septuagint, this psalm is numbered Psalm 50.

#	Hebrew	English	Greek
(Note: In the Jewish verse numbering, the ascription of this psalm is verses 1 and 2, and the rest of the psalm begins from verse 3. However, the Christian verse numbering does not count the ascription.)	לַמְנַצֵּ֗חַ מִזְמ֥וֹר לְדָוִֽד׃	(To the chief Musician, A Psalm of David,	Εἰς τὸ τέλος· ψαλμὸς τῷ Δαυΐδ
	בְּֽבוֹא־אֵ֭לָיו נָתָ֣ן הַנָּבִ֑יא כַּאֲשֶׁר־בָּ֝֗א אֶל־בַּת־שָֽׁבַע׃	when Nathan the prophet came unto him, after he had gone in to Bathsheba.)	ἐν τῷ ἐλθεῖν πρὸς αὐτὸν Νάθαν τὸν προφήτην, ἡνίκα εἰσῆλθε πρὸς Βηρσαβεέ. -
1	חׇנֵּ֣נִי אֱלֹהִ֣ים כְּחַסְדֶּ֑ךָ כְּרֹ֥ב רַ֝חֲמֶ֗יךָ מְחֵ֣ה פְשָׁעָֽי׃	Have mercy upon me, O God, according to thy lovingkindness: according unto the multitude of thy tender mercies blot out my transgressions.	ΕΛΕΗΣΟΝ με, ὁ Θεός, κατὰ τὸ μέγα ἔλεός σου καὶ κατὰ τὸ πλῆθος τῶν οἰκτιρμῶν σου ἐξάλειψον τὸ ἀνόμημά μου·
2	(הרבה) [הֶ֭רֶב] כַּבְּסֵ֣נִי מֵעֲוֺנִ֑י וּֽמֵחַטָּאתִ֥י טַהֲרֵֽנִי׃	Wash me thoroughly from mine iniquity, and cleanse me from my sin.	ἐπὶ πλεῖον πλῦνόν με ἀπὸ τῆς ἀνομίας μου καὶ ἀπὸ τῆς ἁμαρτίας μου καθάρισόν με.
3	כִּֽי־פְ֭שָׁעַי אֲנִ֣י אֵדָ֑ע וְחַטָּאתִ֖י נֶגְדִּ֣י תָמִֽיד׃	For I acknowledge my transgressions: and my sin is ever before me.	ὅτι τὴν ἀνομίαν μου ἐγὼ γινώσκω, καὶ ἡ ἁμαρτία μου ἐνώπιόν μού ἐστι διαπαντός.
4	לְךָ֤ לְבַדְּךָ֨ ׀ חָטָאתִי֮ וְהָרַ֥ע בְּעֵינֶ֗יךָ עָ֫שִׂ֥יתִי לְ֭מַעַן תִּצְדַּ֥ק בְּדׇבְרֶ֗ךָ תִּזְכֶּ֥ה בְשׇׁפְטֶֽךָ׃	Against thee, thee only, have I sinned, and done this evil in thy sight: that thou mightest be justified when thou speakest, and be clear when thou judgest.	σοὶ μόνῳ ἥμαρτον καὶ τὸ πονηρὸν ἐνώπιόν σου ἐποίησα, ὅπως ἂν δικαιωθῇς ἐν τοῖς λόγοις σου, καὶ νικήσῃς ἐν τῷ κρίνεσθαί σε.
5	הֵן־בְּעָו֥וֹן חוֹלָ֑לְתִּי וּ֝בְחֵ֗טְא יֶחֱמַ֥תְנִי אִמִּֽי׃	Behold, I was shapen in iniquity; and in sin did my mother conceive me.	ἰδοὺ γὰρ ἐν ἀνομίαις συνελήφθην, καὶ ἐν ἁμαρτίαις ἐκίσσησέ με ἡ μήτηρ μου.
6	הֵן־אֱ֭מֶת חָפַ֣צְתָּ בַטֻּח֑וֹת וּ֝בְסָתֻ֗ם חׇכְמָ֥ה תוֹדִיעֵֽנִי׃	Behold, thou desirest truth in the inward parts: and in the hidden part thou shalt make me to know wisdom.	ἰδοὺ γὰρ ἀλήθειαν ἠγάπησας, τὰ ἄδηλα καὶ τὰ κρύφια τῆς σοφίας σου ἐδήλωσάς μοι.
7	תְּחַטְּאֵ֣נִי בְאֵז֣וֹב וְאֶטְהָ֑ר תְּ֝כַבְּסֵ֗נִי וּמִשֶּׁ֥לֶג אַלְבִּֽין׃	Purge me with hyssop, and I shall be clean: wash me, and I shall be whiter than snow.	ῥαντιεῖς με ὑσσώπῳ, καὶ καθαρισθήσομαι, πλυνεῖς με, καὶ ὑπὲρ χιόνα λευκανθήσομαι.
8	תַּ֭שְׁמִיעֵנִי שָׂשׂ֣וֹן וְשִׂמְחָ֑ה תָּ֝גֵ֗לְנָה עֲצָמ֥וֹת דִּכִּֽיתָ׃	Make me to hear joy and gladness; that the bones which thou hast broken may rejoice.	ἀκουτιεῖς μοι ἀγαλλίασιν καὶ εὐφροσύνην, ἀγαλλιάσονται ὀστέα τεταπεινωμένα.
9	הַסְתֵּ֣ר פָּ֭נֶיךָ מֵחֲטָאָ֑י וְֽכׇל־עֲוֺ֖נֹתַ֣י מְחֵֽה׃	Hide thy face from my sins, and blot out all mine iniquities.	ἀπόστρεψον τὸ πρόσωπόν σου ἀπὸ τῶν ἁμαρτιῶν μου καὶ πάσας τὰς ἀνομίας μου ἐξάλειψον.
10	לֵ֣ב טָ֭הוֹר בְּרָא־לִ֣י אֱלֹהִ֑ים וְר֥וּחַ נָ֝כ֗וֹן חַדֵּ֥שׁ בְּקִרְבִּֽי׃	Create in me a clean heart, O God; and renew a right spirit within me.	καρδίαν καθαρὰν κτίσον ἐν ἐμοί, ὁ Θεός, καὶ πνεῦμα εὐθὲς ἐγκαίνισον ἐν τοῖς ἐγκάτοις μου.
11	אַל־תַּשְׁלִיכֵ֥נִי מִלְּפָנֶ֑יךָ וְר֥וּחַ קׇ֝דְשְׁךָ֗ אַל־תִּקַּ֥ח מִמֶּֽנִּי׃	Cast me not away from thy presence; and take not thy holy spirit from me.	μὴ ἀποῤῥίψῃς με ἀπὸ τοῦ προσώπου σου καὶ τὸ πνεῦμά σου τὸ ἅγιον μὴ ἀντανέλῃς ἀπ᾿ ἐμοῦ.
12	הָשִׁ֣יבָה לִּ֭י שְׂשׂ֣וֹן יִשְׁעֶ֑ךָ וְר֖וּחַ נְדִיבָ֣ה תִסְמְכֵֽנִי׃	Restore unto me the joy of thy salvation; and uphold me with thy free spirit.	ἀπόδος μοι τὴν ἀγαλλίασιν τοῦ σωτηρίου σου καὶ πνεύματι ἡγεμονικῷ στήριξόν με.
13	אֲלַמְּדָ֣ה פֹשְׁעִ֣ים דְּרָכֶ֑יךָ וְ֝חַטָּאִ֗ים אֵלֶ֥יךָ יָשֽׁוּבוּ׃	Then will I teach transgressors thy ways; and sinners shall be converted unto thee.	διδάξω ἀνόμους τὰς ὁδούς σου, καὶ ἀσεβεῖς ἐπὶ σὲ ἐπιστρέψουσι.
14	הַצִּ֘ילֵ֤נִי מִדָּמִ֨ים ׀ אֱֽלֹהִ֗ים אֱלֹהֵ֥י תְשׁוּעָתִ֑י תְּרַנֵּ֥ן לְ֝שׁוֹנִ֗י צִדְקָתֶֽךָ׃	Deliver me from bloodguiltiness, O God, thou God of my salvation: and my tongue shall sing aloud of thy righteousness.	ρῦσαί με ἐξ αἱμάτων, ὁ Θεὸς ὁ Θεὸς τῆς σωτηρίας μου· ἀγαλλιάσεται ἡ γλῶσσά μου τὴν δικαιοσύνην σου.
15	אֲ֭דֹנָי שְׂפָתַ֣י תִּפְתָּ֑ח וּ֝פִ֗י יַגִּ֥יד תְּהִלָּתֶֽךָ׃	O Lord, open thou my lips; and my mouth shall shew forth thy praise.	Κύριε, τὰ χείλη μου ἀνοίξεις, καὶ τὸ στόμα μου ἀναγγελεῖ τὴν αἴνεσίν σου.
16	כִּ֤י ׀ לֹא־תַחְפֹּ֣ץ זֶ֣בַח וְאֶתֵּ֑נָה ע֝וֹלָ֗ה לֹ֣א תִרְצֶֽה׃	For thou desirest not sacrifice; else would I give it: thou delightest not in burnt offering.	ὅτι εἰ ἠθέλησας θυσίαν, ἔδωκα ἄν· ὁλοκαυτώματα οὐκ εὐδοκήσεις.
17	זִ֥בְחֵ֣י אֱלֹהִים֮ ר֤וּחַ נִשְׁבָּ֫רָ֥ה לֵב־נִשְׁבָּ֥ר וְנִדְכֶּ֑ה אֱ֝לֹהִ֗ים לֹ֣א תִבְזֶֽה׃	The sacrifices of God are a broken spirit: a broken and a contrite heart, O God, thou wilt not despise.	θυσία τῷ Θεῷ πνεῦμα συντετριμμένον, καρδίαν συντετριμμένην καὶ τεταπεινωμένην ὁ Θεὸς οὐκ ἐξουδενώσει.
18	הֵיטִ֣יבָה בִ֭רְצוֹנְךָ אֶת־צִיּ֑וֹן תִּ֝בְנֶ֗ה חוֹמ֥וֹת יְרוּשָׁלָֽ͏ִם׃	Do good in thy good pleasure unto Zion: build thou the walls of Jerusalem.	ἀγάθυνον, Κύριε, ἐν τῇ εὐδοκίᾳ σου τὴν Σιών, καὶ οἰκοδομηθήτω τὰ τείχη ῾Ιερουσαλήμ·
19	אָ֤ז תַּחְפֹּ֣ץ זִבְחֵי־צֶ֭דֶק עוֹלָ֣ה וְכָלִ֑יל אָ֤ז יַעֲל֖וּ עַל־מִזְבַּחֲךָ֣ פָרִֽים׃	Then shalt thou be pleased with the sacrifices of righteousness, with burnt offering and whole burnt offering: then shall they offer bullocks upon thine altar.	τότε εὐδοκήσεις θυσίαν δικαιοσύνης, ἀναφορὰν καὶ ὁλοκαυτώματα· τότε ἀνοίσουσιν ἐπὶ τὸ θυσιαστήριόν σου μόσχους.

=== Verse 17 ===
The sacrifices of God are a broken spirit; a broken and a contrite heart, O God, Thou wilt not despise.

— Psalm 51:19 (verse 17 in many modern English translations)

Verse 19 in the Hebrew (verse 17 in many modern English translations) suggests that God desires a "broken and contrite heart" more than he does sacrificial offerings. The idea of using brokenheartedness as a way to reconnect to God was emphasized in numerous teachings by Rebbe Nachman of Breslov. In Sichot HaRan #41, Nachman taught: "It would be very good to be brokenhearted all day. But for the average person, this can easily degenerate into depression. You should therefore set aside some time each day for heartbreak. You should isolate yourself with a broken heart before God for a given time. But the rest of the day you should be joyful".

== See also ==
- Benefit of clergy#The Miserere
- Kentish Psalm
- Penitential Psalms

== Bibliography ==
- John Caldwell: "Miserere", Stanley Boorman, "Sources: MS", Stanley Sadie, "Mozart, Wolfgang Amadeus"; Grove Music Online, ed. L. Macy (Accessed November 25, 2006), (subscription required)
- Patrick Macey, Bonfire Songs: Savonarola's Musical Legacy. Oxford, Clarendon Press. 1998. ISBN 0-19-816669-9
