= Michele Savonarola =

Italian physician, humanist and historian

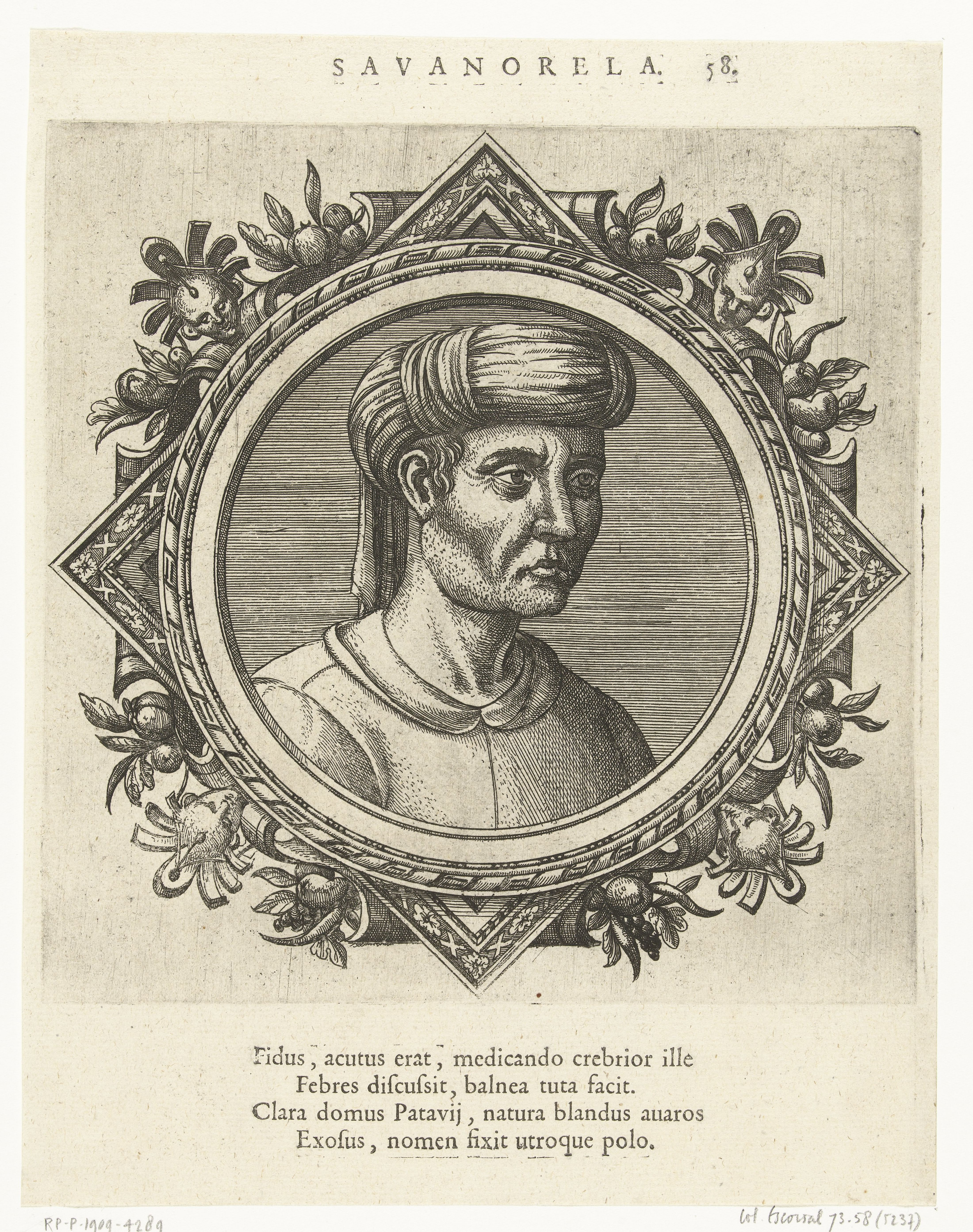
Michele Savonarola

Michele Savonarola (1385 - c.1466) was an Italian physician, humanist, and historian. He was professor of practical medicine at Padua before in 1440 becoming court physician to the House of Este at Ferrara. His grandson was the Dominican Order friar and preacher Girolamo Savonarola.

== Biography ==
Savonarola came from a noble family and served as a soldier before studying medicine. In 1434, he became a professor of medicine in Padua and, from 1440, he was the personal physician to Niccolò III d'Este in Ferrara, where he also held a professorship.

Savonarola was the author of a widely circulated medical textbook, Practica Maior, first printed in 1479, as well as an early textbook on gynaecology and pediatrics. Savonarola's treatise on gynecology was the basis for Eucharius Rösslin's German-language midwifery textbook, Der Rosengarten (The Rose Garden, Strasbourg, Haguenau, 1513). Savonarola was influenced by the Neapolitan physician Francesco da Piedimonte, who died in 1320. A proto-chemist, he opposed alchemists' gold-making practices, studied pharmacy and botany. He had two sons, Giovanni and Niccolò. The latter was the father of Girolamo Savonarola.

== Works ==
- Practica maior
- De regimine pregnantium
- De tutte cose se magnano
- De balneis
- Speculum phisionomie
- Del felice progresso
- De nuptiis Batibecho et Seraboca
