= Girolamo Savonarola =

De facto ruler of Florence from 1494 to 1498; Dominican friar and reformer

The Reverend Girolamo Savonarola OP
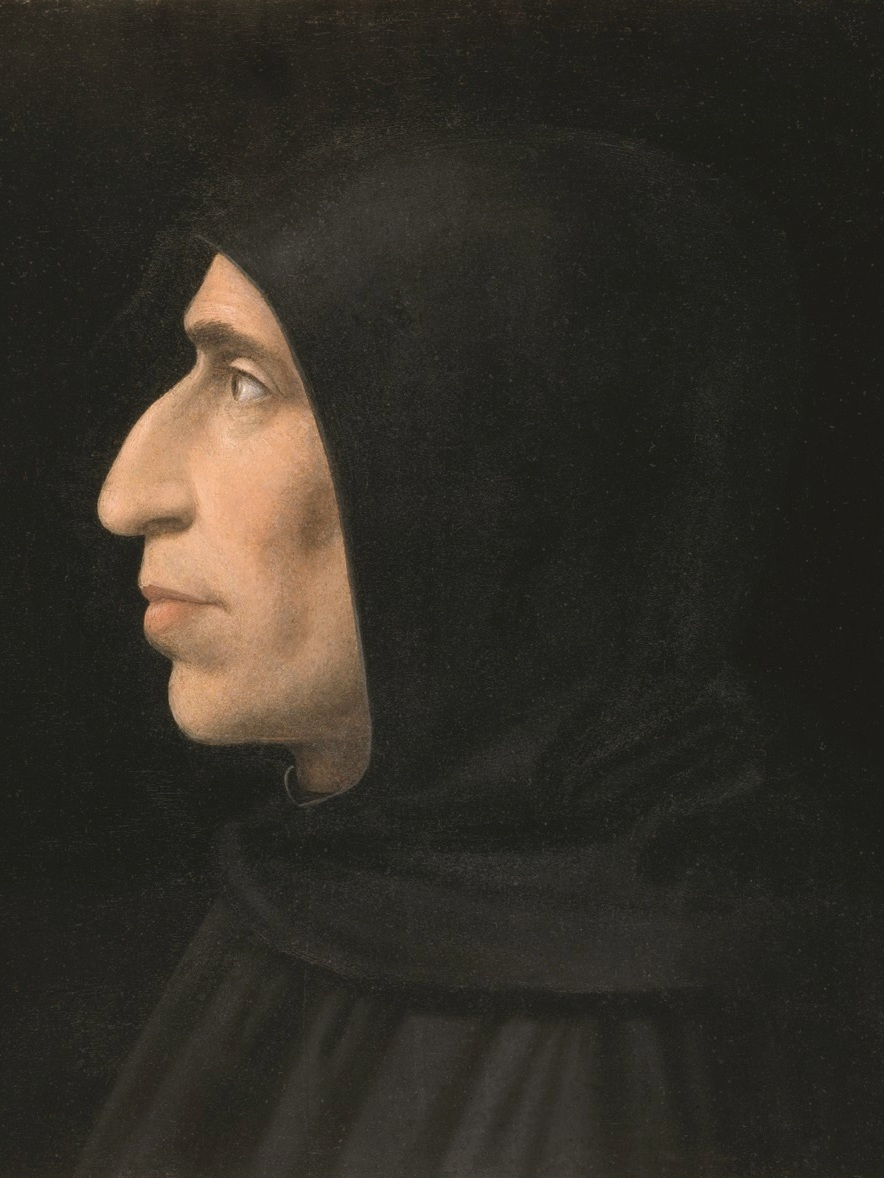
- Girolamo Savonarola by Fra Bartolomeo, c. 1498, Museo di San Marco, Florence

De facto Ruler of Florence
- Reign: November 1494 – 18 March 1498
- Predecessor: Piero de' Medici
- Successor: Piero Soderini
- Born: 21 September 1452; Ferrara, Duchy of Ferrara
- Died: 23 May 1498 (aged 45); Florence, Republic of Florence
- Cause of death: Execution
- Father: Niccolò di Michele dalla Savonarola
- Mother: Elena Bonacolsi

Philosophical work
- Era: Renaissance
- Notable ideas: Democratic theocracy

Girolamo Savonarola, OP (UK: /ˌsævɒnəˈroʊlə/, US: /ˌsævən-, səˌvɒn-/; Italian: [dʒiˈrɔːlamo savonaˈrɔːla]; 21 September 1452 – 23 May 1498), also referred to as Jerome Savonarola, was an Italian ascetic Dominican friar from Ferrara and a preacher active in Renaissance Florence. He became known for his prophecies of civic glory, his advocacy of the destruction of secular art and culture, and his calls for Christian renewal. He denounced clerical corruption, despotic rule, and the exploitation of the poor.

In September 1494, when King Charles VIII of France invaded Italy and threatened Florence, Savonarola's prophecies seemed on the verge of fulfillment. While the friar intervened with the French king, the Florentines expelled the ruling Medicis and at Savonarola's urging established a "well received" republic, effectively under Savonarola's control. Declaring that Florence would be the New Jerusalem, the world centre of Christianity and "richer, more powerful, more glorious than ever", he instituted an extreme moralistic campaign, enlisting the active help of Florentine youth.

In 1495, when Florence refused to join Pope Alexander VI's Holy League against the French, the Vatican summoned Savonarola to Rome. He disobeyed, and further defied the pope by preaching under a ban, highlighting his campaign for reform with processions, bonfires of the vanities, and pious theatricals. In retaliation, Pope Alexander excommunicated Savonarola in May 1497 and threatened to place Florence under an interdict. A trial by fire proposed by a rival Florentine preacher in April 1498 to test Savonarola's divine mandate turned into a fiasco, and popular opinion turned against him. Savonarola and two of his supporting friars were imprisoned. On 23 May 1498, Church and civil authorities condemned, hanged, and burned the bodies of the three friars in the main square of Florence.

Savonarola's devotees, the Piagnoni, kept his cause of republican freedom and religious reform alive well into the following century. Pope Julius II allegedly considered his canonization. The Medici—restored to power in Florence in 1512 with the help of the papacy—eventually fatally weakened the Piagnoni movement. Some early Protestants, including Martin Luther himself, have regarded Savonarola as a vital precursor to the Protestant Reformation.

== Early years ==
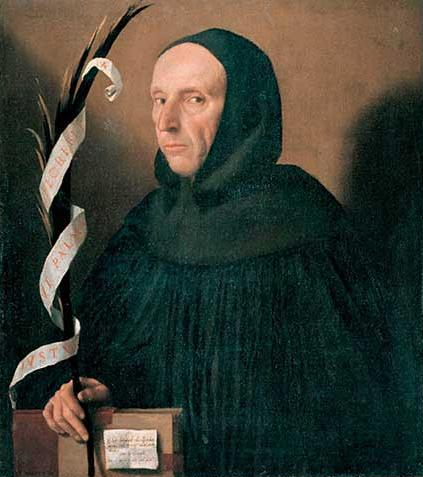
Posthumous portrait of Savonarola by Moretto da Brescia, c. 1524

Savonarola was born on 21 September 1452 in Ferrara to Niccolò di Michele and Elena. His father, Niccolò, was born in Ferrara to a family originally from Padua; his mother, Elena, claimed a lineage from the Bonacossi family of Mantua. She and Niccolò had seven children, of whom Girolamo was third. His grandfather, Michele Savonarola, a noted and successful physician and polymath, oversaw Girolamo's education. The family amassed a great deal of wealth from Michele's medical practice. After his grandfather's death in 1468 Savonarola may have attended the public school run by Battista Guarino, son of Guarino da Verona, where he would have received his introduction to the classics as well as to the poetry and writings of Petrarch, father of Renaissance humanism. Earning an arts degree at the University of Ferrara, he prepared to enter medical school, following in his grandfather's footsteps. At some point, however, he abandoned his career intentions.

In his early poems he expresses his preoccupation with the state of the Church and of the world. He began to write poetry of an apocalyptic bent, notably "On the Ruin of the World" (1472) and "On the Ruin of the Church" (1475), in which he singled out the papal court at Rome for special obloquy. About the same time he seems to have been thinking about a life in religion. As he later told his biographer, a sermon he heard by a preacher in Faenza persuaded him to abandon the world. Most of his biographers reject or ignore the account of his younger brother and follower, Maurelio (later fra Mauro), that in his youth Girolamo had been spurned by a neighbour, Laudomia Strozzi, to whom he had proposed marriage. True or not, in a letter he wrote to his father when he left home to join the Dominican Order he hints at being troubled by desires of the flesh. There is also a story that on the eve of his departure he dreamed that he was cleansed of such thoughts by a shower of icy water, which prepared him for the ascetic life. In the unfinished treatise he left behind, later called "De contemptu Mundi" or "On Contempt for the World", he calls upon readers to fly from this world of adultery, sodomy, murder, and envy.

Savonarola studied Augustine and Thomas Aquinas. He also studied the scriptures and memorised parts. On 25 April 1475, Savonarola went to Bologna, where he knocked on the door of the Friary of San Domenico, of the Order of Friars Preacher, and asked to be admitted. As he told his father in his farewell letter, he wanted to become a knight of Christ.

== Friar ==
In the convent, Savonarola took the vow of obedience proper to his order, and after a year was ordained to the priesthood. He studied Scripture, logic, Aristotelian philosophy and Thomistic theology in the Dominican studium, practised preaching to his fellow friars, and engaged in disputations. He then matriculated in the theological faculty to prepare for an advanced degree. Even as he continued to write devotional works and to deepen his spiritual life, he was openly critical of what he perceived as the decline in convent austerity. In 1478 his studies were interrupted when he was sent to the Dominican priory of Santa Maria degli Angeli in Ferrara as assistant master of novices. The assignment might have been a normal, temporary break from the academic routine, but in Savonarola's case, it was a turning point. One explanation is that he had alienated certain of his superiors, particularly fra Vincenzo Bandelli, or Bandello, a professor at the studium and future master general of the Dominicans, who resented the young friar's opposition to modifying the Order's rules against the ownership of property.

In 1482, instead of returning to Bologna to resume his studies, Savonarola was assigned as lector, or teacher, in the Convent of San Marco in Florence. In San Marco, fra Girolamo (Savonarola) taught logic to the novices, wrote instructional manuals on ethics, logic, philosophy and government, composed devotional works, and prepared his sermons for local congregations. As he recorded in his notes, his preaching was not altogether successful. Florentines were put off by his foreign-sounding Ferrarese speech, his strident voice and (especially to those who valued humanist rhetoric) his inelegant style.

While waiting for a friend in the Convent of San Giorgio, he was studying Scripture when he suddenly conceived "about seven reasons" why the Church was about to be scourged and renewed. He broached these apocalyptic themes in San Gimignano, where he went as Lenten preacher in 1485 and again in 1486. A year later, when he left San Marco for a new assignment, he had said nothing of his "San Giorgio revelations" in Florence.

== Preacher ==
For the next several years, Savonarola lived as an itinerant preacher with a message of repentance and reform in the cities and convents of north Italy. As his letters to his mother and his writings show, his confidence and sense of mission grew along with his widening reputation. In 1490, he was reassigned to San Marco. It seems that this was due to the initiative of the humanist philosopher-prince, Giovanni Pico della Mirandola, who had heard Savonarola in a formal disputation in Reggio Emilia and been impressed with his learning and piety. Pico was in trouble with the Church for some of his unorthodox philosophical ideas (the famous "900 theses") and was living under the protection of Lorenzo the Magnificent, the Medici de facto ruler of Florence. To have Savonarola beside him as a spiritual counsellor, he persuaded Lorenzo that the friar would bring prestige to the convent of San Marco and its Medici patrons. After some delay, apparently due to the interference of his former professor fra Vincenzo Bandelli, now Vicar General of the Order, Lorenzo succeeded in bringing Savonarola back to Florence, where he arrived in May or June of that year.

== Prophet ==
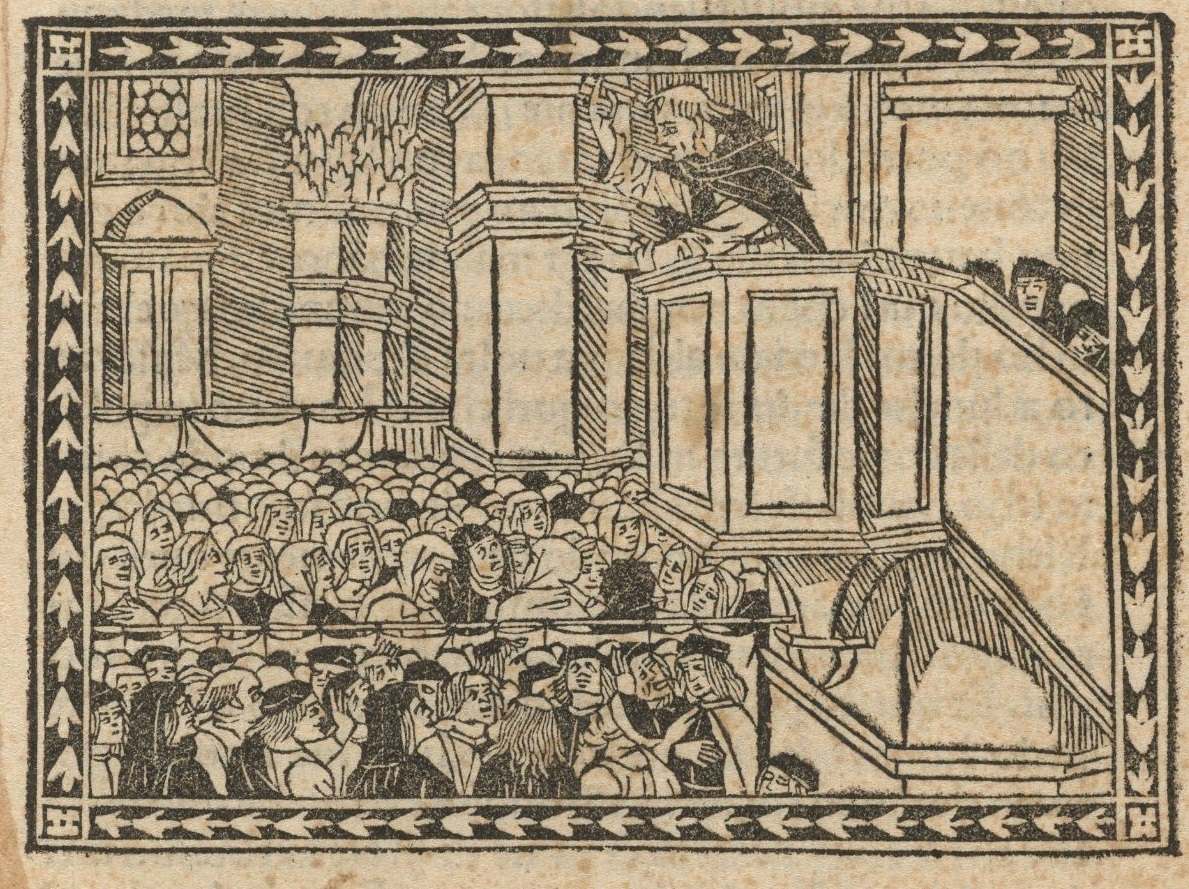
Illustration from Compendio di revelatione, 1496, by Savonarola

Savonarola preached on the First Epistle of John and on the Book of Revelation, drawing such large crowds that he eventually moved to the cathedral. Without mentioning names, he made pointed allusions to tyrants who usurped the freedom of the people, and he excoriated their allies, the rich and powerful who neglected and exploited the poor. Complaining of the evil lives of a corrupt clergy, he now called for repentance and renewal before the arrival of a divine scourge. Scoffers dismissed him as an over-excited zealot and "preacher of the desperate" and sneered at his growing band of followers as Piagnoni—"Weepers" or "Wailers", an epithet they adopted. In 1492 Savonarola warned of "the Sword of the Lord over the earth quickly and soon" and envisioned terrible tribulations to Rome. Around 1493 (these sermons have not survived) he began to prophesy that a New Cyrus was coming over the mountains to begin the renewal of the Church.

In September 1494 King Charles VIII of France crossed the Alps with a formidable army, throwing Italy into political chaos. Many viewed the arrival of King Charles as proof of Savonarola's gift of prophecy. Charles advanced on Florence, sacking Tuscan strongholds and threatening to punish the city for refusing to support his expedition. As the populace took to the streets to expel Piero the Unfortunate, Lorenzo de' Medici's son and successor, Savonarola led a delegation to the camp of the French king in mid-November 1494. He pressed Charles to spare Florence and enjoined him to take up his divinely appointed role as the reformer of the Church. After a short, tense occupation of the city, and another intervention by fra Girolamo (as well as the promise of a huge subsidy), the French resumed their journey southward on 28 November 1494. Savonarola now declared that by answering his call to penitence, the Florentines had begun to build a new Ark of Noah which had saved them from the waters of the divine flood. Even more sensational was the message in his sermon of 10 December:

I announce this good news to the city, that Florence will be more glorious, richer, more powerful than she has ever been; First, glorious in the sight of God as well as of men: and you, O Florence will be the reformation of all Italy, and from here the renewal will begin and spread everywhere, because this is the navel of Italy. Your counsels will reform all by the light and grace that God will give you. Second, O Florence, you will have innumerable riches, and God will multiply all things for you. Third, you will spread your empire, and thus you will have power temporal and spiritual.

== Reformer ==
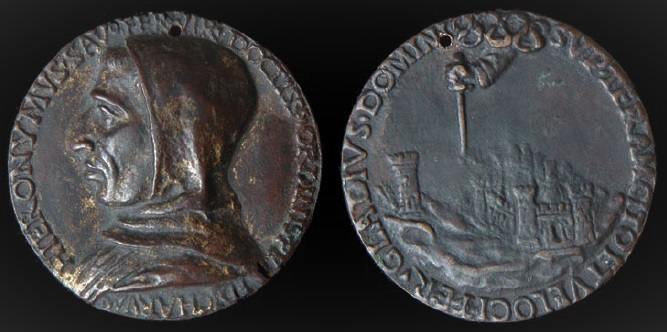
Italian Renaissance Medal of Savonarola by Fiorentino. Electrotype, obverse.

With Savonarola's advice and support (as a non-citizen and cleric he was ineligible to hold office), a Savonarolan political "party", dubbed "the Frateschi", took shape and steered the friar's program through the councils. The oligarchs most compromised by their service to the Medici were barred from office. A new constitution enfranchised the artisan class, opened minor civic offices to selection by lot, and granted every citizen in good standing the right to a vote in a new parliament, the Consiglio Maggiore, or Great Council. At Savonarola's urging, the Frateschi government, after months of debate, passed a "Law of Appeal" to limit the longtime practice of using exile and capital punishment as factional weapons. Savonarola declared a new era of "universal peace". On 13 January 1495 he preached his great Renovation Sermon to a huge audience in the cathedral, recalling that he had begun prophesying in Florence four years earlier, although the divine light had come to him "more than fifteen, maybe twenty years ago". He now claimed that he had predicted the deaths of Lorenzo de' Medici and of Pope Innocent VIII in 1492 and the coming of the sword to Italy—the invasion of King Charles of France. As he had foreseen, God had chosen Florence, "the navel of Italy", as his favourite and he repeated: if the city continued to do penance and began the work of renewal it would have riches, glory and power.

If the Florentines had any doubt that the promise of worldly power and glory had heavenly sanction, Savonarola emphasised this in a sermon of 1 April 1495, in which he described his mystical journey to the Virgin Mary in heaven. At the celestial throne Savonarola presents the Holy Mother a crown made by the Florentine people and presses her to reveal their future. Mary warns that the way will be hard both for the city and for him, but she assures him that God will fulfil his promises: Florence will be "more glorious, more powerful and richer than ever, extending its wings farther than anyone can imagine". She and her heavenly minions will protect the city against its enemies and support its alliance with the French. In the New Jerusalem that is Florence peace and unity will reign. Based on such visions, Savonarola promoted theocracy, and declared Christ the king of Florence. He saw sacred art as a tool to promote this worldview, and he was therefore only opposed to secular art, which he saw as worthless and potentially damaging.

Buoyed by liberation and prophetic promise, the Florentines embraced Savonarola's campaign to rid the city of vice. At his repeated insistence, new laws were passed against sodomy (which included male and female same-sex relations), adultery, public drunkenness, and other moral transgressions, while his lieutenant Fra Silvestro Maruffi organised boys and young men to patrol the streets to curb immodest dress and behaviour. In a sermon held during the winter of 1494, Savonarola said:

It is necessary that the Signory pass laws against the accursed vice of sodomy, for which you know that Florence is infamous throughout the whole of Italy; this infamy arises perhaps from your talking and chattering about it so much, so that there is not so much in deeds, perhaps, as in words. Pass a law, I say, and let it be without mercy; that is, let these people be stoned and burned. On the other hand, it is necessary that you remove from among yourselves these poems and games and taverns and the evil fashion of women's clothes, and, likewise, we must throw out everything that is noxious to the health of the soul. Let everyone live for God and not for the world.

For a time, Pope Alexander VI (1492–1503) tolerated friar Girolamo's strictures against the Church, but he was moved to anger when Florence declined to join his new Holy League against the French invader, and blamed it on Savonarola's pernicious influence. An exchange of letters between the pope and the friar ended in an impasse which Savonarola tried to break by sending the pope "a little book" recounting his prophetic career and describing some of his more dramatic visions. This was the Compendium of Revelations, a self-dramatisation which was one of the farthest-reaching and most popular of his writings.

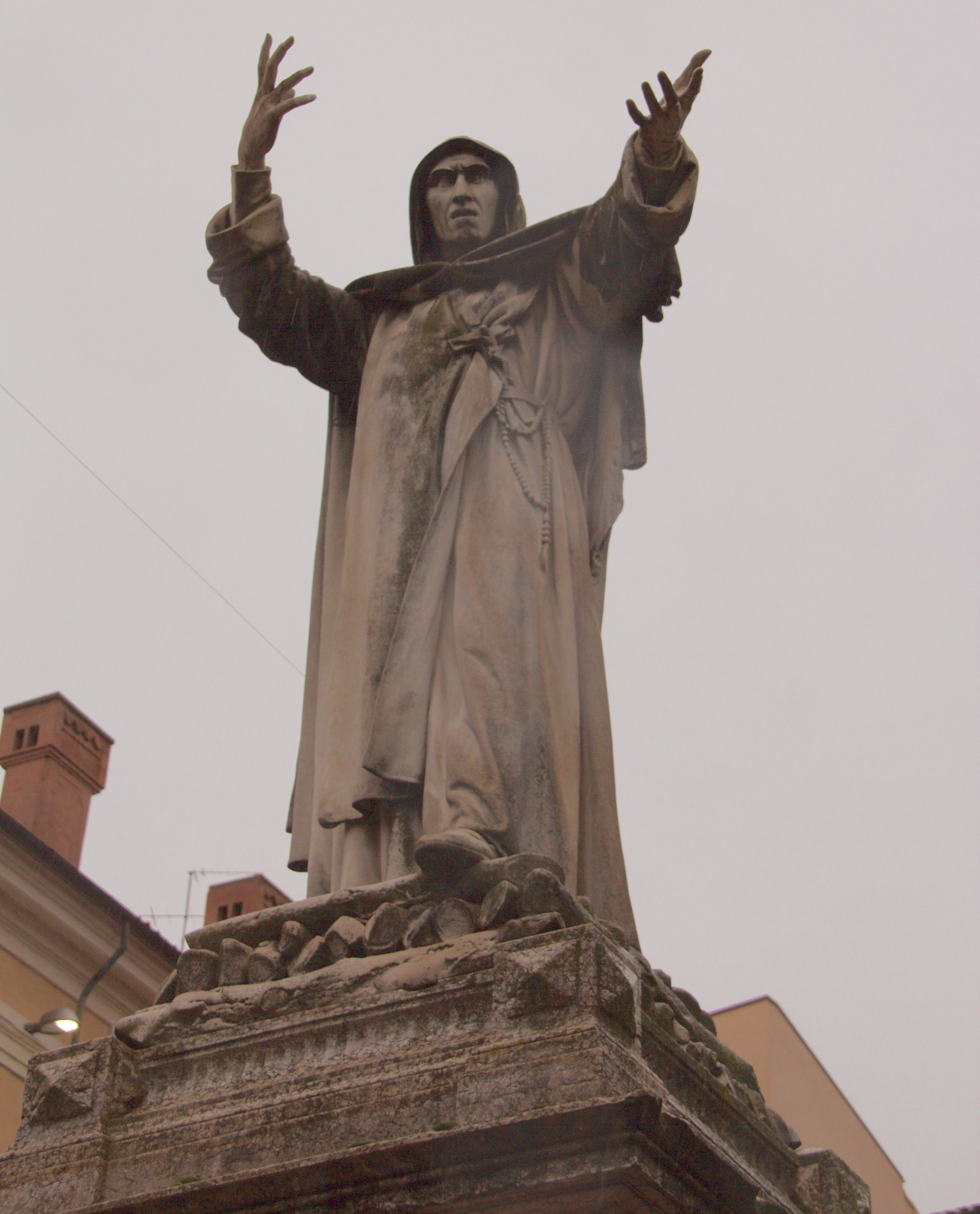
Monument of Savonarola

The pope was not mollified. He summoned the friar to appear before him in Rome, and when Savonarola refused, pleading ill health and confessing that he was afraid of being attacked on the journey, Alexander banned him from further preaching. For some months Savonarola obeyed, but when he saw his influence slipping he defied the pope and resumed his sermons, which became more violent in tone. He not only attacked secret enemies at home whom he rightly suspected of being in league with the papal Curia, he condemned the conventional, or "tepid", Christians who were slow to respond to his calls. He dramatised his moral campaign with special Masses for the youth, processions, bonfires of the vanities and religious theatre in San Marco. He and his close friend, the humanist poet Girolamo Benivieni, composed lauds and other devotional songs for the Carnival processions of 1496, 1497 and 1498, replacing the bawdy Carnival songs of the era of Lorenzo de' Medici. These continued to be copied and performed after his death, along with songs composed by Piagnoni in his memory. A number of them have survived.

== Proto-Protestant ==
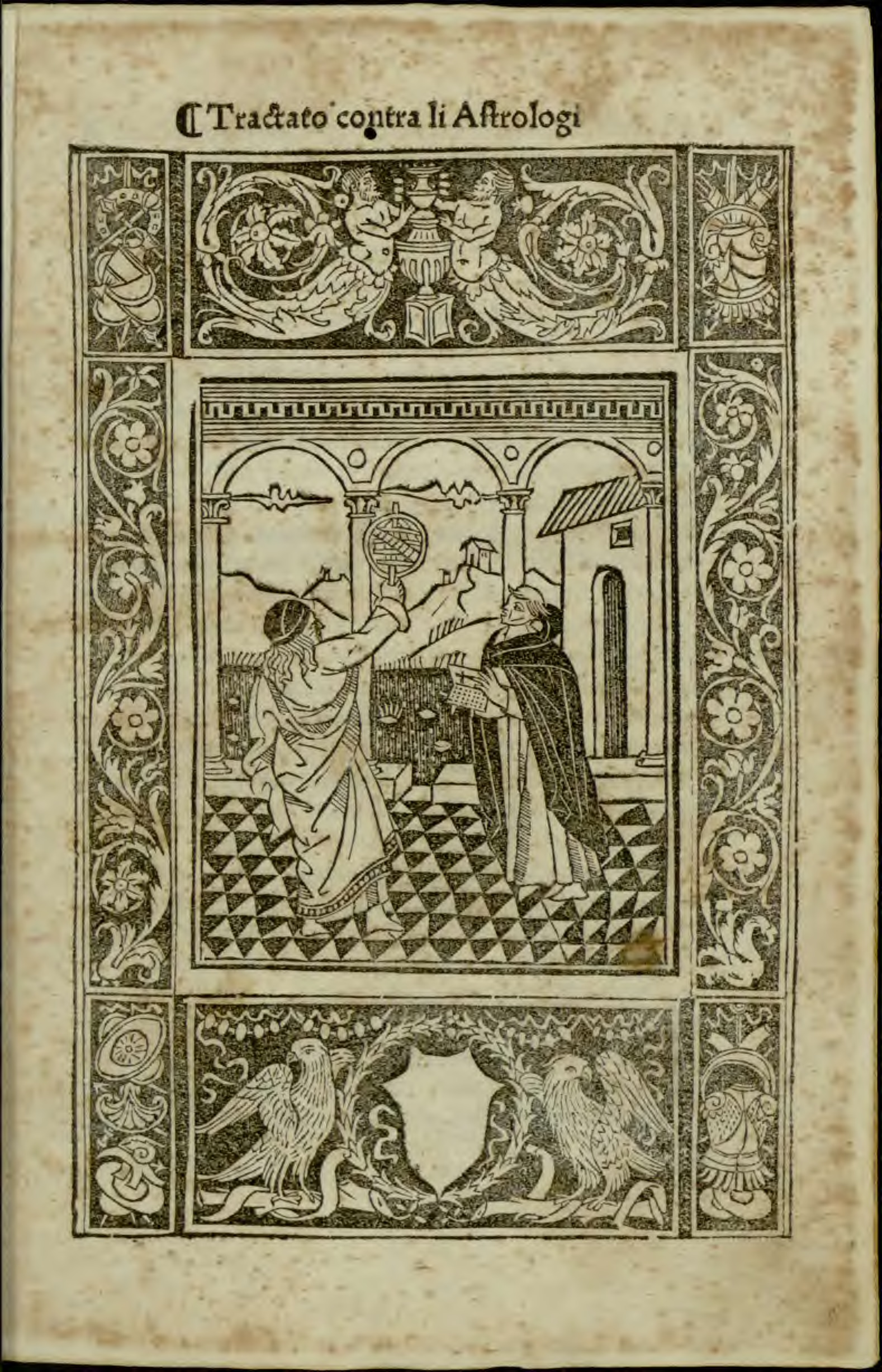
Contra li astrologi, dopo il 1497

The writings of Savonarola spread widely to Germany and Switzerland, and due to Savonarola's life and death, many people started to see the papacy as corrupted and sought a new reform of the church. Many people saw him as a martyr, including Martin Luther, who was influenced by Savonarola's writings. Savonarola's beliefs on the doctrine of justification have been said to be similar in some respects to Martin Luther's teachings, stating that humans are not justified by themselves. Savonarola may have influenced John Calvin, but this is a matter of historical debate.

Savonarola never abandoned the teachings of the Catholic Church; for example, Savonarola held to a belief in seven sacraments and that the Church of Rome is "the mother of all other churches and the pope its head". However, his protests against papal corruption and his reliance on the Bible as the main guide link Savonarola with the later reformation, in the views of some. Savonarola, while revering the office of the papacy, nevertheless criticised the pope Alexander VI and his papal court. Savonarola even prophesied that Rome will come under judgement from God:

the Pope may command me to do something that contravenes the law of Christian love or the Gospel. But, if he did so command, I would say to him, thou art no shepherd. Not the Roman Church, but thou errest Who are the fat kine of Bashan on the mountains of Samaria? I say they are the courtesans of Italy and Rome. Or, are there none? A thousand are too few for Rome, 10,000, 12,000, 14,000 are too few for Rome. Prepare thyself, O Rome, for great will be thy punishments

Savonarola himself emphasized the authority of Scripture, he himself stated: ”I preach the regeneration of the Church, taking the Scriptures as my sole guide.". While not fully formulating the doctrine of sola fide, he in many ways prefigured Luther's theology of justification, writing:

It is untrue that God’s grace is obtained by pre-existing works of merit as though works and deserts were the cause of predestination. On the contrary, these are the result of predestination. Tell me, Peter; tell me, O Magdalene, wherefore are ye in paradise? Confess that not by your own merits have ye obtained salvation, but by the goodness of God — Girolamo Savonarola

Other quotes from Savonarola such as "Not by their own deservings, O Lord, or by their own works have they been saved, lest any man should be able to boast, but because it seemed good in Thy sight." made Martin Luther say that even though the theology of Savonarola wasn't perfect, it was still an example of true Christian theology. Martin Luther later stated about Savonarola:

Christ canonizes Savonarola through us even though popes and papists burst to pieces over it — Martin Luther

Catholic sources, however, criticize the inclusion of Savonarola as a Protestant forerunner, because much of his theology still aligned with Catholic theology. For example, he is credited with writing or popularizing the second half of the modern Hail Mary (Sancta Maria mater Dei...) in his Esposizione sopra l’Ave Maria, (1495). Despite inspiring some Protestant reformers, Savonarola also influenced some leaders of the Counter-Reformation.

== Excommunication and death ==
"The trial of friar Girolamo Savonarola" (Processo di fra Girolamo Savonarola), 1498

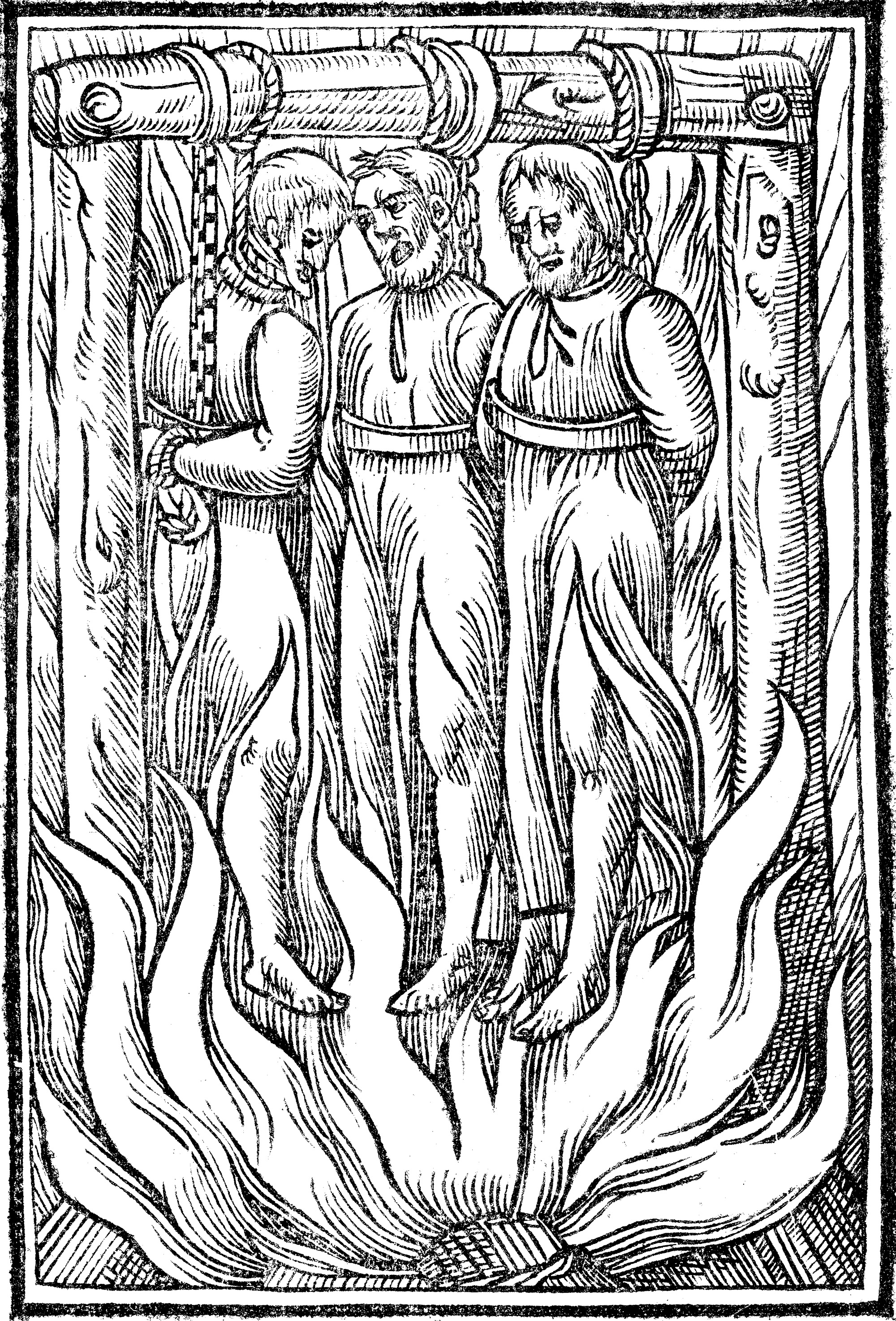
The execution of Fra Girolamo, Fra Domenico, and Fra Silvestro Maruffi

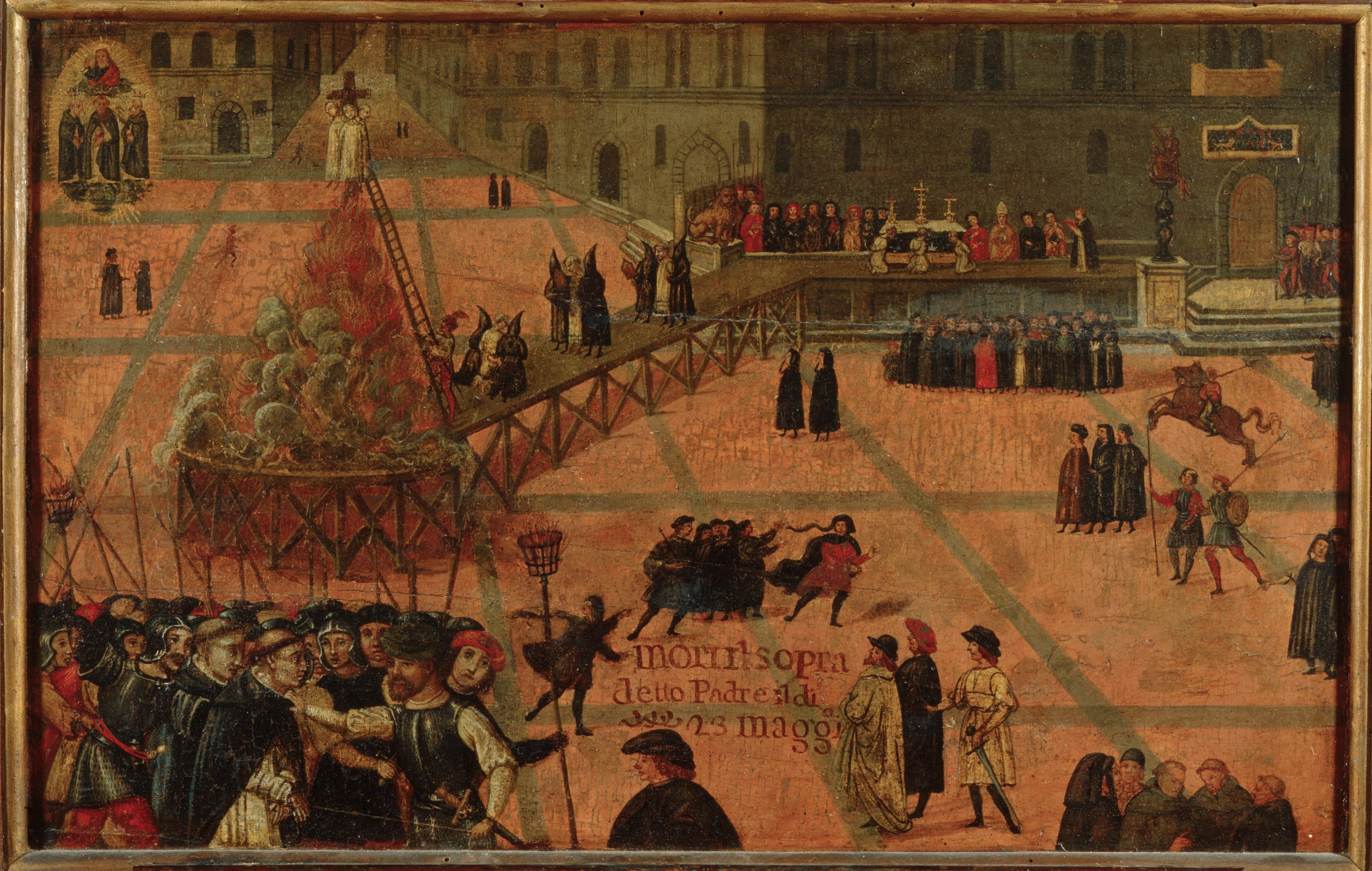
Savonarola's execution in the Piazza della Signoria, painting by Filippo Dolciati (1498)

On 12 May 1497, Borgia Pope Alexander VI excommunicated Savonarola, and also threatened the Florentines with an interdict if they persisted in harbouring him. After describing the contemporary Church leadership as a pockmarked whore sitting on Solomon's throne, Savonarola was excommunicated for heresy and sedition. On 18 March 1498, after much debate and steady pressure from a worried government, Savonarola withdrew from public preaching. Under the stress of excommunication, he composed his spiritual masterpiece, the Triumph of the Cross, a celebration of the victory of the Cross over sin and death and an exploration of what it means to be a Christian. This he summed up in the theological virtue of caritas, or love. In loving their neighbours, Christians return the love which they have received from their Creator and Savior. Savonarola hinted at performing miracles to prove his divine mission, but when a rival Franciscan preacher proposed to test that mission by walking through fire, he lost control of public discourse. Without consulting him, his confidant Fra Domenico da Pescia offered himself as his surrogate and Savonarola felt he could not afford to refuse. The first trial by fire in Florence in over 400 years was set for 7 April.

A crowd filled the central square, eager to see if God would intervene, and if so, on which side. The nervous contestants and their delegations delayed the start of the contest for hours. A sudden rain drenched the spectators and government officials cancelled the proceedings. The crowd disbanded angrily; the burden of proof had been on Savonarola, and he was blamed for the fiasco. A mob assaulted the convent of San Marco. Fra Girolamo, Fra Domenico, and Fra Silvestro Maruffi were arrested and imprisoned. Under torture Savonarola confessed to having invented his prophecies and visions, then recanted, then confessed again. In his prison cell in the tower of the government palace he composed meditations on Psalms 51 (Infelix ego) and 31 (Tristitia obsedit me). On the morning of 23 May 1498, the three friars were led out into the main square where, before a tribunal of high clerics and government officials, they were condemned as heretics and schismatics, and sentenced to die forthwith. Stripped of their Dominican garments in ritual degradation, they mounted the scaffold in their thin white shirts. Each on separate gallows, they were hanged, while fires were ignited below them to consume their bodies. To prevent devotees from searching for relics, their ashes were carted away and scattered in the Arno.

== Aftermath and legacy ==
Resisting censorship and exile, the friars of San Marco fostered a cult of "the three martyrs" and venerated Savonarola as a saint. They encouraged women in local convents and surrounding towns to find mystical inspiration in his example, and, by preserving many of his sermons and writings, they helped keep his political as well as his religious ideas alive.

The return of the Medici in 1512 ended the Savonarola-inspired republic and intensified pressure against the movement, although both were briefly revived in 1527 when the Medici were once again forced out. In 1530, Medici Pope Clement VII (Giulio de' Medici), with the help of soldiers of the Holy Roman Emperor, restored Medici rule, and Florence became a hereditary dukedom. Savonarola's contemporary Niccolò Machiavelli discusses the friar in Chapter VI of his book The Prince, writing:

If Moses, Cyrus, Theseus, and Romulus had been unarmed they could not have enforced their constitutions for long—as happened in our time to Fra Girolamo Savonarola, who was ruined with his new order of things immediately the multitude believed in him no longer, and he had no means of keeping steadfast those who believed or of making the unbelievers to believe.

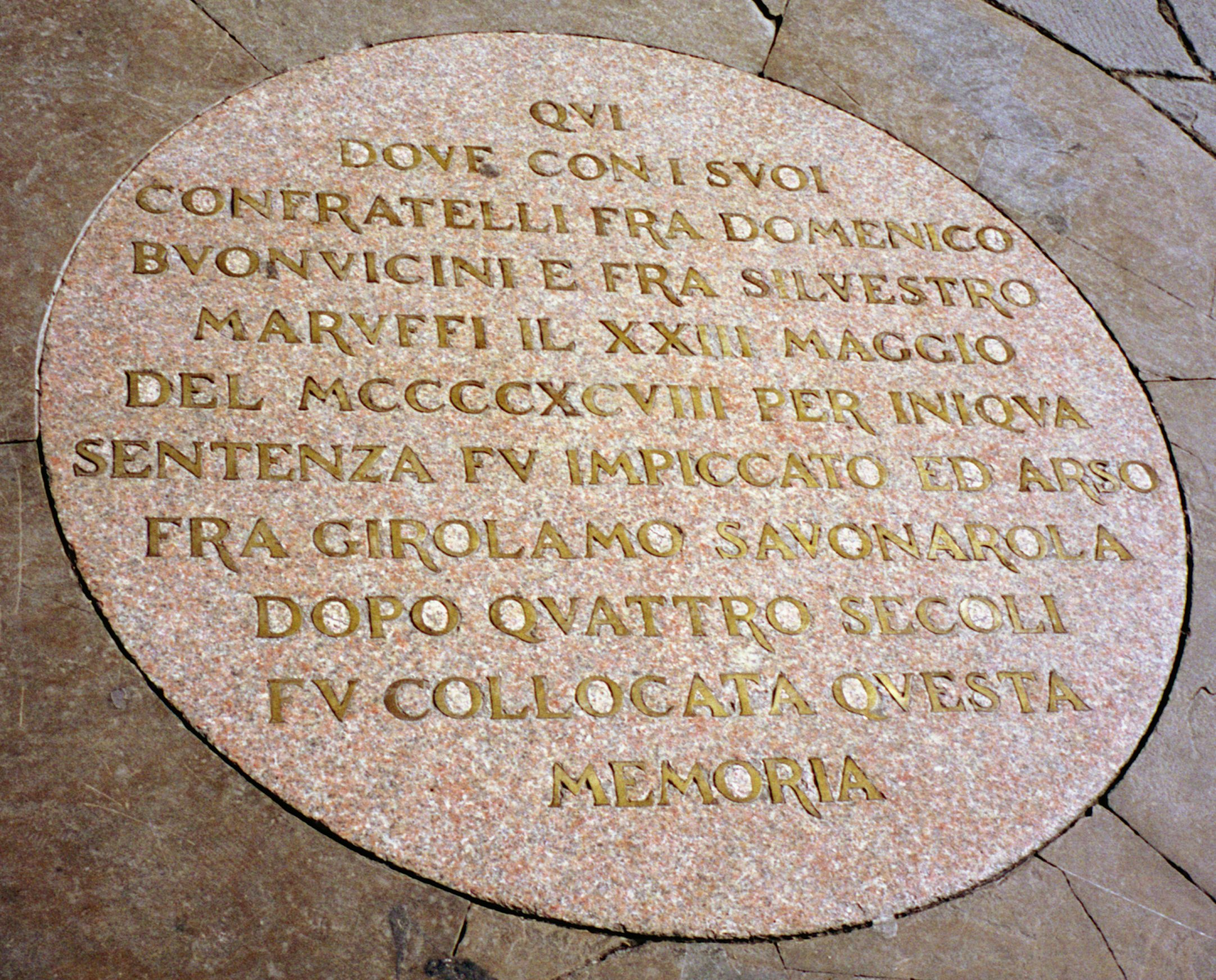
A plaque commemorates the site of Savonarola's execution in the Piazza della Signoria, Florence.

Savonarolan religious ideas found a reception elsewhere. In Germany and Switzerland the early Protestant reformers, most notably Martin Luther himself, read some of the friar's writings and praised him as a martyr and forerunner whose ideas on faith and grace anticipated Luther's own doctrine of justification by faith alone. In France many of his works were translated and published and Savonarola came to be regarded as a precursor of evangelical, or Huguenot reform. In Wittenberg, the hometown of Martin Luther, a statue of Girolamo Savonarola was erected to honour him.

Carafa Pope Paul IV in 1558 declared that Savonarola was not a heretic. Savonarola had remained a believer in the dogmas of the Catholic church and even in his last major work had defended the institution of the papacy. Within the Dominican Order Savonarola was seen as a devotional figure ("the evolving image of a Counter-Reformation saintly prelate"), and in this benevolent guise his memory lived on. Philip Neri, founder of the Oratorians, a Florentine who had been educated by the San Marco Dominicans, also defended Savonarola's memory.

=== 19th century to present ===
In the mid-nineteenth century, the "New Piagnoni" found inspiration in the friar's writings and sermons for the Italian national awakening known as the Risorgimento. By emphasising his political activism over his puritanism and cultural conservatism they restored Savonarola's voice for radical political change. The venerable pre-Reformation icon ceded to the fiery Renaissance reformer. This somewhat anachronistic image, fortified by much new scholarship, informed the major new biography by Pasquale Villari, who regarded Savonarola's preaching against Medici despotism as the model for the Italian struggle for liberty and national unification. In Germany, the Catholic theologian and church historian Joseph Schnitzer edited and published contemporary sources which illuminated Savonarola's career. In 1924 he crowned his vast research with a comprehensive study of Savonarola's life and times in which he presented the friar as the last best hope of the Catholic Church before the catastrophe of the Protestant Reformation. In the Italian People's Party founded by Don Luigi Sturzo in 1919, Savonarola was revered as a champion of social justice, and after 1945 he was held up as a model of reformed Catholicism by leaders of the Christian Democratic Party. From this milieu, in 1952 came the third of the major Savonarola biographies, the Vita di Girolamo Savonarola by Roberto Ridolfi. For the next half century Ridolfi was the guardian of the friar's saintly memory as well as the dean of Savonarola research which he helped grow into a scholarly industry. Today, most of Savonarola's treatises and sermons and many of the contemporary sources (chronicles, diaries, government documents, and literary works) are available in critical editions.

The present-day Church has considered his beatification. In 2020, a devotional society (The Savonarola Society) dedicated to promoting his cause for canonisation was founded; in 2024 this group began The Opera Savonarolae (The Savonarola Project) in collaboration with Studio Fratesco, attempting to translate all of Savonarola's works into English as well as many previously untranslated secondary sources. The first publication in this project was a reprint of Fr. J L O'Neil's 1898 biography Jerome Savonarola: A Sketch. In December 2024, the group received a personal greeting from Pope Francis.

The Polish National Catholic Church, a church not in communion with Rome and a branch of the Union of Scranton, named its seminary after Savonarola.

== Works ==
Almost thirty volumes of Savonarola's sermons and writings have so far been published in the Edizione nazionale delle Opere di Girolamo Savonarola (Rome, Angelo Belardetti, 1953 to the present). For editions of the 15th and 16th centuries see Catalogo delle edizioni di Girolamo Savonarola (secc. xv–xvi) ed. P. Scapecchi (Florence, 1998, ISBN 978-888702722-8).

- Prison Meditations on Psalms 51 and 31 ed. John Patrick Donnelly, S.J. (ISBN 978-0-87462700-8)
- The Compendium of Revelations in Bernard McGinn ed. Apocalyptic Spirituality: Treatises and Letters of Lactantius, Adso of Montier-en-Der, Joachim of Fiore, the Franciscan Spirituals, Savonarola (New York, 1979, ISBN 978-0-80912242-4)
- Savonarola A Guide to Righteous Living and Other Works ed. Konrad Eisenbichler (Toronto, Centre for Reformation and Renaissance Studies, 2003, ISBN 978-0-77272020-7)
- Selected Writings of Girolamo Savonarola Religion and Politics, 1490–1498 ed. Anne Borelli and Maria Pastore Passaro (New Haven, Yale University Press, 2006, ISBN 978-030012904-5)
- Savonarola, Girolamo (1497). Contra gli astrologi (in Italian). Firenze: Bartolomeo de' Libri.
- Savonarola, Girolamo (1536). Contra gli astrologi (in Italian). Venezia: Bernardino Stagnino (1.).
